= Dhanauli (disambiguation) =

Dhanauli may refer to:

- Dhanauli is a census town in Agra district in the state of Uttar Pradesh.
- Dhanauli, Barabanki is a village in Banikoder Block Barabanki district in the state of Uttar Pradesh, India.
- Dhanauli Rampur is a village located in Ghosi tehsil of Mau district, Uttar Pradesh.
