= Bisalpur =

Bisalpur may refer to:

- Bisalpur, Nepal, a village development committee in Baitadi District of western Nepal
- Bisalpur, Pilibhit, a city in Uttar Pradesh, India
  - Bisalpur (Assembly constituency)
- Bisalpur, Rajasthan, a town in the Tonk district of India; located beside the Bisalpur Dam
