= Adhai Din Ka Jhonpra =

Oldest mosque in Rajasthan, India

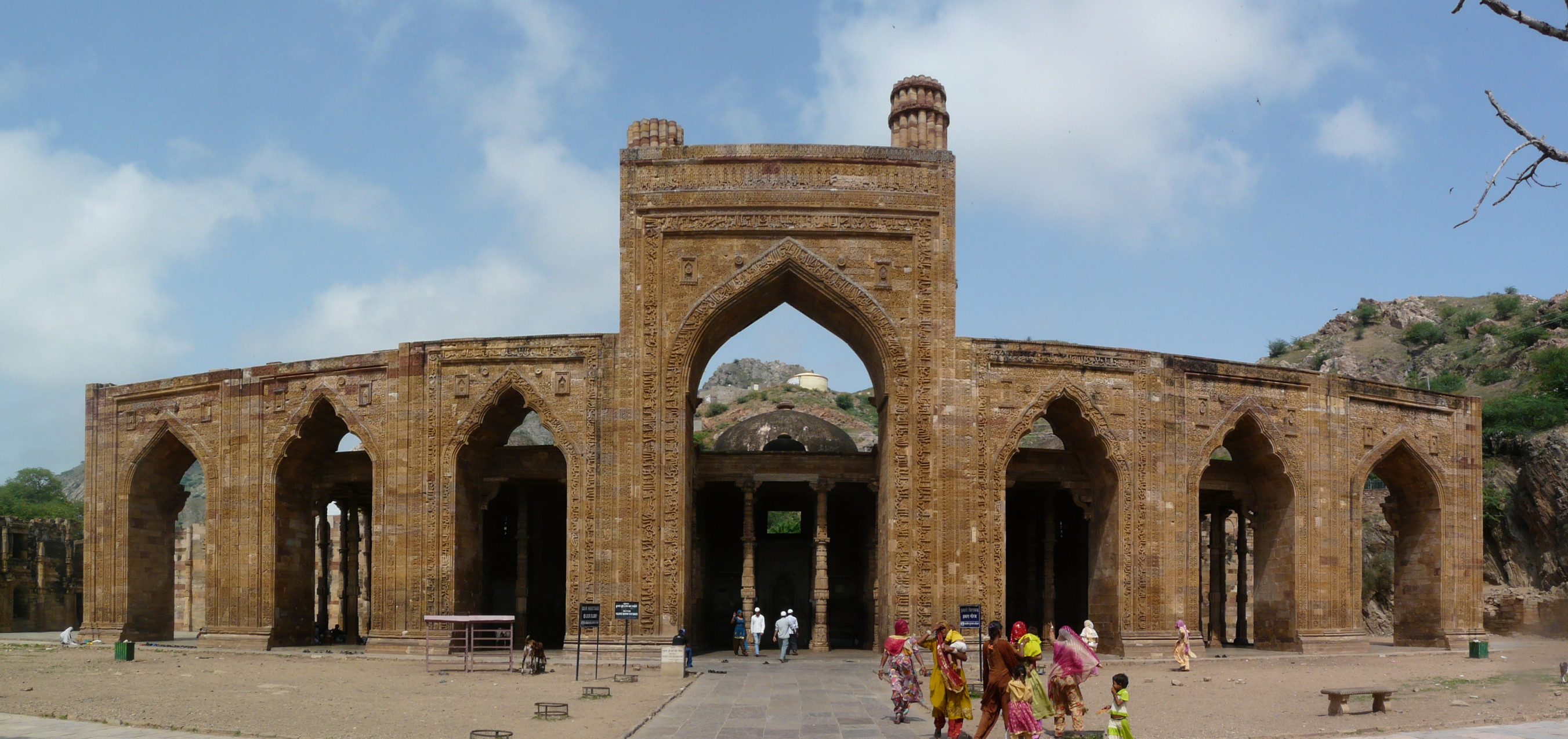
- Screen wall of the former mosque

- Location of the former mosque in Rajasthan

Religion
- Affiliation: Islam (former)
- Ecclesiastical or organisational status: Mosque (12th century–1947)
- Status: Inactive; Preserved

Location
- Location: Andar Kot Rd, Jharneshwar Mandir Road, Ajmer, Rajasthan
- Country: India
- Coordinates: 26°27′18″N 74°37′31″E

Architecture
- Architect: Abu Bakr of Herat
- Style: early Indo-Islamic
- Founder: Qutb ud-Din Aibak
- Groundbreaking: 1192 CE
- Completed: 1199 CE

The Adhai Din Ka Jhonpra (Hindustani for "shed of 2½ days") is a historical former mosque in the city of Ajmer, in Rajasthan, India. It is one of the oldest mosques in India, and the oldest surviving monument in Ajmer.

Commissioned by Qutb-ud-Din-Aibak in 1192 CE and designed by Abu Bakr of Herat, the mosque is an example of early Indo-Islamic architecture. Some of the materials used for the original construction have come from destroyed Hindu and Jain temples. The structure was completed in 1199 CE and was further enhanced by Iltutmish of Delhi in 1213 CE. Most of the building was constructed by Hindu masons under the supervision of Afghan managers.

The mosque retained most of the original Hindu and Jain features, especially on the ornate pillars, with only the effigies of Hindu Gods and Goddesses removed neatly.

The structure was used as a mosque up to 1947. After the independence of India, the structure was turned over to the Jaipur circle of ASI (Archaeological Survey of India) and is today visited by people of all religions, as a fine example of a mix of Indian, Hindu, Islamic and Jain architectures.

== Etymology ==
"Adhai Din Ka Jhonpra" literally means "shed of two-and-a-half days". Alternative transliterations and names include Arhai Din ka Jhompra or Dhai Din ki Masjid. A legend states that a part of the mosque was built in two-and-a-half days (see #Conversion into a mosque below). Some Sufis claim that the name signifies a human's temporary life on the earth.

According to the ASI, the name probably comes from a two-and-a-half-day-long fair that used to be held at the site. Indian academic Har Bilas Sarda points out that the name "Adhai-Din-ka-Jhonpra" is not mentioned in any historical source. Before the 18th century, the mosque was simply known as a "Masjid" ("mosque"), since it had been the only mosque in Ajmer for centuries. It came to be known as a jhonpra ("shed" or "hut") when fakirs started gathering here to celebrate urs (death anniversary fair) of their leader Panjaba Shah. This happened during the Maratha era, in the second half of the 18th century. The urs lasted for two-and-a-half days, resulting in the modern name of the mosque.

Alexander Cunningham described the building as the "Great Mosque of Ajmer".

== History ==
=== Pre-Islamic structure ===
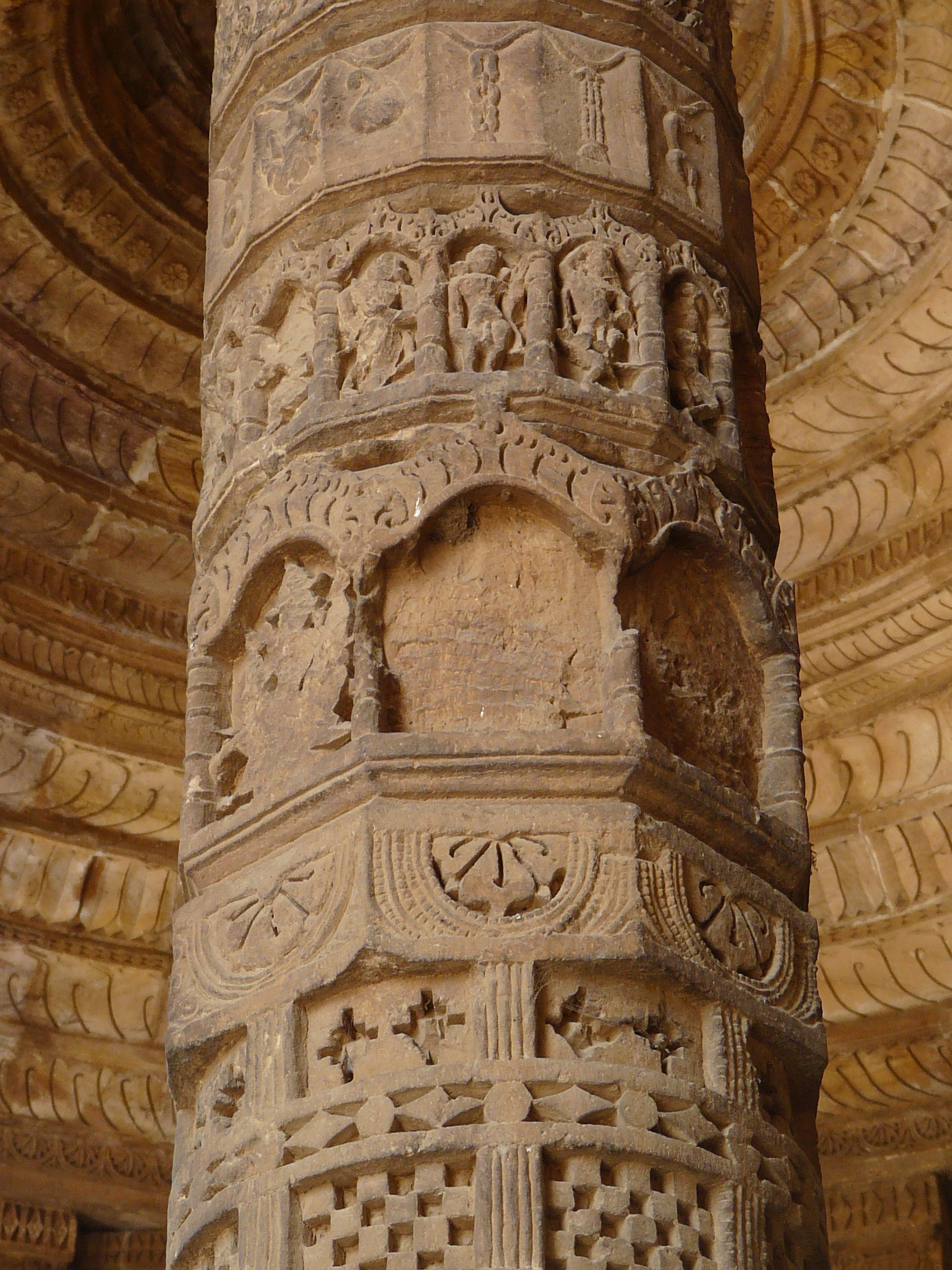
Hindu-Jain-style pillar

The site of the mosque originally had another structure. According to Jain tradition, this structure was constructed by Seth Viramdeva Kala in 660 CE as a Jain shrine to celebrate Panch Kalyanaka. Epigraphic evidence suggests that the site had a Sanskrit college building commissioned by Vigraharaja IV (alias Visaladeva), a king of the Shakambhari Chahamana (Chauhan) dynasty. The original building was square-shaped, with a tower-chhatri (dome-shaped pavilion) at each corner. A temple dedicated to Sarasvati was located on the western side. A tablet dated to 1153 CE was found at the site in the 19th century; based on this, it can be inferred that the original building must have been constructed sometime before 1153 CE.

The relics in the modern building show both Hindu and Jain features. According to KDL Khan, the building materials were taken from Hindu and Jain temples. The interior of the mosque still looks more like a Hindu temple, with the main hall held up by numerous columns. According to Caterina Mercone Maxwell and Marijke Rijsberman, the Sanskrit college was a Jain institution, and the building materials were taken from Hindu temples. ASI Director-General Alexander Cunningham hypothesized that the pillars used in the building were probably taken from 20–30 demolished Hindu temples, which featured at least 700 pillars in total. Based on the pillar inscriptions, he concluded that these original temples dated to 11th or 12th century CE. Cunningham also mentions that according to James Tod, who had earlier visited the mosque, the whole building could have been originally a Jain Temple.

=== Conversion into a mosque ===
The original building was partially destroyed and converted into a mosque by Qutb-ud-Din-Aibak of Delhi in the late 12th century. According to a local legend, after defeating Vigraharaja's nephew Prithviraja III in the Second Battle of Tarain, Muhammad of Ghor passed through Ajmer. There, he saw the magnificent temples, and ordered his slave general Qutb-ud-Din-Aibak to destroy them, and construct a mosque – all within 60 hours (that is, 2 1/2 days). The artisans could not build a complete mosque in 60 hours time, but constructed a brick screen wall where Ghori could offer prayers. By the end of the century, a complete mosque was built.

The mosque was the second mosque to be built by the Mamluks of Delhi (the first being the Quwwat-ul-Islam mosque). The central mihrab in the mosque contains an inscription indicating the completion date of the mosque. It is dated Jumada II 595 AH (April 1199 CE). Another inscription, dated Dhu al-Hijjah 596 AH (September–October 1200 CE), names Abu Bakr ibn Ahmed Khalu Al-Hirawi as the supervisor of construction. This makes Adhai Din Ka Jhonpra one of the oldest mosques in India, and the oldest surviving monument in Ajmer.

Iltutmish, the successor of Qutb-ud-Din-Aibak, subsequently beautified the mosque in 1213 CE, with a screen wall pierced by corbelled engrailed arches — a first in India. An inscription on the central arch of the screen as well as two inscriptions of the northern minaret contain his name. The second arch from the south names one Ahmed ibn Muhammad al-Arid as the construction supervisor.

=== Archaeological survey and restoration ===
The mosque seems to have been ignored by the later kings. It does not find a mention in Taj-ul-Maasir, the earliest history of the Mamluk dynasty. It is not mentioned in Khalji, Tughlaq Lodi and Mughal chronicles either. The Maratha leader Daulat Rao Sindhia (1779–1827) restored the central dome of the building and imposed a ban on the removal of stones from the structure. An inscription dated Saavan 1866 VS (1809 CE) exhorts Hindus and Muslims not to remove stones from the ancient building.

In 1818, Ajmer came under the Company rule. James Tod visited the mosque in 1819, and described it in his Annals and Antiquities of Rajasthan as "one of the most perfect as well as the most ancient monuments of Hindu architecture." Subsequently, Alexander Cunningham, the Director-General of the Archaeological Survey of India (ASI) inspected the building in 1864, and described it in the ASI report of that year. Tod believed the earlier structure to be a Jain temple. However, Cunningham pointed out that this could not be correct, since the pillars in the building feature several four-armed figures (characteristic of Hindu gods) besides a figure of the Hindu goddess Kali.

During an 1875–76 archaeological survey, inscriptions referring to a Sanskrit college were unearthed in the mosque premises. Several sculptures and 6 Devanagari basalt tablets (slabs) were recovered from the site. These artifacts are now exhibited at the Ajmer Museum. The tablets are as follows:

- Tablets 1 and 2 contain large fragments of a Sanskrit play Lalita-Vigraharaja Nataka. It was composed by Mahakavi Somadeva, in honour of the king Vigraharaja. The play, as restored by Lorenz Franz Kielhorn from the fragments, depicts the story of king Vigraharaja. It tells of his love for princess Desaldevi, and his war preparations against a Turushka (Turkic) king named Hammir.
- Tablet 3 and 4 contain fragments of Harakeli Nataka, a play attributed to Vigraharaja himself. The play is written in honour of the god Hara (Shiva). It is inspired by Bharavi's Sanskrit play Kiratarjuniya. The play is dated to 22 November 1153 in an inscription.
- Tablet 5 contains portions of an untitled Sanskrit poem, which praises several devas (deities). The last deity mentioned in the poem is Surya (the sun god). The poem states that the Chahamana (Chauhan) dynasty descends from Surya (see Suryavanshi).
- Tablet 6 contains the fragments of a prashasti (praise) of the Chahamana kings of Ajmer. The inscription states that the king Ajaideva moved his residence to Ajmer, and defeated the king Naravarma of Malwa. After handing over the throne to his son, he took up Vanaprastha (retirement) in the forest of Pushkar. His son adorned Ajmer with the blood of the Turushkas (Turkic people) and captured the elephants of the kings of Malwa. The inscription also mentions the name "Kumar Pal", but nothing can be made out of this name because of missing portions.

The tablets containing the plays were engraved by Bhaskar, son of Mahipati and grandson of Govinda, hailing from a family of Huna chiefs.

Another Devanagari inscription is located on a marble pillar in the balcony of an entrance gate. It records the visit of Dharma, a mason of Bundi in the Jyeshtha 1462 VS (1405 CE), during the reign of Rana Mokal.

During the tenure of Viceroy Lord Mayo, between 1875 and 1878 CE, repairs to the structure were carried out at a cost of ₹ 23,128. Another restoration, costing ₹ 7,538 was carried out in 1900–1903, under the supervision of Ajmer-Merwara commissioner ALP Tucker. ASI archaeologists Alexander Cunningham and D. R. Bhandarkar carried out a restoration of the building in the first half of the 20th century. Cunningham remarked that no other building of historical or archaeological importance in India was more worthy of preservation.

== Architecture ==
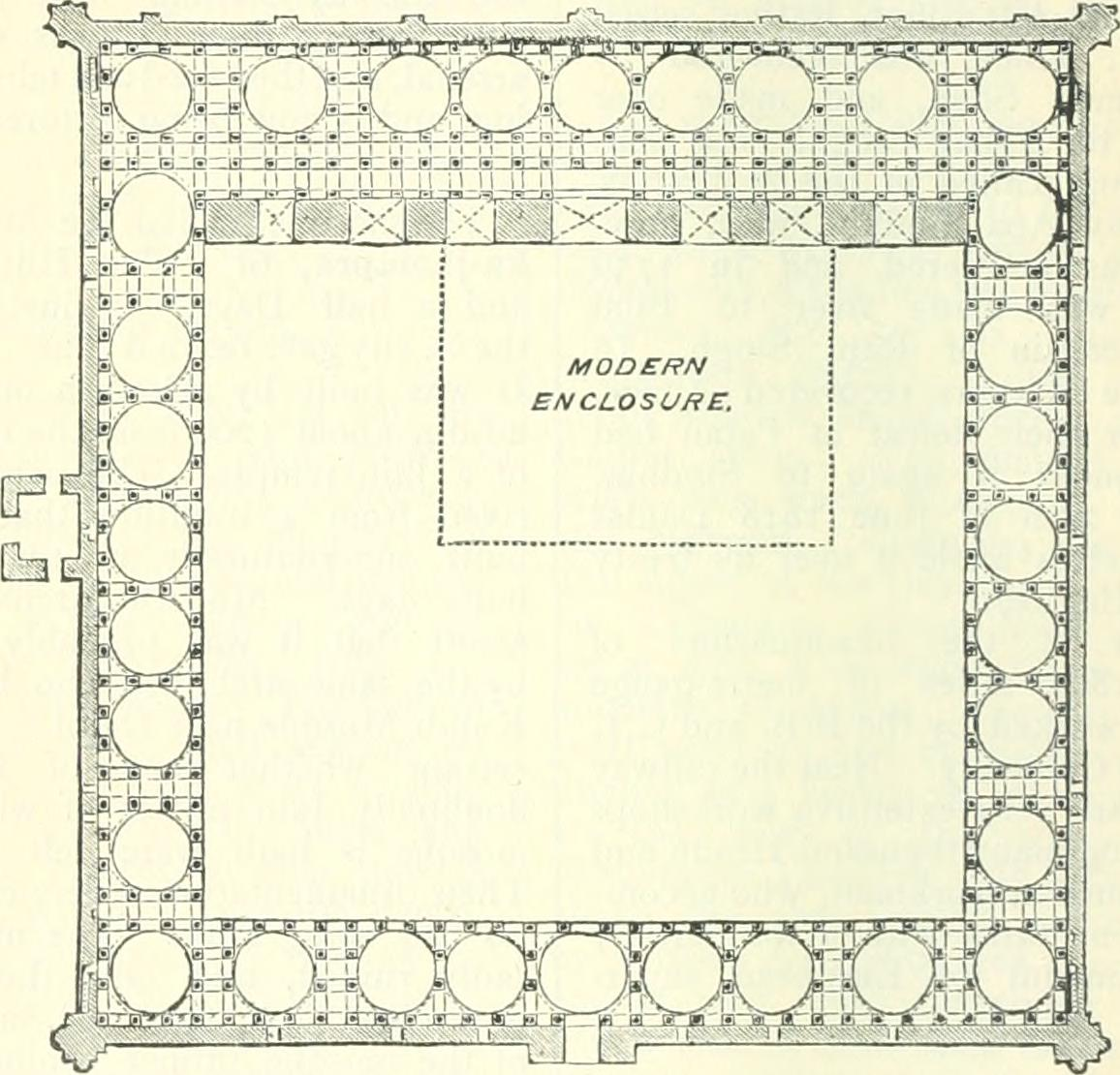
Plan of the building

The mosque is among the earliest examples of the Indo-Islamic architecture. It was designed by Abu Bakr of Herat, an architect who accompanied by Muhammad Ghori. The mosque was built almost entirely by Hindu masons, under the supervision of Afghan managers.

The mosque is much larger than the Quwwat-ul-Islam mosque of Delhi. The exterior of the building is square-shaped, with each side measuring 79 metres (259 ft). There are two entrances, one at the south, and another at the east. The prayer area (the actual mosque) is located in the west, while the north side faces a hill rock. The actual mosque building on the western side has 10 domes and 124 pillars; there are 92 pillars on the eastern side; and 64 pillars on each of the remaining sides. Thus, there are 344 pillars in the entire building. Out of these, only 70 pillars remain standing now. It has a square dimension measuring 80 m (260 ft). The tall and slender pillars are not overcrowded and the ones in the courtyard are symmetrically placed. The sanctuary measures 43 m (141 ft) by 12 m (39 ft). The mihrab is built with white marbles. It is believed that Iltumish added the seven arch screens by 1230, which is considered to be an architecturally most notable feature of the mosque. The large central arch is accompanied by two small fluted minarets.

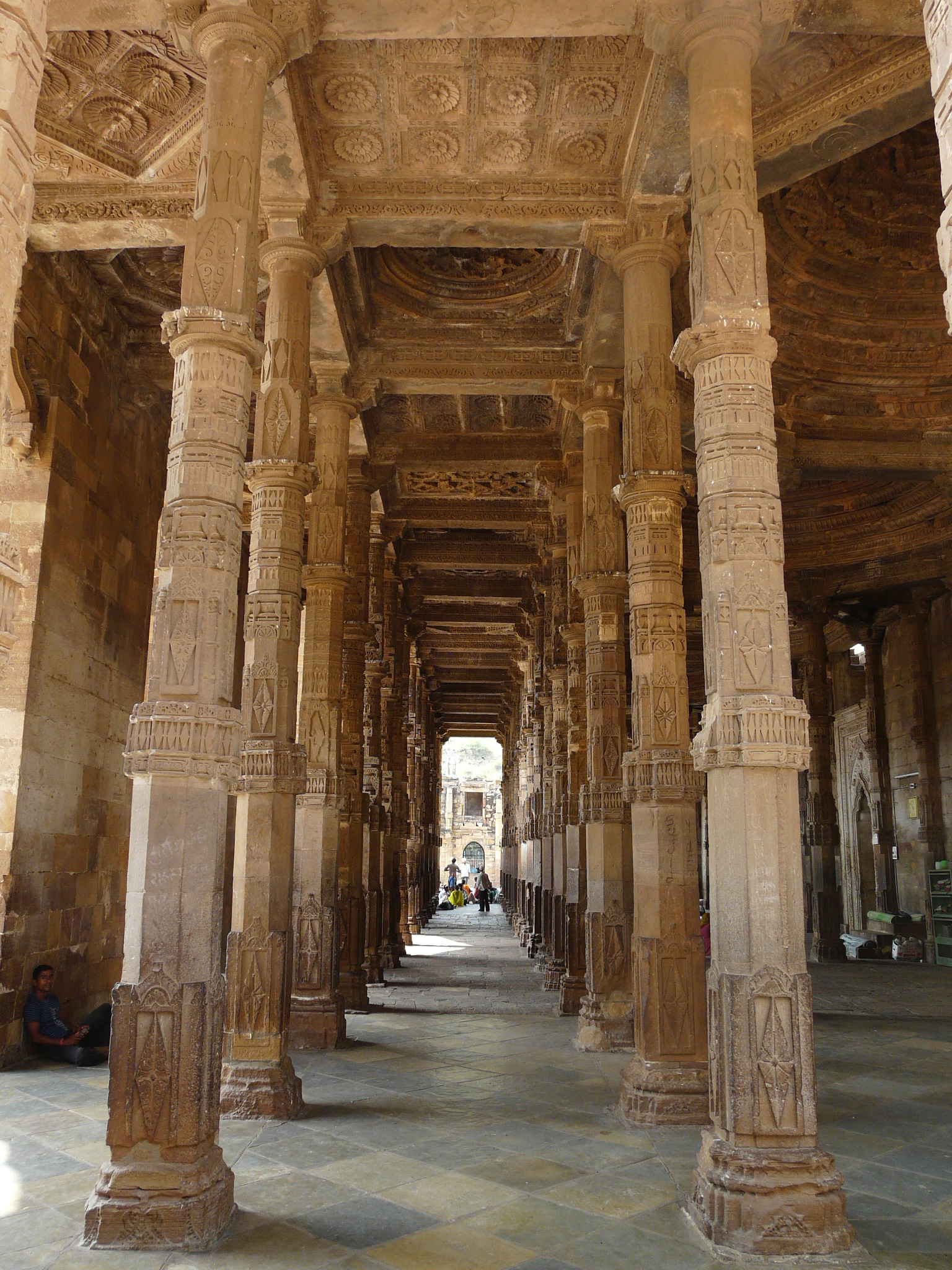
Arcade pillars

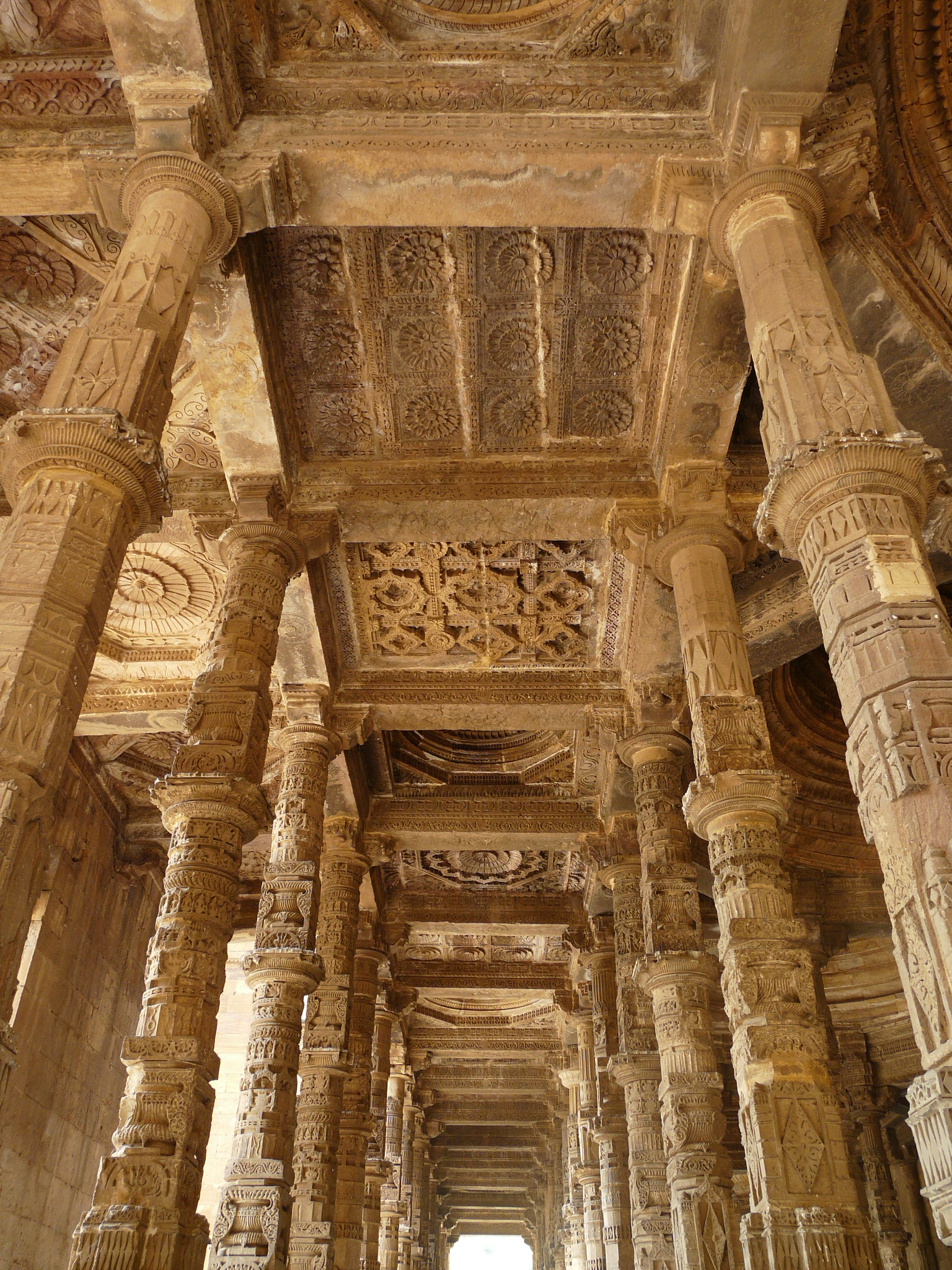
Arcade ceiling

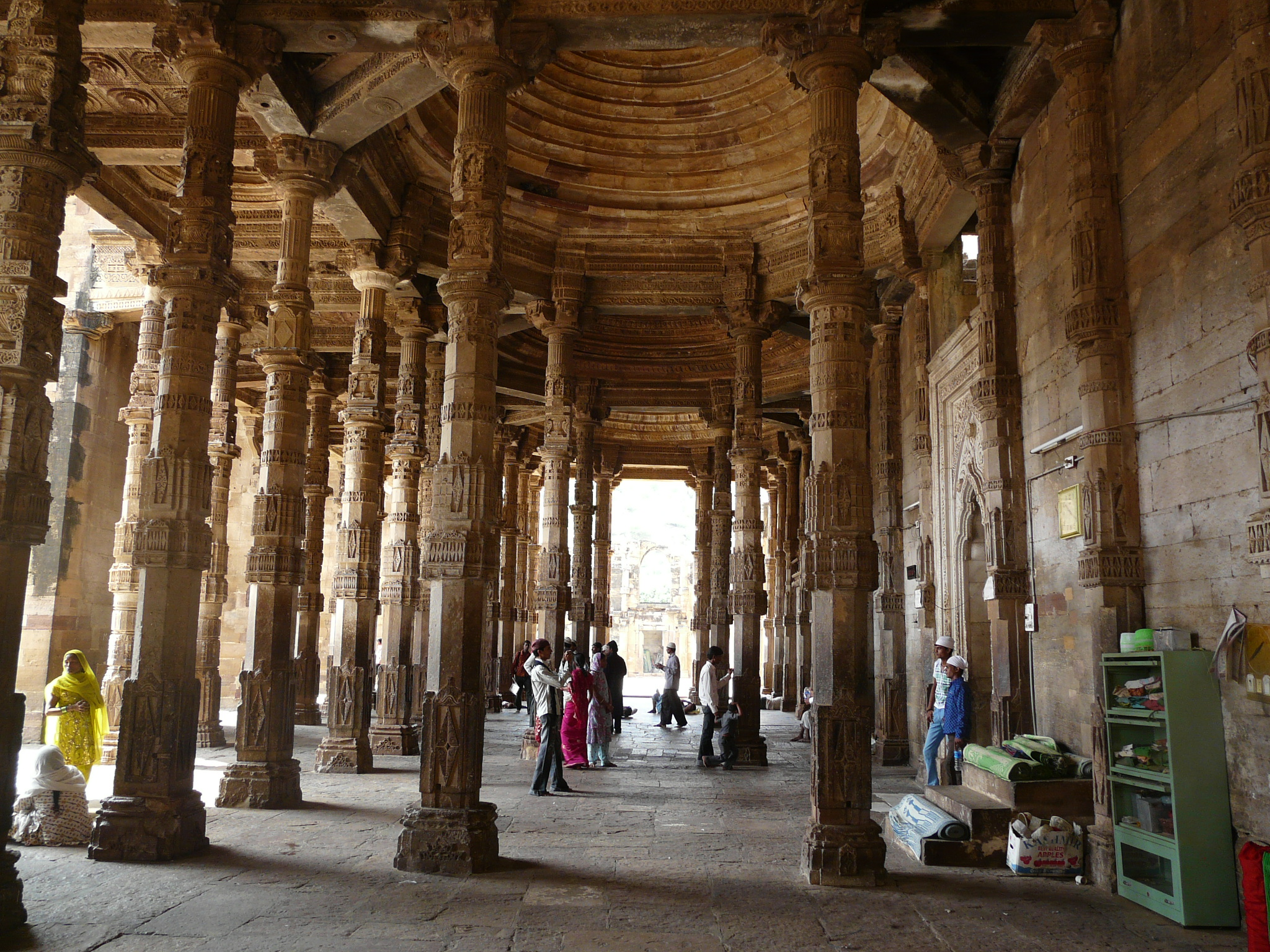
Mihrab arcade

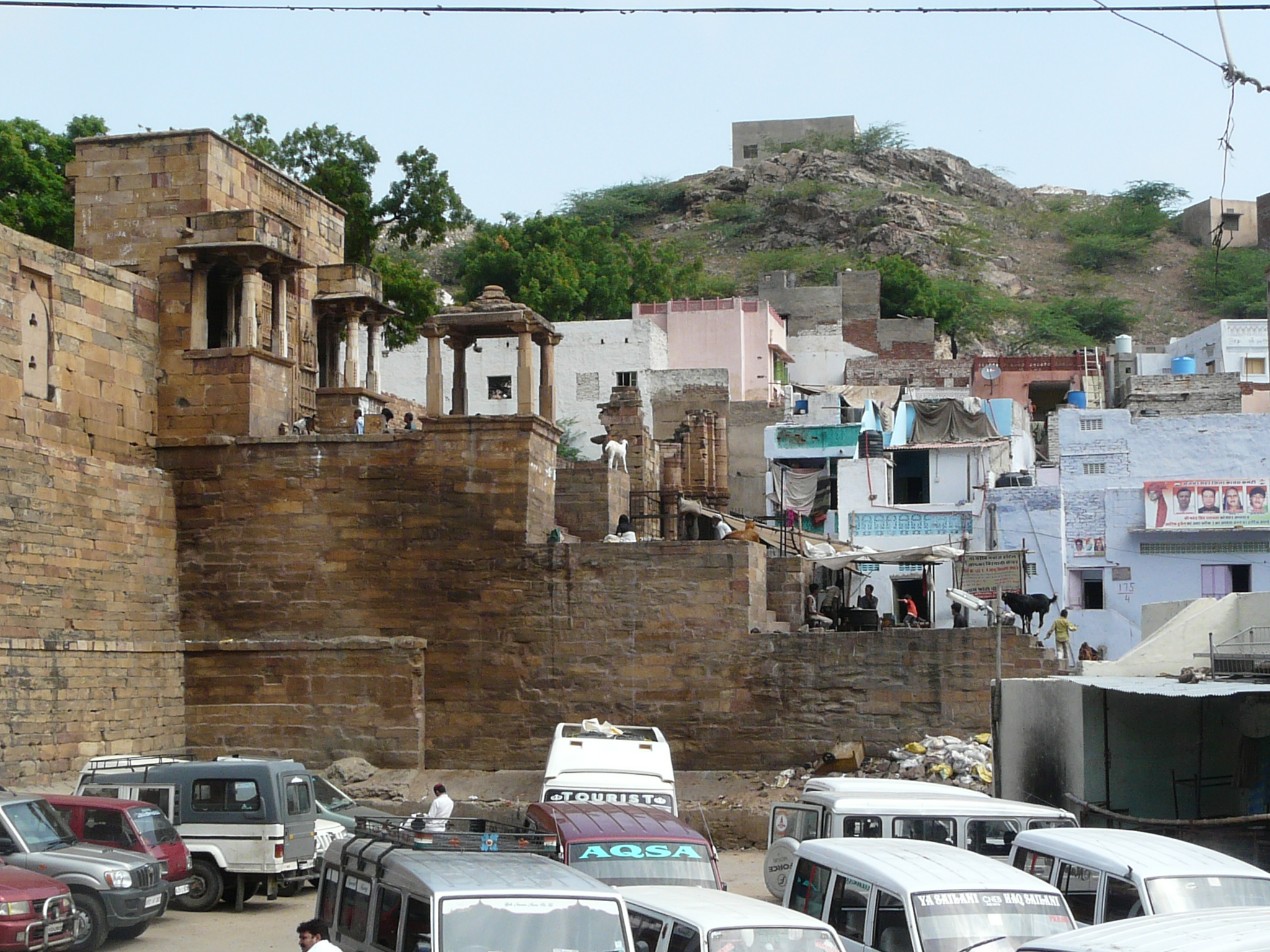
Entrance staircase

The front facade of the structure features a huge screen with yellow limestone arches, built during the reign of Iltutmish. The main arch is nearly 18 metres (60 ft) high and is flanked by six smaller arches. The arches have small rectangular panels for passage of daylight, similar to the ones found in early Arabian mosques. The archway features Kufic and Tughra inscriptions and quotations from the Koran, and is reminiscent of Islamic architecture from Ghazni and Turkistan. Some of the carvings feature Arabesque floral and foliate patterns; their geometric symmetry is reminiscent of Persian tilework. Their filigree sets them apart from Hindu-style carvings in the same building. The Hindu patterns are similar to the ones seen in the 10th-century structures at Nagda and the 11th century Sas-Bahu Temple at Gwalior. The 19th century American traveler John Fletcher Hurst described the screen as "a gem of great renown throughout the Mohammedan world."

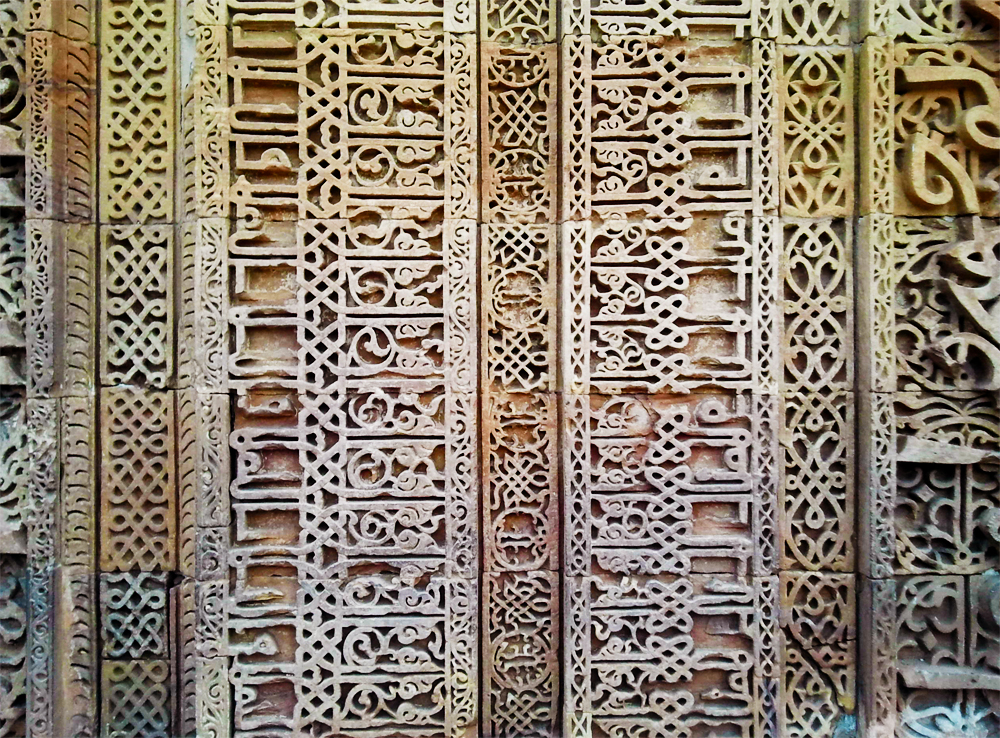
Ornate carvings and Kufic inscriptions

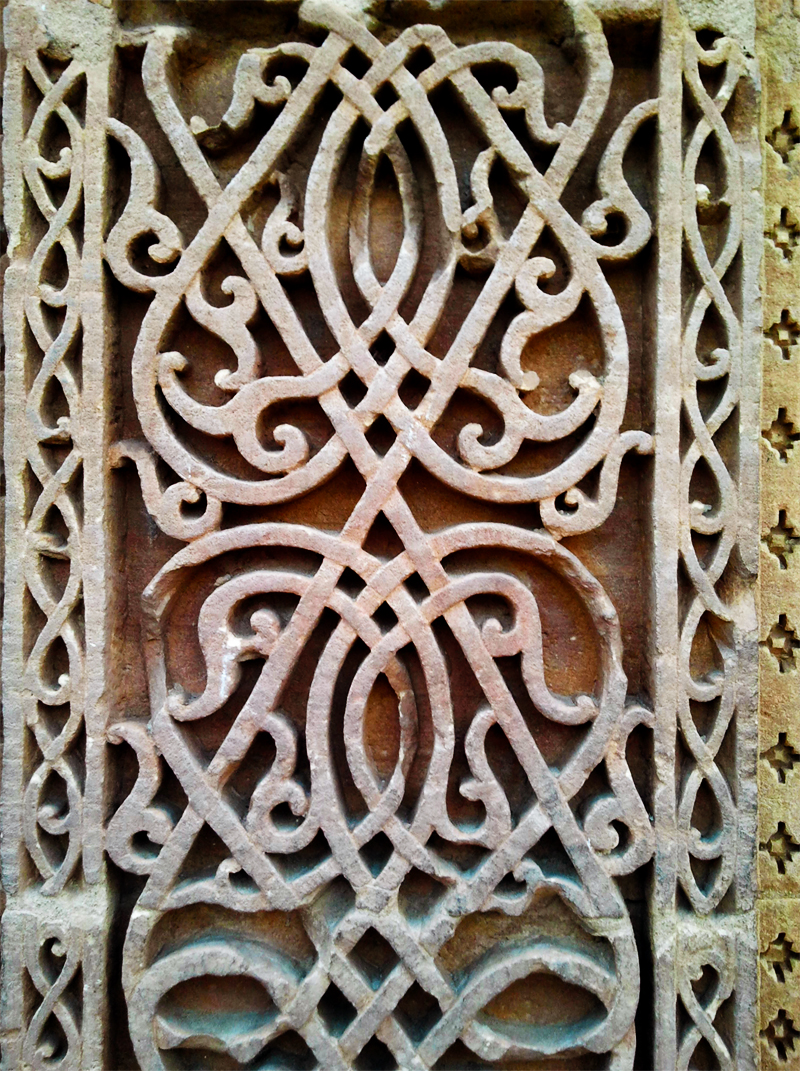
Floral motif

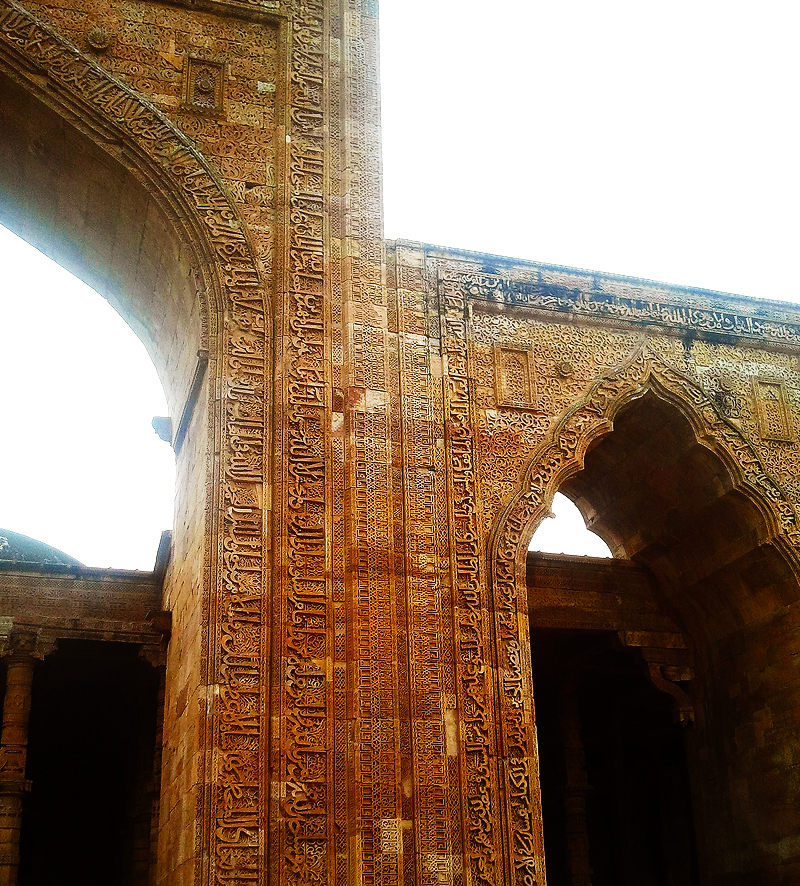
Arches with inscriptions from Koran

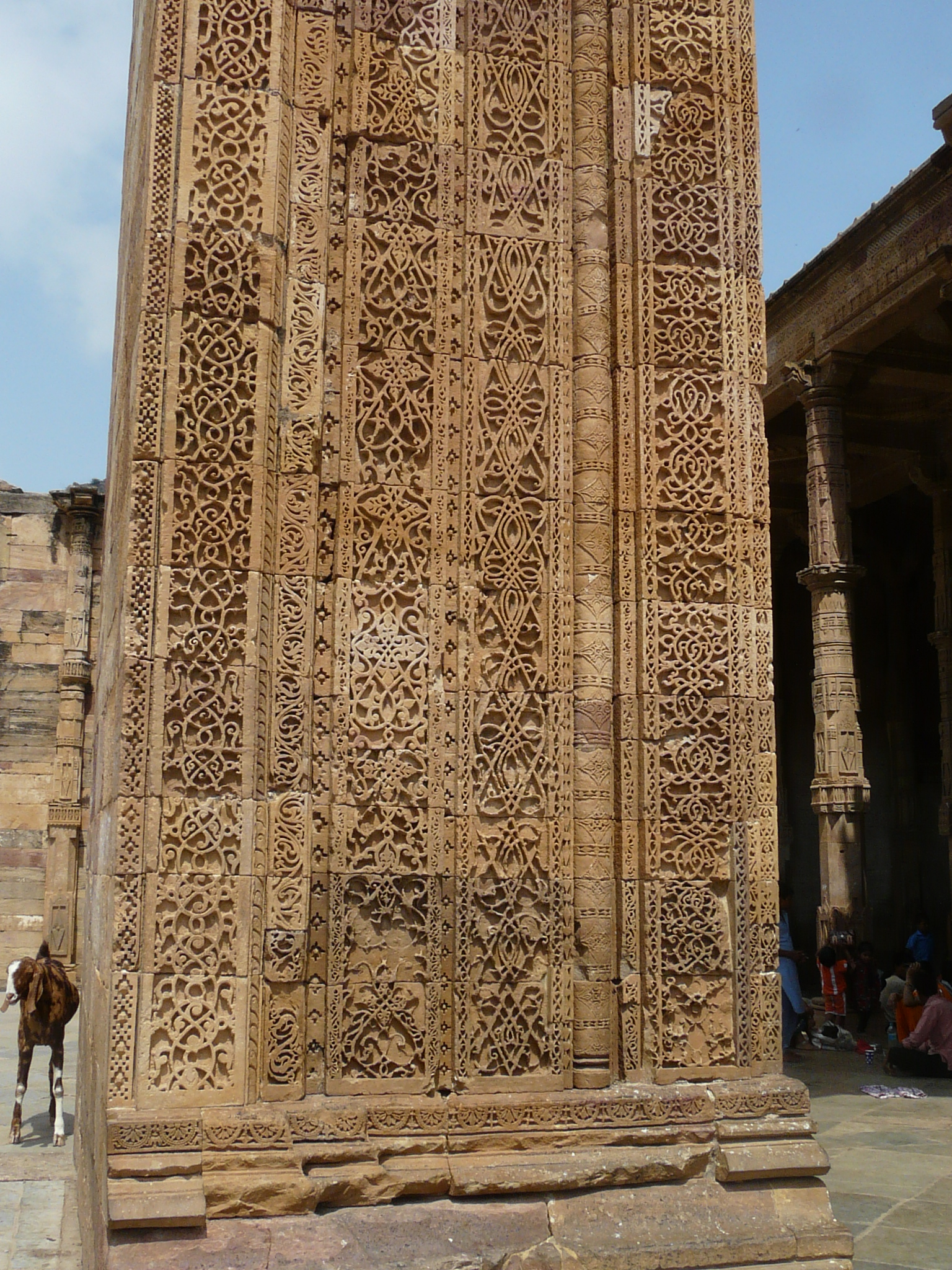
Decorative screen wall

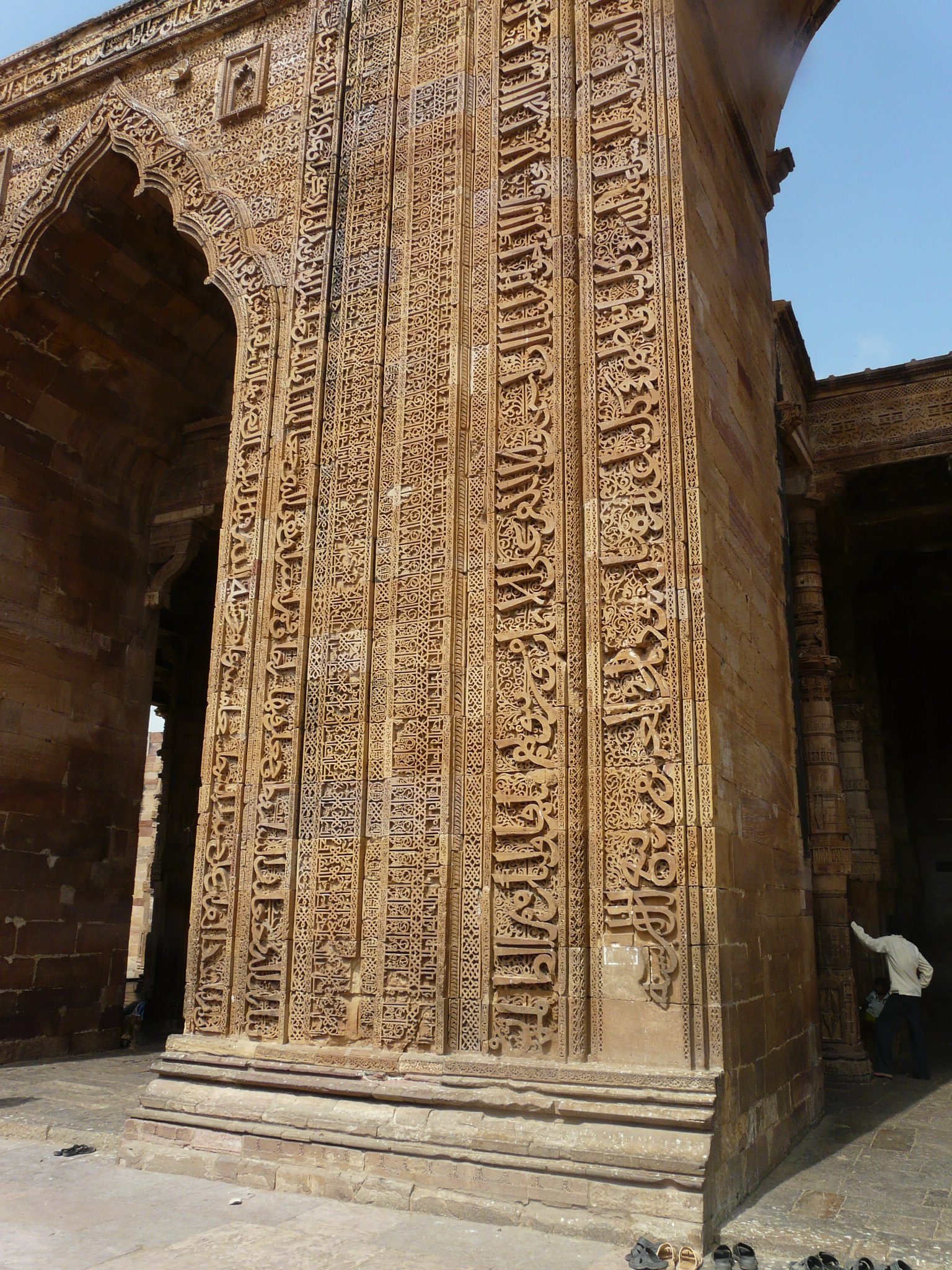
Inscriptions on the screen wall

The interior of the building is a quadrangle measuring 61 by 53 metres (200 ft × 175 ft). It comprises the main hall (76 by 12 metres (248 ft × 40 ft)) supported by cloisters of pillars. The pillars feature varying designs and are heavily decorated, similar to the ones in Hindu and Jain rock temples. They have large bases and taper as they rise in height. According to K.D.L. Khan, the pillars and roofs are from the pre-Islamic structure, but the original carvings were destroyed by Muslims. Michael W. Meister believes that some of the pillars were newly created by Hindu masons for their Muslim masters; these were combined with the older, plundered pillars (whose images were defaced). Similarly, he states that the ceilings combine newer and older work by Hindu workers.

The muazzin's towers are located in two small minarets (5.9 metres (19.5 ft) in diameter). These minarets are located at the top of an 3.5 metres (11.5 ft) thick screen wall. The minarets are now ruined, but their remnants show that they were sloping hollow towers with 24 alternately angular and circular flutes, just like the ones in the Qutb Minar of Delhi.

Alexander Cunningham praised the architecture of Adhai Din Ka Jhonpra and Quwwat-ul-Islam mosques in the following words:

In boldness of design, and grandeur of conception, which are perhaps due to the genius of the Islamite architect, these two splendid mosques of the first Indian Muhammadans are only surpassed by the soaring sublimity of the Christian Cathedrals. But in the gorgeous prodigality of ornament, in the beautiful richness of tracery, and an endless variety of detail, in delicate sharpness of finish, and the laborious accuracy of workmanship, all of which are due to the Hindu masons, I think that these two grand Indian mosques may justly vie with the noblest buildings which the world has yet produced.

Scottish architectural historian James Fergusson similarly remarked:

As examples of surface-decoration, these two mosques of Altumush at Delhi and Ajmir are probably unrivaled. Nothing in Cairo or in Persia is so exquisite in detail, and nothing in Spain or Syria can approach them for the beauty of surface decoration.

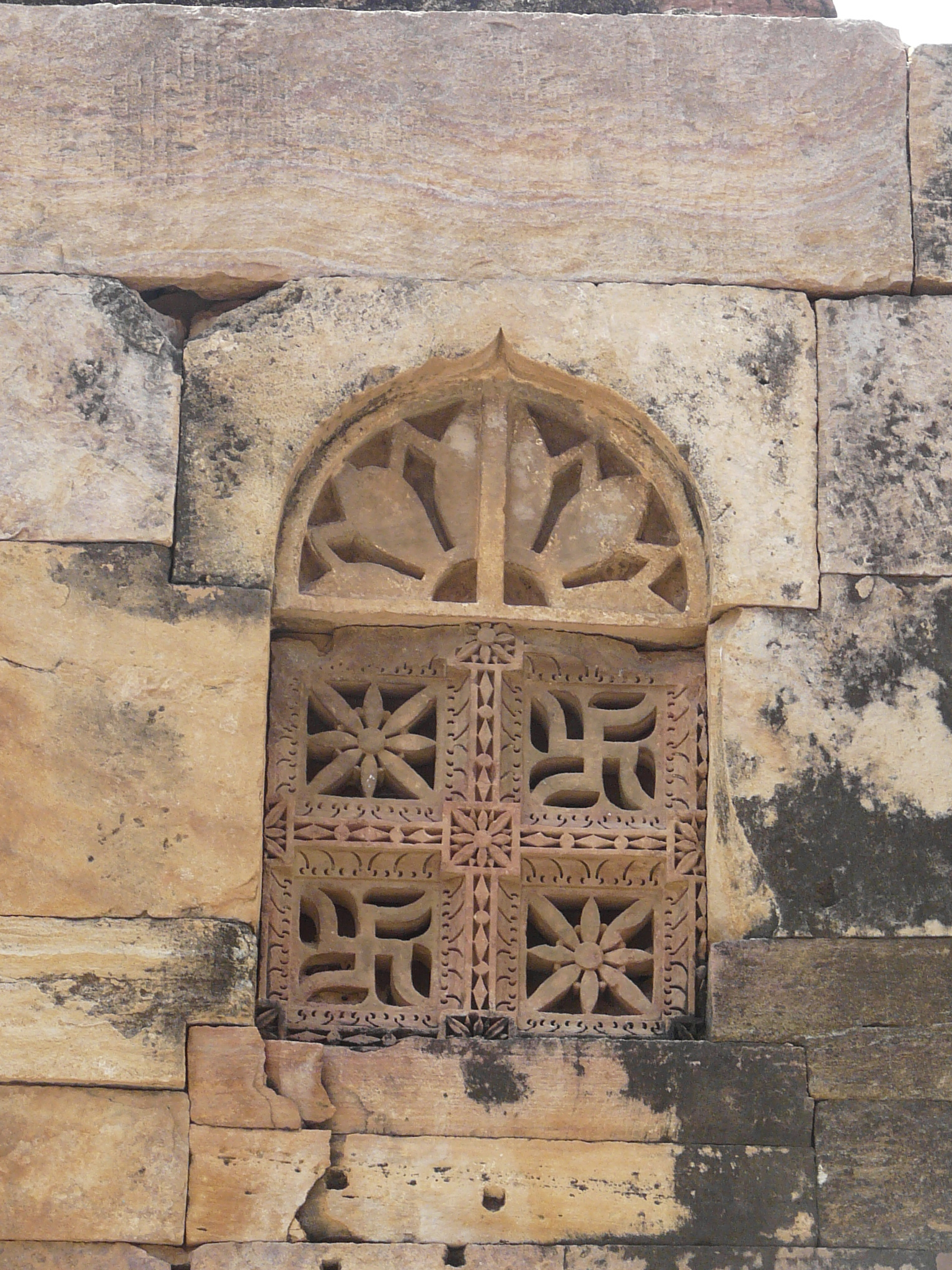
Window

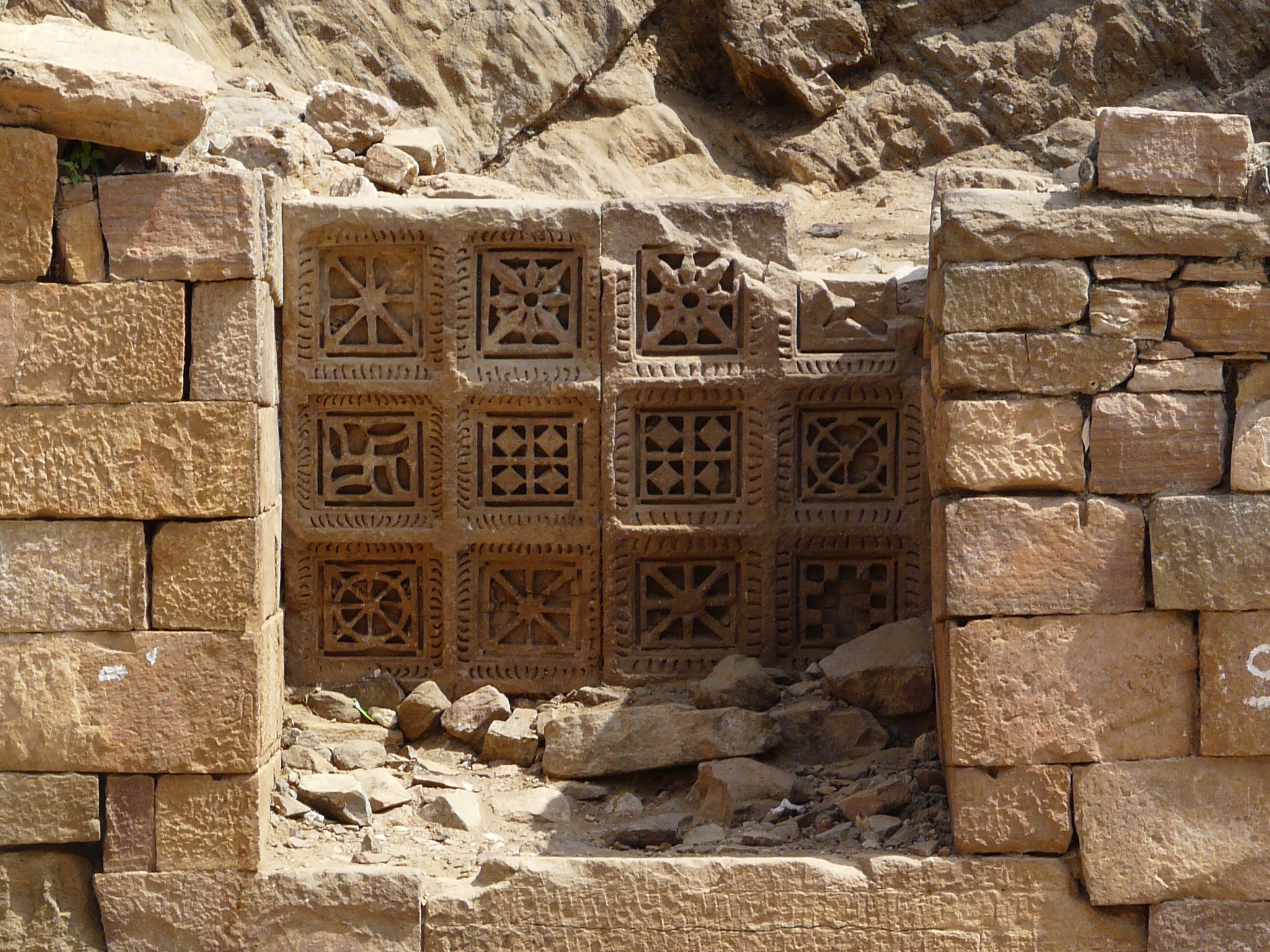
Niche

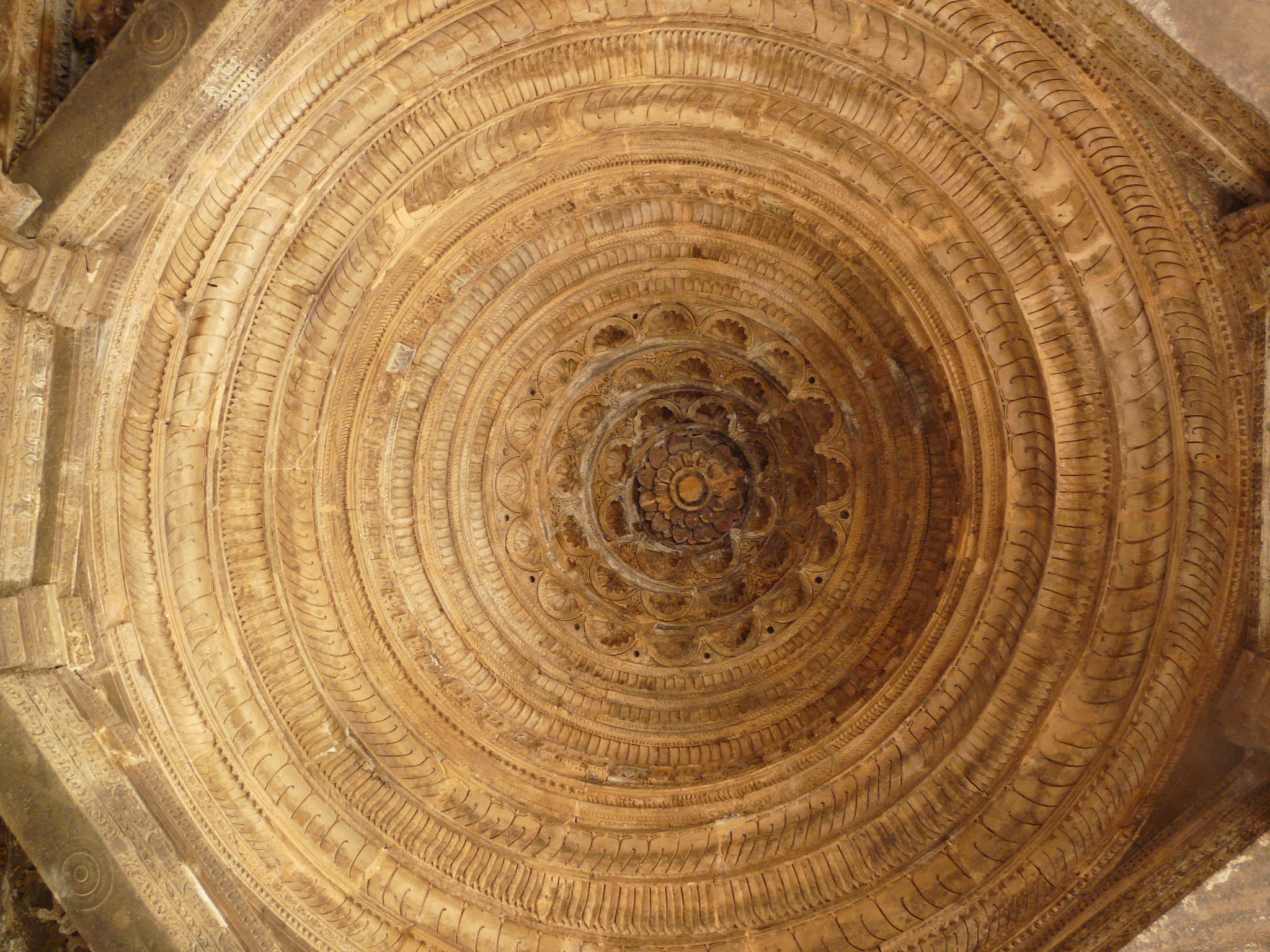
Dome interior

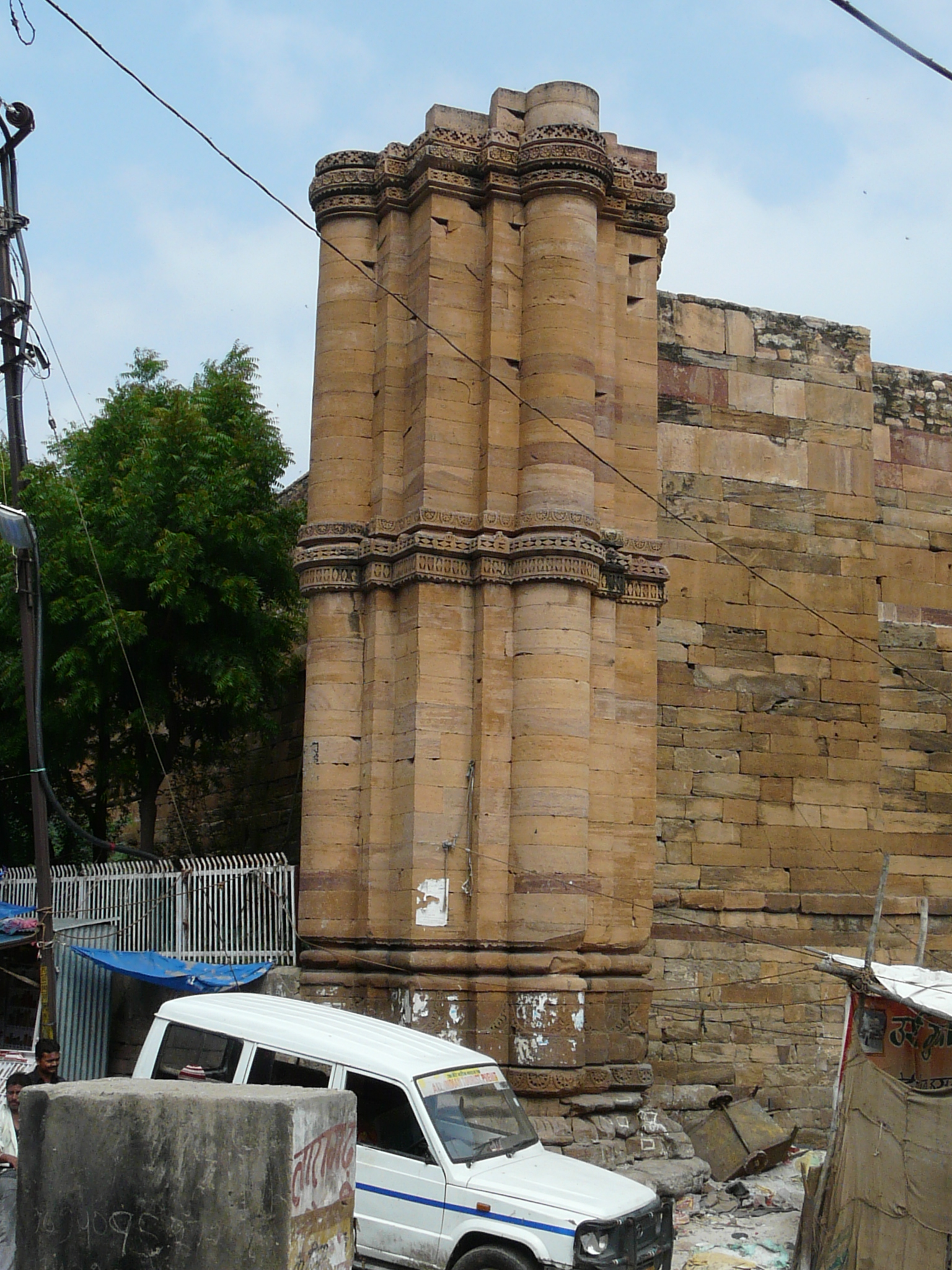
Minaret

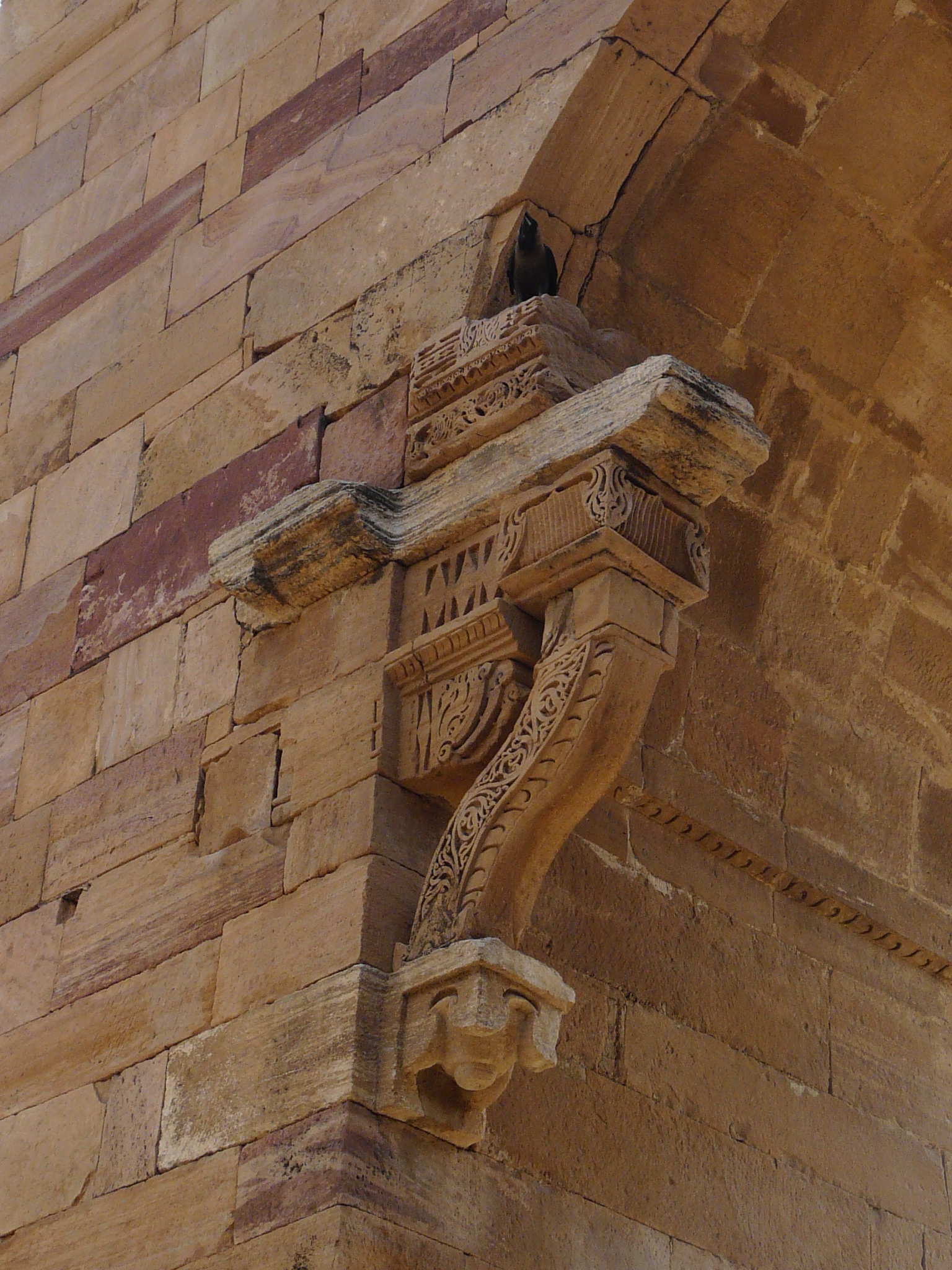
Bracket

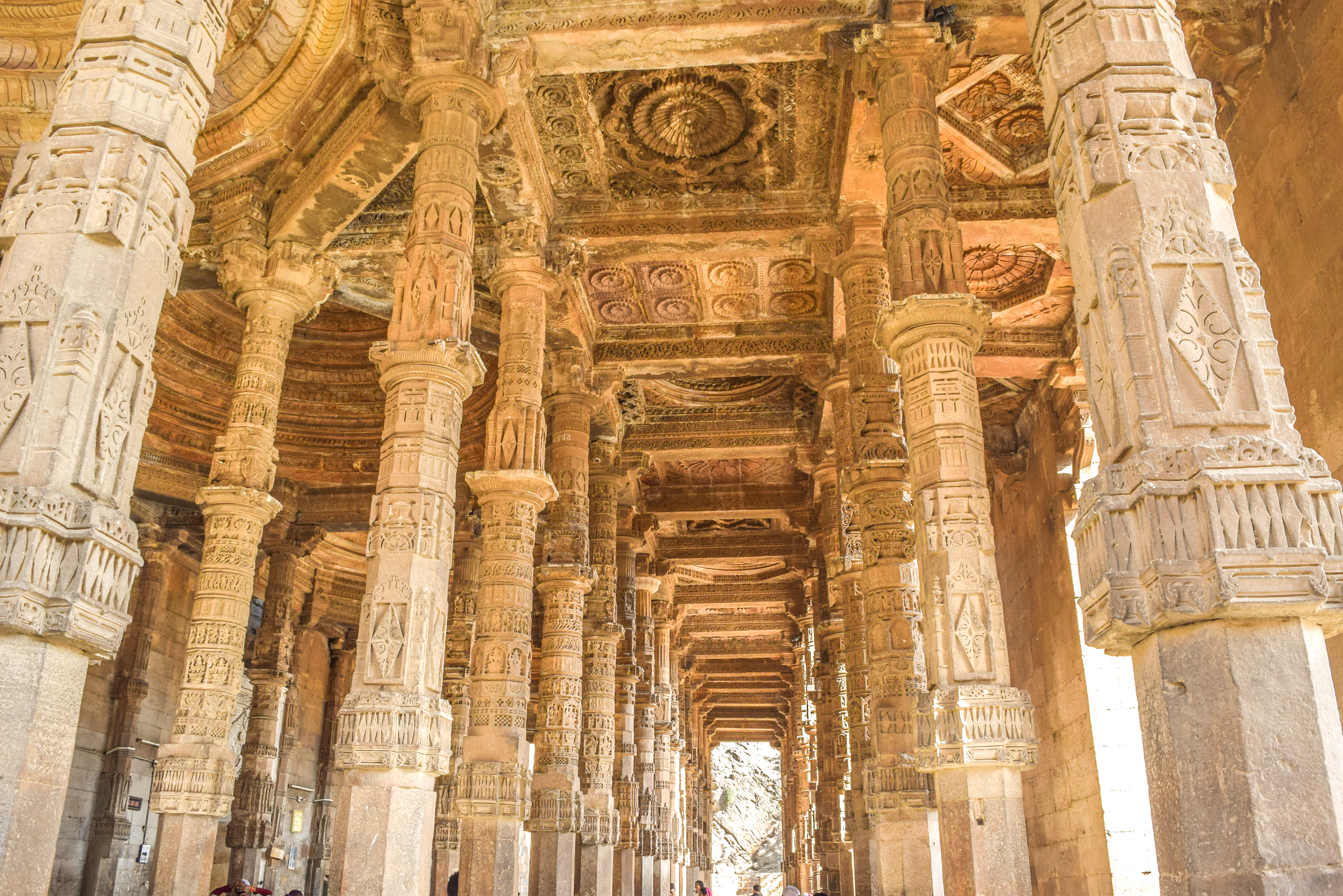
Arcade Pillars

Today, the site's architecture incorporates a mix of Indian, Hindu, Muslim, and Jain styles, and it serves as a destination for visitors of various faiths.
