= Beesalpur =

Village in Rajasthan, India

Coordinates: 25.954°N 75.452°E

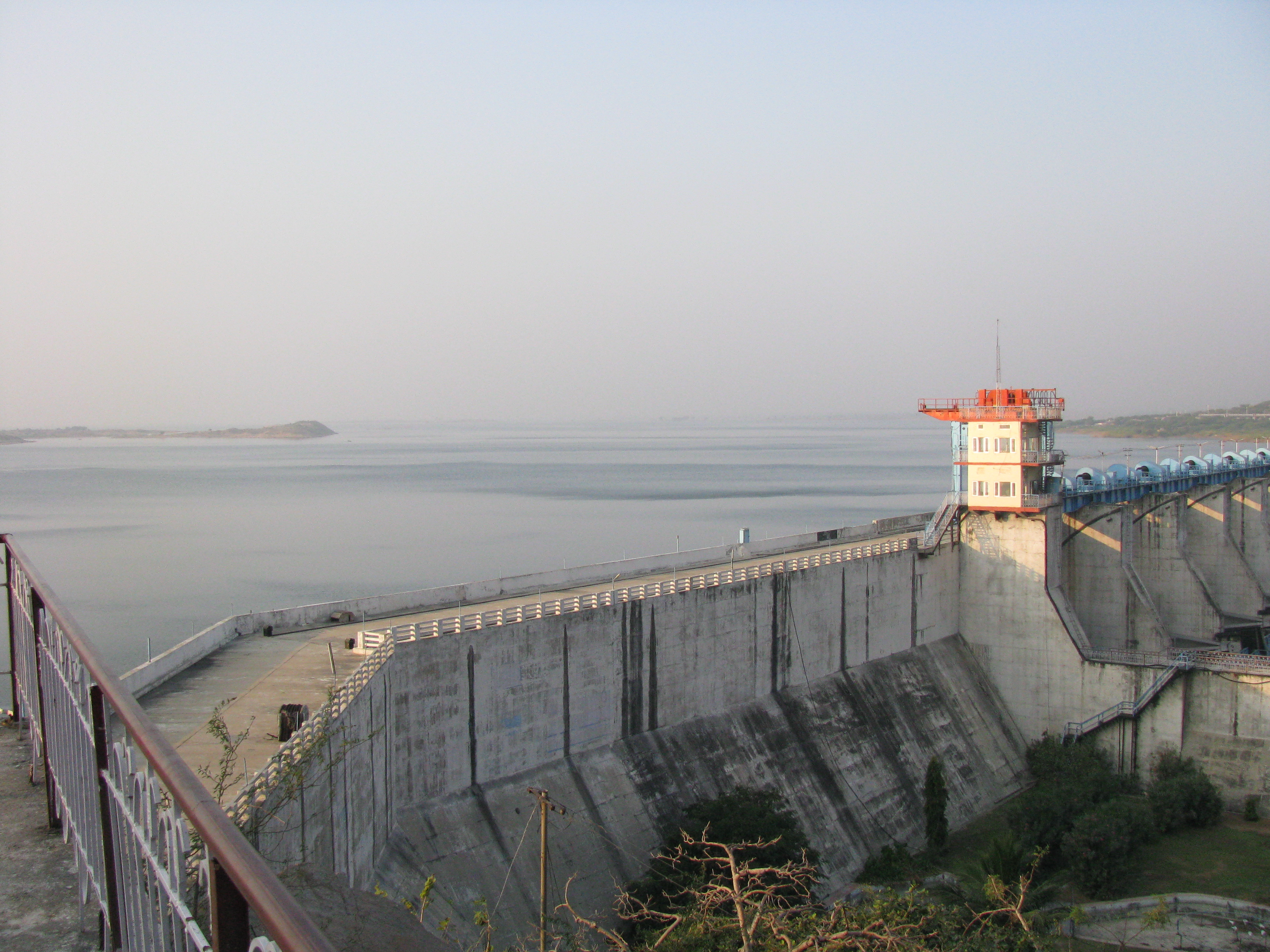
Bisalpur Dam

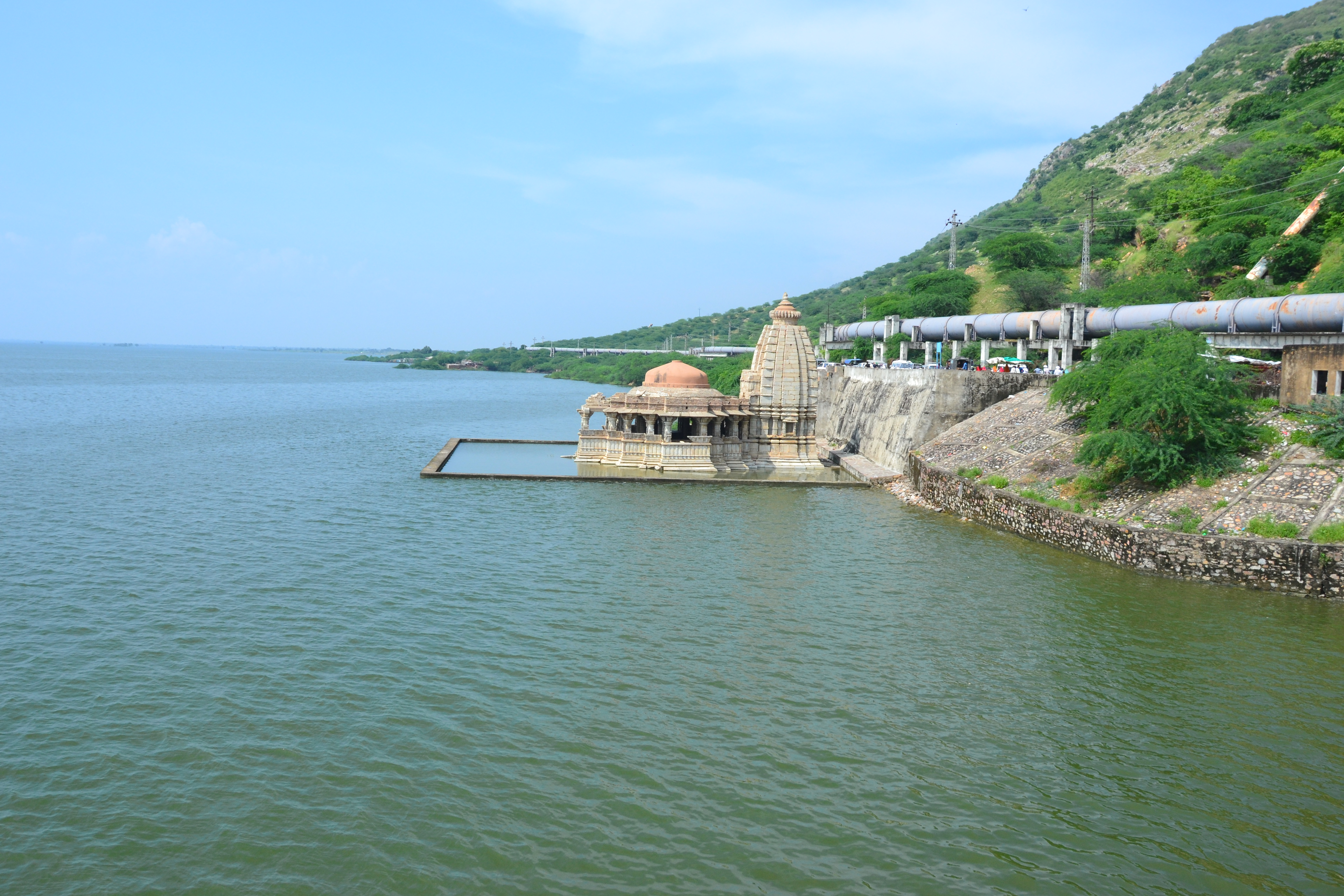
Bisaldeo temple

Beesalpur is a village in Deoli tehsil, Tonk district, Rajasthan, India, located at 31 km from main Deoli city. The population was 4,106 at the 2011 Indian census.

== Geography ==
=== Nearest districts ===
Beesalpur is located around 16 kilometres (9.9 mi) away from its district headquarters Agra. The other nearest district headquarters is Khalilabad situated at 35.9 kilometres (22.3 mi) distance from Beesalpur. Surrounding districts from Beesalpur are as follows.

- Firozabad district 33.6 kilometres (20.9 mi).
- Mathura district 57.2 kilometres (35.5 mi).
- Morena district 59.0 kilometres (36.7 mi).
- Etah district 61.4 kilometres (38.2 mi)

=== Nearest town/city ===
Beesalpur's nearest town/city/important place is Kheragarh located at the distance of 12.8 kilometres (8.0 mi). Surrounding town/city/TP/CT from Beesalpur are as follows.

- Kheragarh 12.8 kilometres (8.0 mi).
- Dhanauli 12.8 kilometres (8.0 mi).
- Kiraoli 16.4 kilometres (10.2 mi).
- Agra 19.9 kilometres (12.4 mi).
- Achhnera 21.7 kilometres (13.5 mi).

== Transport ==
=== By rail ===
The nearest railway station to Beesalpur is Bichpuri which is located in and around 15.8 kilometres (9.8 mi) distance. The following table shows other railway stations and its distance from Mamakudi.

- Bichpuri railway station 15.8 kilometres (9.8 mi).
- Idgah Agra Jn railway station 16 kilometres (9.9 mi).
- Kiraoli railway station 16.2 kilometres (10.1 mi).
- Raja Ki Mandi railway station 19.8 kilometres (12.3 mi).
- Agra Fort railway station 19.9 kilometres (12.4 mi).

=== By air ===
Beesalpur's nearest airport is Agra Air Force Station situated at 14.8 kilometres (9.2 mi) distance. Few more airports around Beesalpur are as follows.

- Agra Air Force Station - 14.8 kilometres (9.2 mi).
- Gwalior Airport - 88 kilometres (55 mi).
- Aligarh Airport - 94.9 kilometres (59.0 mi).

== Education ==
There are two primary government schools and one junior high school and one private ITI and Senior Secondary school in the village.
