= Bisaldeo temple =

- बीसलदेव मन्दिर
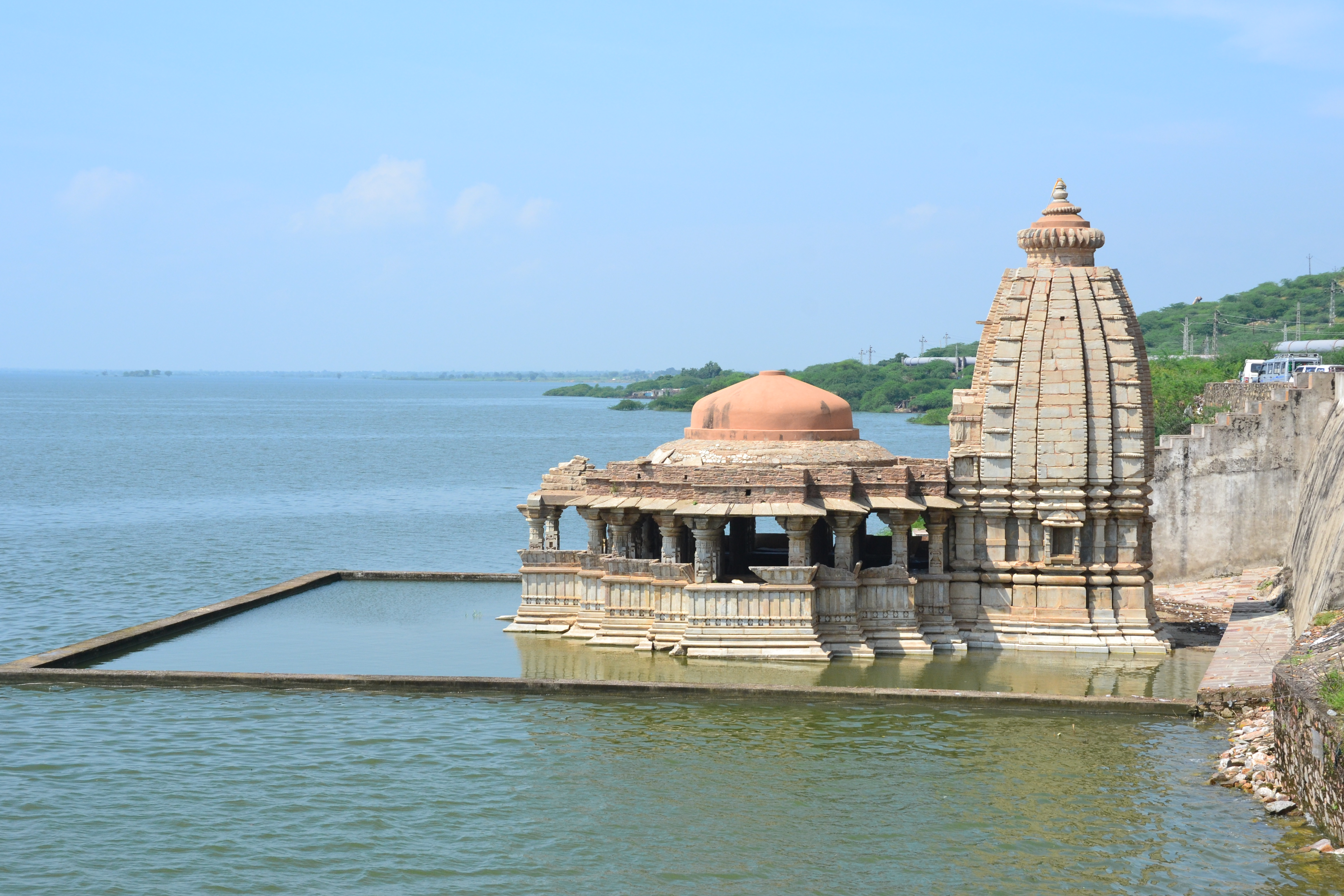
- Bisaldeo temple in 2016 with submerged courtyard

- Location in Rajasthan, India Bisaldeo temple (India)

Religion
- Affiliation: Shaivism
- District: Tonk
- Deity: Shiva

Location
- Location: Bisalpur
- State: Rajasthan
- Country: India
- Interactive map of Bisaldeo temple
- Coordinates: 25.9271197°N 75.4571403°E

Architecture
- Established: 1150–1164 CE

Bisaldeo temple, also known as Bisaldev temple or Bisal Deoji's temple, is a Hindu temple in Bisalpur, India. It is located beside the Bisalpur Dam on the Banas River, in the Tonk district of Rajasthan state. The temple is dedicated to Gokarneshvara, an aspect of Shiva. A Monument of National Importance, it was commissioned by the 12th century Chahamana ruler Vigraharaja IV, who is also known as Bisal Deo.

== History ==
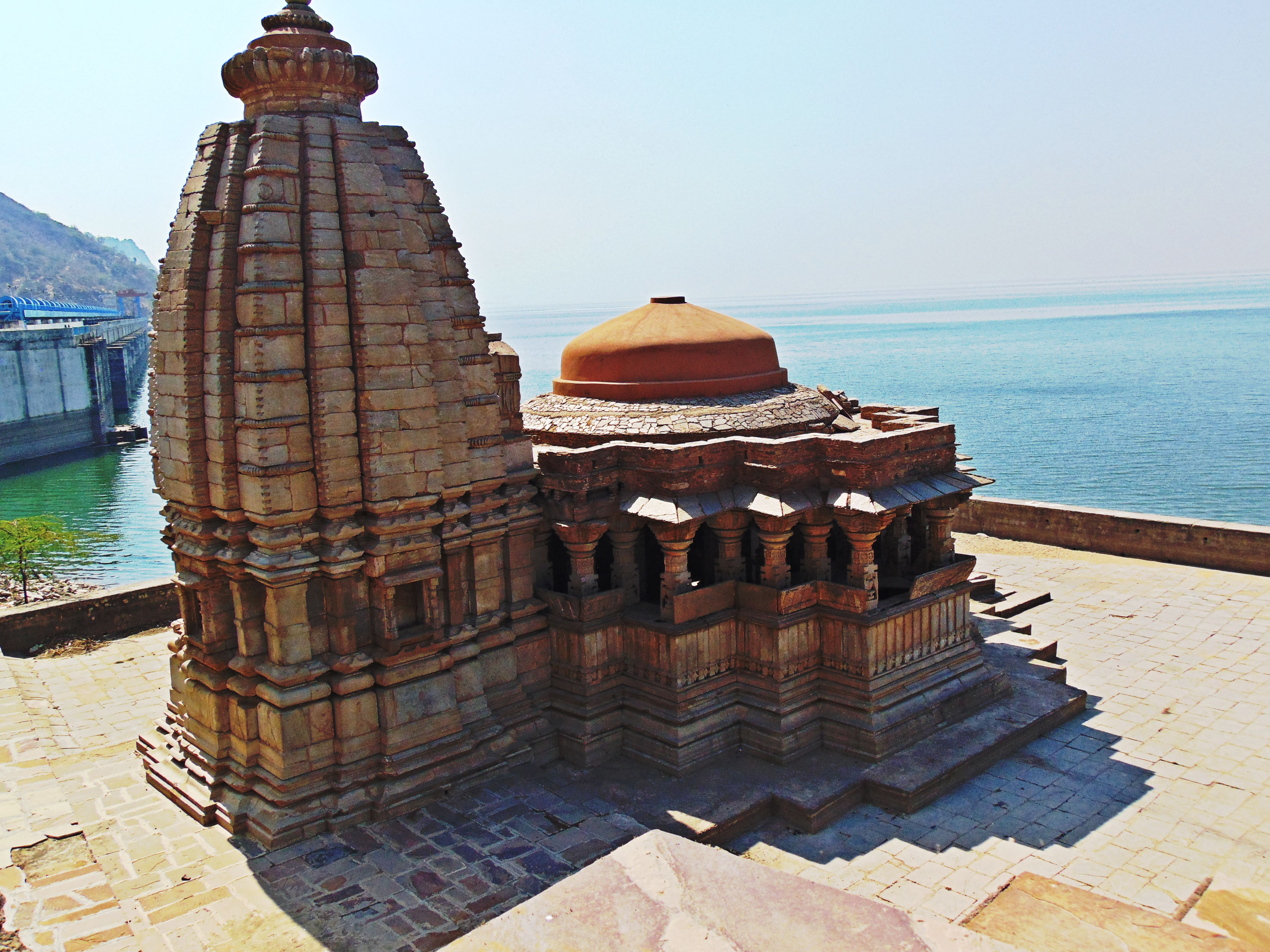
View of the temple with low water level in the reservoir

The temple is located in Bisalpur or Visalpur, which was also earlier known as Vigrahapura. The town was established by the Chahamana king Vigraharaja IV alias Visala or Bisal Deo (r. c. 1150–1164 CE). The king commissioned the temple that is now known as Bisal Deoji's temple.

The courtyard of the temple is now partly submerged by the waters of the Bisalpur Dam reservoir whenever the water level is high; before the construction of the dam in the 1990s, the temple stood on the top of a hill overlooking the confluence of the Banas and the Dai rivers.

The Archaeological Survey of India has classified the structure as a Monument of National Importance. The organization has also carried out a restoration of the temple.

== Architecture ==
The architectural plan of the temple measures 22.2 by 15.3 metres (73 by 50 ft). The building comprises a garbhagriha (sanctum), a shikhara (tower), an antarala (vestibule), a square mandapa (hall) with a hemispherical dome, and a portico. It features a pancharatha projection. The sanctum houses a linga (a symbol of Shiva).

The pillars of the temple feature carvings of floral festoons, chain-and-bell and circular medals.

== Inscriptions ==
Multiple short inscriptions recording pilgrim visits have been discovered at the site. Two of these are dated to the 12th century CE. An 1164–65 CE inscription records the visit of a Kayastha pilgrim. The name of the pilgrim is not clear, but his father's name can be read as Thakkura Shrivatsa. The inscription is dated to 15th day of the Shukla Paksha (fortnight) of the Pausha month of the Vikrama Samvat year 1221. An 1187–88 CE inscription records the donation of two sword handles in the mandapa (hall) of the temple of Śri Gokarṇa. It is dated to the Vikrama Samvat year 1244, which makes it one of the few extant inscriptions issued during the reign of Vigraharaja's nephew Prithviraja III.

Besides these, some shorter inscriptions have also been discovered at the site:

- A one-line pillar inscription at the temple entrance
- A three-line pillar inscription in the vestibule, which reads "Jogi Achpantadhaja"
- A two-line pillar inscription in the vestibule, which reads "Navva Guhilait"
- A three-line inscription, which simply mentions the word "Nava" three times
