= Khusrau Shah of Ghazna =

Ghaznavid sultan from 1157 to 1160

Khusrau Shah
- Ghaznavid Sultan

Sultan of the Ghaznavid Empire
- Reign: 1157 – 1160
- Predecessor: Bahram-Shah
- Successor: Khusrau Malik
- Born: c. 1121; Ghaznavid Empire
- Died: c. 1160 (aged 38–39); Ghaznavid Empire
- Issue: Khusrau Malik
Names
- Khusrau Shah bin Bahram Shah
- Dynasty: House of Sabuktigin
- Father: Bahram-Shah
- Religion: Sunni Islam

Khusrau Shah (b. 1121 – d. 1160) was the penultimate sultan of the Ghaznavid Dynasty from 1157 to 1160., and the eldest son of Bahram-Shah. During his short reign, he lost southeastern Afghanistan to Ala al-Din Husayn, Malik of Ghurid empire. He was succeeded by his son, Khusrau Malik.

== Background ==
Khusrau Shah was eldest and only surviving son of Bahram Shah. Due to civil wars, tributary pact with Seljuk Empire and struggles with Ghurid Empire, Ghaznavid Empire was in its weakest times. Although his father tried to recapture the lost lands in India, he was stopped by Vigraharaja IV, an Indian king from Chahamanas dynasty. His struggles with Ghurid Empire were also unsuccessful as he was defeated by two Ghurid Maliks. Later he was defeated by Ala al-Din Husayn, who burned Ghazni for seven days.

Bahram Shah recaptured Ghazni from Ghurids and later died in 1157. Nothing but few poems written by Hassan Ghaznavi remains about life of young Khusrau during reign of his father. It seems that he was a hostage to the court of Saljuk emperor, Ahmad Sanjar.

== Reign ==
Khusrau Shah became sultan in 1157. Shortly afterwards, Ala al-Din Husayn ran a new campaign. Although Minhaj-i-Siraj stated that Ala al-Din Husayn already had captured the Ghaznavid possessions in southeastern Afghanistan, including Zamindawar, according to Bosworth it could be "an anticipation of what actually happened". Fakhr-i Mudabbir stated a battle between two armies in which Khusrau Shah was defeated. According to O'Neal, Khusrau Shah rebuilt army and moved towards west to capture the western lands of Ghurids, but faced with Ala al-Din army in Herat, he was defeated. He was forced to agree with pact that gives the Ghurids mentioned lands.

Khusrau Shah's reign after war is mostly unknown, but it is known that he died in 1160 and was succeeded by his son Khusrau Malik, the last Ghaznavid Sultan, which was defeated by Ghurids and died sometime after 1184.

== Coinage ==
Few remaining Khusrau Shah coins stated Ahmad Sanjar as suzerain, although he died in 1157. Probably news of his death didn't reach Ghazni at the time.

== Sources ==
- Bosworth, C. E. (1977). The Later Ghaznavids: Splendour and Decay: the Dynasty in Afghanistan and Northern India, 1040–1186. Columbia University Press. ISBN 978-0-231-04428-8.
- Bosworth, C. E. (2013). "Ḵosrowšāh". Encyclopædia Iranica, online edition. New York.
- Bosworth, C. E. (2001). "GHAZNAVIDS". Encyclopædia Iranica, online edition. New York.
- Sharma, Dasharatha (1959). Early Chauhān Dynasties. S. Chand / Motilal Banarsidass. ISBN 9780842606189.
- Singh, R. B. (1964). History of the Chāhamānas. N. Kishore. OCLC 11038728.
- O'Neal, Michael (2013). "The Ghūrid Empire: Warfare, Kingship, and Political Legitimacy in Eastern Iran and Northern India". Tel Aviv University.

Preceded by Bahram-Shah	Sultan of the Ghaznavid Empire; 1157–1160	Succeeded by Khusrau Malik
