= Agra Airport =

Domestic airport in Agra, Uttar Pradesh, India

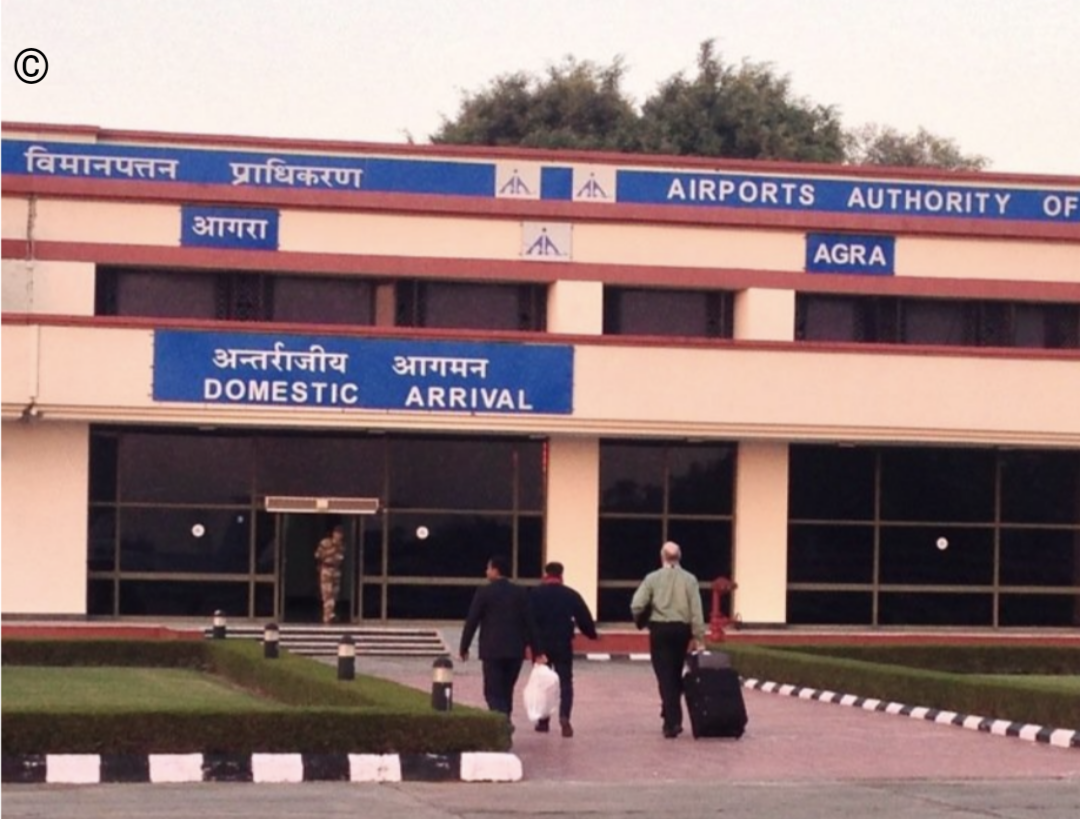
- IATA: AGR; ICAO: VIAG

Summary
- Airport type: Military/Public
- Owner: Indian Air Force
- Operator: Airports Authority of India
- Serves: Agra
- Location: Kheria, Agra, Uttar Pradesh, India
- Opened: 15 August 1947; 79 years ago
- Elevation AMSL: 551 ft (168 m)
- Coordinates: 27.1618309°N 77.9707261°E
- Website: Agra Airport

Map
- Location of airport in Uttar Pradesh AGR (India)

Runways
Direction	Length		Surface
Direction	ft	m	Surface
05/23	9,000	2,743	Concrete
12/30	5,964	1,818	Concrete

Statistics (April 2025 - March 2026)
- Passengers: 2,57,031 (▲52.7%)
- Aircraft movements: 2,345 (▲26.9%)
- Cargo tonnage: 102.7 (▲88.7%)
- Source: AAI

Agra Airport (IATA: AGR, ICAO: VIAG), also known as Kheria Airport, is a dual use airport with Indian Air Force base and a domestic airport civil enclave serving the Agra city in the state of Uttar Pradesh, India.

To meet the growing demands and traffic, the airport will get a new terminal building that will be much larger than the existing terminal, leading to enhanced connectivity and socio-economic growth in Agra and the rest of the state. Its foundation stone was laid by Prime Minister Narendra Modi in October 2024. Construction is set to begin by the second half of 2025, and is slated to be completed by the end of 2027 or by the first half of 2028.

== Background ==
=== Etymology ===
The airportis named after the eponymous city Agra. The airport has been proposed to be renamed after Pandit Deen Dayal Upadhyaya, a renowned independence activist, social reformer and leader.

=== History ===
The station was opened during the World War II as Royal Air Forces Station Agra and had a number of flying units located there. During World War II, the United States Army Air Forces Air Technical Service Command established a major maintenance and supply facility at Agra, named "Agra Air Depot". The 3rd Air Depot Group serviced a wide variety of fighter, bomber and transport aircraft being used by Tenth Air Force and the Allied ground forces in Burma and Fourteenth Air Force in China. The depot stockpiled large amounts of material for shipment over the Himalayan Mountains ("The Hump") by Air Transport Command cargo aircraft flying to forward airfields in China. It also was a major stopover point on the ATC Karachi-Kunming air transport route. The airport is mentioned in a chapter in Ernest Gann's Fate Is the Hunter, wherein he relays a story of coming within feet of destroying the Taj Mahal in a severely overloaded C-87 after takeoff.

It was closed after the World War II and transferred to the Royal Indian Air Force. The prefix Royal was later dropped and the station was later renamed as the Air Force Station Agra on 15 August 1947 and placed under the command of Wing Commander Shivdev Singh, who was the incumbent commander of the No. 12 Sqn. Based on the then-present system of Commands, the airfield fell under the responsibility of the Western Air Command (WAC). The base remained under this Theatre Command for the next two decades. In July 1971 it was transferred to the Central Air Command (CAC), where it remains today.

== Runway ==
The airport is served by runway 05/23, which is 2,743.2 meters (9,000 ft) long and 45 meters (148 ft) wide and runway 12/30, which is 1,817.83 meters (5,964.0 ft) long and 45 meters (148 ft) wide. The airport has ILS CAT-II compliant for landing during the bad weather and foggy conditions.

== Agra Air Force Station ==
The Agra air force station is one of the largest airbases of the Indian Air Force. During its history with the IAF, it has seen the likes of C-47 Dakotas, C-119 Packets, HS 748 'Avros', AN-12s, AN-32s, IL-76s, Canberras, IL-78 MKI, and now the Airborne Early Warning and Control/AWACS. The station also has the honor of holding the first inflight refueling aircraft Squadron in IAF service, with No. 78 ‘Mid Air Refuelling Squadron’ (MARS) Squadron flying the IL-78MKIs.

List of squadrons operating from Agra Air Force Station (under the aegis of the Central Air Command) includes:

1. No. 12 Squadron (An-32)
2. No. 50 Squadron (Beriev A-50EI)
3. No. 78 Squadron (Il-78MKI)
4. Unnamed flying squadron (C-295; inducted on 30 January 2025)

== Civil enclave ==
=== Terminal ===
The airport has one operational domestic terminal for the civil aviation and one planned. The current civil terminal has an area of 4,870 m^{2} (52,400 sq ft) with a capacity of 250 Arrivals and 250 Departures. Air Force Arjun Nagar Gate is dedicated to civil aviation passenger entry to the civil enclave of the airport.

=== Airlines and destinations ===
Airlines	Destinations
IndiGo	Bengaluru, Navi Mumbai

=== Statistics ===
The Airport had handled 1,19,868 arrivals and 1,19,890 departures in 2025, taking the total passenger traffic to 2,39,758 for the year 2024-25.

=== Future expansion ===
On 12 September 2023, the Uttar Pradesh cabinet cleared a 123 crore (US$15 million) proposal for land acquisition to expand the civil enclave of Agra Airport and upgrade the airport to international category. The proposed expansion plan will involve acquisition of 92.50 acres of land from Abhaypura, Balhera, and Dhanauli. The plan also includes building a 30,000 sqm new terminal equipped with nine bays to accommodate nine Airbus A321 aircraft, the extension of the present runways, and other airport facilities. The new terminal is expected to be built in the 36 months once all the approvals and funding have been granted.

== See also ==
- Airports in Delhi NCR with scheduled commercial flights
- Delhi NCR Transport Plan
- Lal Bahadur Shastri International Airport
- Hisar Airport
- List of airports in India
- List of the busiest airports in India
