= Harakeli Nataka =

Sanskrit drama

Harakeli Nataka is a Sanskrit drama written by the Chahamana (Chauhan) king Vigraharaja IV alias Visaladeva, who ruled from 1150 to 1164 CE. This drama is based on Kiratarjuniya of writer Bharavi.The play is also called Lalita Vigraharaja Nataka.

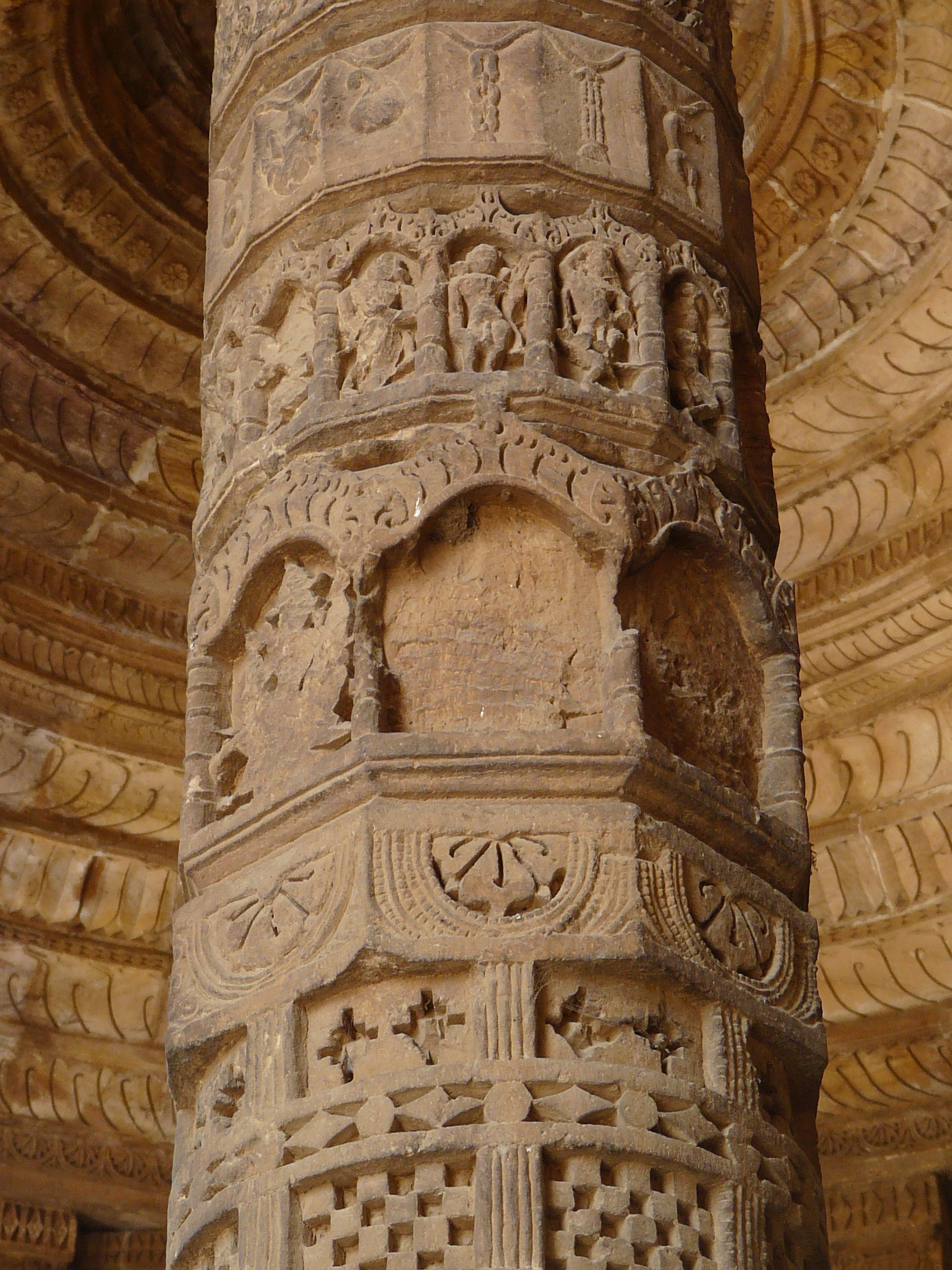
A Hindu-style column of the ruined Sanskrit college and Sarasvati temple at Ajmer, converted into the Adhai Din Ka Jhonpra mosque by Qutb al-Din Aibak

The only extant parts of Harakeli Nataka were found inscribed in the ruined Sanskrit college and Sarasvati temple at Ajmer, which was converted into the Adhai Din Ka Jhonpra mosque by Qutb al-Din Aibak, the first sultan of Delhi. It tells of his love with princess Desaldevi, and his war preparations against a Turushka (Turkic) king named Hammir.

== Plot ==
The plot of Harkeli Nataka involves Vigraharaja's preparations against a Turushka ruler named Hammira (Emir). In the story, his minister Shridhara tells him not to risk a battle with a powerful adversary. Nevertheless, Vigraharaja is determined to fight the Turushka king. He sends a message to his lover Desaladevi, informing her that the upcoming battle would soon give him an opportunity to meet her. The play describes Desaladevi as the daughter of prince Vasantapala of Indrapura. The play is available only in fragments, so the details of the ensuing battle are not known.

== Historicity ==
Historian Dasharatha Sharma identified Hammira with Khusrau Shah of Ghazna, and assumed that Vigraharaja repulsed his invasion.

Historian R. B. Singh, on the other hand, theorizes that no actual battle place between Vigraharaja and Hammira. According to Singh's theory, the "Hammira" on the play might have been Bahram Shah, who fled to India after the Ghurids defeated him at the Battle of Ghazni (1151). Bahram Shah invaded the Tomara territory of Delhi after coming to India. Vasantapala might have been a Tomara ruler, possibly Anangapala. Indrapura may refer to Indraprastha, that is, Delhi. Vigraharaja probably decided to send an army in support of the Tomara king. But before an actual battle could take place, Bahram Shah returned to Ghazna as the Ghurids had departed from that city.

== Bibliography ==
- R. B. Singh (1964). History of the Chāhamānas. N. Kishore. OCLC 11038728.
- Dasharatha Sharma (1959). Early Chauhān Dynasties. S. Chand / Motilal Banarsidass. ISBN 9780842606189.
