= Bisalpur Dam =

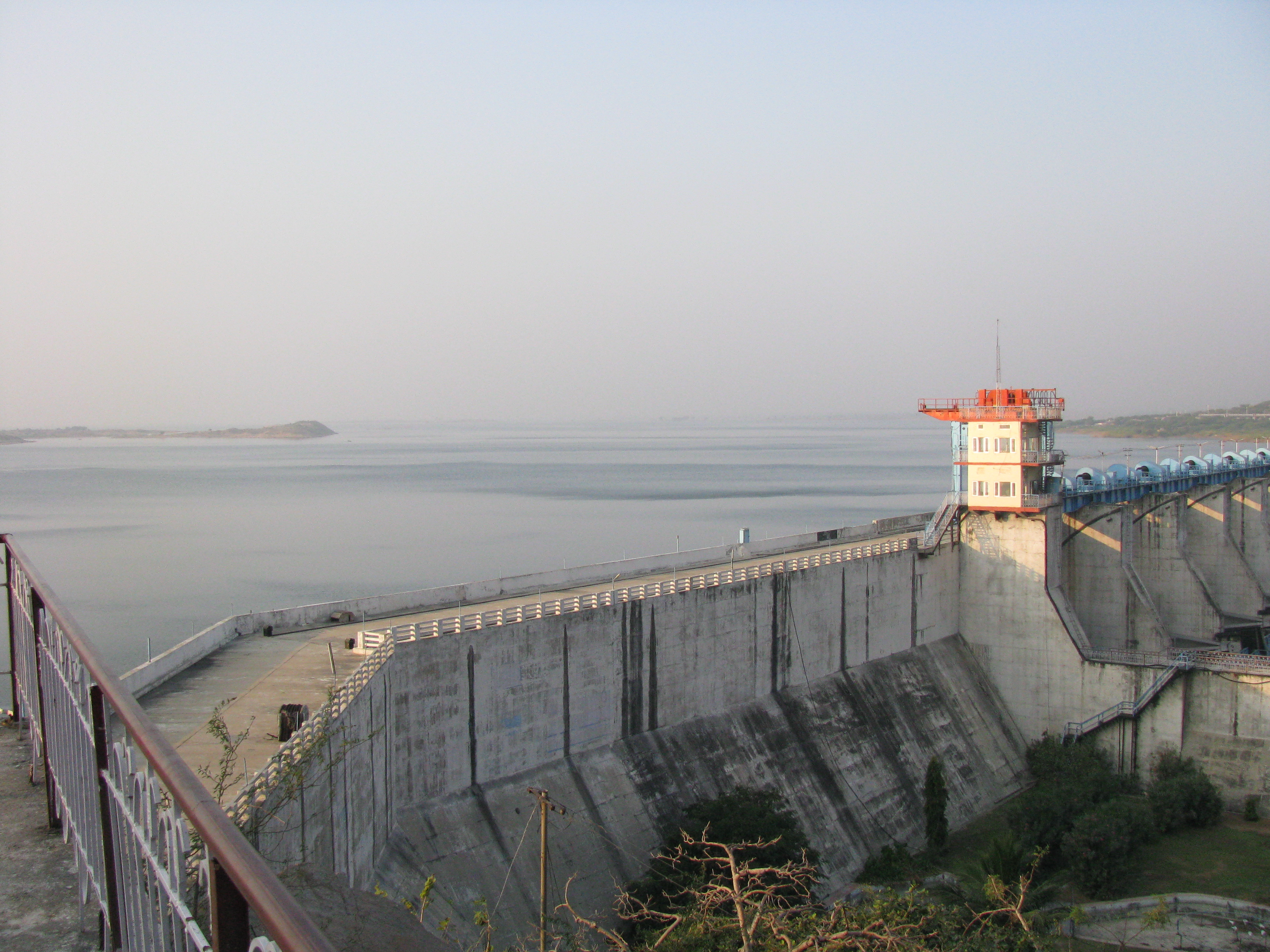
- Interactive map of Bisalpur Dam
- Official name: बीसलपुर बांध
- Country: India
- Location: Bisalpur, Deoli taluka, Tonk district, Rajasthan
- Coordinates: 25°55′28″N 75°27′20″E
- Opening date: 1999
- Construction cost: 556crores

Dam and spillways
- Type of dam: Gravity
- Height: 39.5 m (130 ft)
- Length: 574 m (1,883 ft)
- Spillway capacity: 29,046 m^{3}/s (1,025,750 cu ft/s)

Reservoir
- Total capacity: 1,100,000,000 m^{3} (891,785 acre⋅ft)
- Active capacity: 1,040,000,000 m^{3} (843,142 acre⋅ft)
- Surface area: 218.36 km^{2} (84 sq mi)

Bisalpur Dam is a gravity dam on the Banas River near Bisalpur in Tonk district, Rajasthan, India. The dam was completed in 1999 for the purpose of irrigation and water supply.

== History ==
The Bisalpur Dam was set in name of Bisaldev-IV of Chauhan Dynasty Ajmer.

The Bisalpur dam was constructed in the 1990s by the Rajasthan state government. During the construction, the people displaced by the dam protested against the state government's rehabilitation and resettlement policy, calling it unjust.

In October 1999, the Ashok Gehlot-led Congress government sanctioned a project to bring the Bisalpur reservoir water to the state capital Jaipur. However, the project could not be implemented because of financial constraints. In 2004, the Vasundhara Raje-led BJP government started the construction of a pipeline to bring Bisalpur water to Jaipur. The project was co-financed by the Asian Development Bank (ADB) and the Japan International Cooperation Agency (JICA). ADB financed the transmission system (including purification), while JICA financed the transfer system with an 8.88 billion yen 30-year loan at an interest rate of 1.3%. The project was opposed by farmers relying on the Bisalpur water for irrigation. On 13 June 2005, 5 farmers were shot dead while protesting the diversion of Bisalpur water to Jaipur. The Bisalpur water reached Jaipur in 2009, leading to public protests in surrounding districts like Ajmer, Bhilwara, Dausa and Tonk, whose residents demanded a share of the water.

== Water supply ==
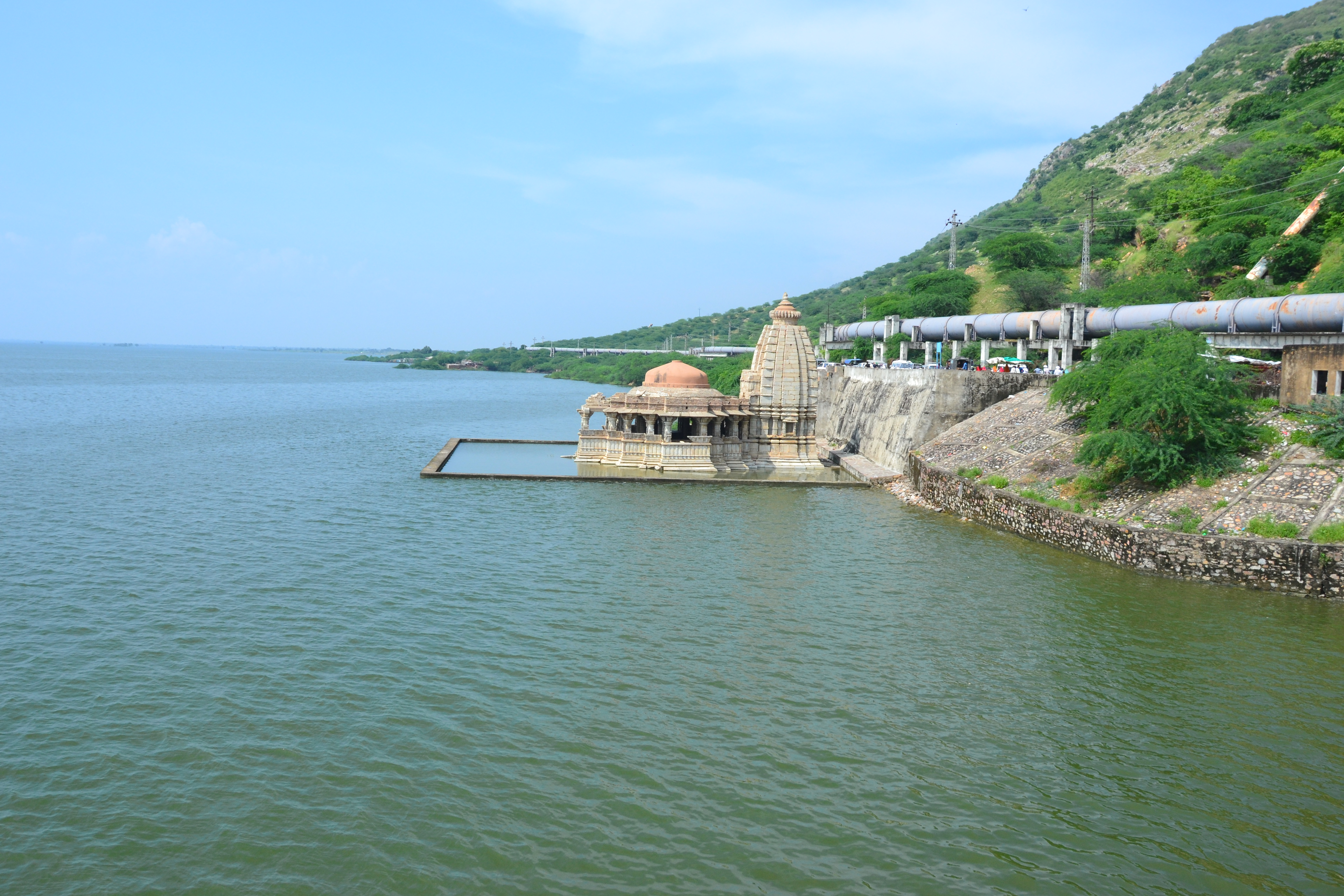
Bisaldeo temple and the dam reservoir

The Bisalpur dam reservoir supplies irrigation water to the Sawai Madhopur and Tonk districts. It also supplies drinking water to the Ajmer, Jaipur and Tonk districts. From Nasirabad in Ajmer district, the drinking water is also transported to the Bhilwara district via a 15-wagon train, which can carry 2.5 million litres of water.

The reservoir has been called the lifeline of the state capital Jaipur. Currently, around half of the areas under the Jaipur Municipal Corporation get water from Bisalpur. In 2016, the Public Health and Engineering Department (PHED) proposed a ₹ 9.5 billion project to supply the Bisalpur water to the remaining areas of the city.

In 2016, the almost-dry Pushkar Lake was filled with water from the Bisalpur reservoir for the annual Pushkar Fair.

== See also ==
- List of Dams and Reservoirs in India
