= Bisalpur, Nepal =

Coordinates: 29°22′N 80°25′E

Bishalpur, Nepal विशालपुर
- Village development committee
- Interactive map of Bishalpur, Nepal
- Country: Nepal
- Province: Sudurpashchim Province
- District: Baitadi District

Population (2011)
  - Total: 4,174
  - Religions: Hindu
- Time zone: UTC+5:45 (Nepal Time)

Bishalpur is a village development committee in Baitadi District in Sudurpashchim Province of western Nepal. At the time of the 2011 Nepal census it had a population of 4,174 and had 699 houses in the village.
