= Hara (Hinduism) =

Hara may refer to:

- an early name (Sanskrit: हर) of the deity Shiva, from the Harappan culture (Indus Valley Civilization)
- a name of the feminine aspect of God, rendered Harā
