= Dhanauli Rampur =

- Village
- Location in Uttar Pradesh, India Dhanauli Rampur (India)
- Coordinates: 26.236888°N 83.512824°E
- Country: India
- State: Uttar Pradesh
- District: Mau
- Tehsil: Ghosi

Government
  - Type: Panchayati raj (India)
  - Body: Gram panchayat

Languages
  - Official: Hindi
  - Other spoken: Bhojpuri
- Time zone: UTC+5:30 (IST)
- Pin code: 265303
- Telephone code: 05461
- Vehicle registration: UP-54
- Website: up.gov.in

Dhanauli Rampur is a village located in Ghosi tehsil of Mau district, Uttar Pradesh. It has total 530 families residing. Dhanauli Rampur has population of 3,452 as per government records.

== Administration ==
Dhanauli Rampur village is administrated by Gram Pradhan through its Gram Panchayat, who is elected representative of village as per constitution of India and Panchyati Raj Act. Dhanauli comes under Ghosi block

Particulars	Total	Male	Female
Total No. of Houses	530		
Population	3452	1751	1701

== Nearby places ==
- Ghosi
- Dohrighat
- Mau
- Barhalganj
- Azamgarh
- Gorakhpur
