= Dhanauli, Barabanki =

Dhanauli
- Village
- Interactive map of Dhanauli
- Country: India
- State: Uttar Pradesh
- District: Barabanki

Population (2001)
  - Total: 24,900

Languages
  - Official: Hindi
- Time zone: UTC+5:30 (IST)
- PIN: 225416
- Vehicle registration: UP-41

Dhanauli is a village in Barabanki district in the state of Uttar Pradesh, India.

== Location and composition ==
Dhanauli is close to Tehsil Haidergarh. The village is divided into three gram panchayats: Dhanauli Khas, Dhanauli Mishraan and Dhanauli Thakuran.

It is a village panchayat in Banikoder Block, Barabanki District. It has five census villages: Dhanauli khas, Purepathak, Puredubey, Purebaniya, Pureitiha.

=== Dhanauli Misraan ===
Dhanauli Misraan (or Mishran) is named after the fact that this is mostly populated by the Mishras (The surname being "Mishra"). It is a village panchayat in Banikoder Block, Barabanki District. It has two census villages: Ohar Pur, and Dhanauli Misran.

=== Dhanauli Thakuran ===
Dhanauli Thakuran is named after the fact that this is mostly populated by the Thakurs (Thakurs belong to warrior clan).

== History ==
Dhanauli was the subject of media coverage in August 2007 when child workers from the village were rescued from a foam factory in Karnal, Haryana.

== Education ==
Dhanauli has the following schools:

- Dhanauli khas
  - P.S. Dhanauli khas
  - P.S. Pathkanpur
  - J.H.S. PurePathak
- Dhanauli Misraan
  - P.S. Oharpur

== Notable people ==
- Ram Sagar Rawat, a local politician and four-time MP (9th, 10th, 11th, 13th Lok Sabha) for the constituency of Barabanki, was born here.
