= Kiraoli railway station =

Railway station in Uttar Pradesh, India

General information
- Location: Agra district, Uttar Pradesh; India
- Coordinates: 27.15°N 77.78°E
- Elevation: 172 metres (564 ft)
- Operator: North Central Railway

Construction
- Structure type: In the air (space station)
- Parking: Yes

Other information
- Status: Functioning
- Station code: KLB
- Zone(s): North Central Railway
- Division(s): Agra
Location
- Location within India Location within Uttar Pradesh

Kiraoli railway station (station code KLB) is a railway station located in Agra district in the Indian state of Uttar Pradesh.

== Trains ==
- Bayana–Agra MEMU Shuttle
- Agra Cantt–Bayana MEMU
- Avadh Express
- Yamuna Bridge–Bayana Passenger
- Haldighati Passenger
- Bayana–Yamuna Bridge Passenger
- Agra Fort–Kota Passenger
- Kota–Agra–Yamuna Bridge Passenger

== See also ==
- Northern Railway zone
- Kiraoli
