= Dhanauli =

Town in Uttar Pradesh, India

Dhanauli Dhanoli
- Town
- Location in Uttar Pradesh, India Dhanauli (India)
- Coordinates: 27°08′30″N 77°57′48″E
- Country: India
- State: Uttar Pradesh
- District: Agra

Government
  - Body: Gram Panchayat

Population (2011)
  - Total: 28,990

Language
  - Official: Hindi
  - Additional official: Urdu
- Time zone: UTC+5:30 (IST)
- Vehicle registration: UP 80

Dhanauli is a census town in Agra district in the Indian state of Uttar Pradesh, India.

== Demographics ==
According to 2011 Indian Census, Dhanauli had a total population of 28,990, of which 15,553 were males and 13,437 were females. Population within the age group of 0 to 6 years was 4,820. The total number of literates in Dhanauli was 15,486, which constituted 53.4% of the population with male literacy of 62.5% and female literacy of 43.0%. The effective literacy rate of 7+ population of Dhanauli was 64.1%, of which male literacy rate was 75.0% and female literacy rate was 51.5%. The Scheduled Castes and Scheduled Tribes population was 17,145 and 41 respectively. Dhanauli had 4630 households in 2011.

As of 2001 India census, Dhanauli had a population of 23,475. Males constitute 54% of the population and females 46%. Dhanauli has an average literacy rate of 68%, higher than the national average of 59.5%: male literacy is 79% and, female literacy is 55%. In Dhanauli, 19% of the population is under 6 years of age.
