= Hammira Mahakavya =

Epic poem by Nayachandra Suri

- Author: Nayachandra Suri
- Original title: हम्मीर महाकाव्य
- Language: Sanskrit
- Subject: Biographical epic poem
- Genre: Epic, Eulogy
- Publication date: Early 15th century
- Publication place: India
- Translation: Hammira Mahakavya at Wikisource

Hammira Mahakavya (IAST: Hammīra-Mahākāvya) is a 15th-century Indian Sanskrit epic poem written by the Jain scholar Nayachandra Suri. It is a legendary biography of the 13th century Chahamana king Hammira. While not entirely accurate from a historical point-of-view, the text provides valuable information about the medieval history of north-western India.

Much of the text describes Hammira's ancestry and his conquests of the neighbouring Hindu kingdoms. The third last part describes his conflict with Ala-ud-Din Khalji, the Sultan of Delhi. The text attributes Hammira's defeat against Ala-ud-Din to betrayal by his officers.

== Authorship and date ==
Hammira Mahakavya was composed by the Jain scholar Nayachandra Suri. The author's grandfather and teacher Jayasiṃha Sūri was a poet and a scholar. Jayasiṃha knew six languages, and composed three works - Nyāya Sāraṭika, a Sanskrit grammar, and a poem on Kumāra Nṛpati. The author was not a contemporary of the text's hero Hammira. He was possibly a court poet of the Tomara ruler Vīrama, since he states that he wrote the text as a response to a challenge in Virama's court that no contemporary poet was capable of composing a kāvya comparable to the works composed by the ancient poets such as Kalidasa, Bilhana and others. Nayachandra also states that Hammira appeared in his dream urging him to compose Hammira-Mahākāvya.

The author states that Hammira appeared in his dream exactly 100 years after his death (which happened in 1301). This suggests that the composition of the poem must have begun in 1401. However, the exact date and place of the text's origin are not certain. According to scholar Cynthia Talbot, it was probably composed around 1400 CE, possibly to please a Chauhan (Chahamana) ruler. Based on the assertion that the poem was written as a response to a challenge in Virama's court, Phyllis Granoff theorizes that the poem was written at the Tomara court, around 1420 CE.

Nayachandra's disciple Nayahamsa made a copy of the manuscript in 1496 CE, at "Sri Perojpur" (possibly Firozpur, although this is not certain). This manuscript was used by N. J. Kirtane to produce an editio princeps. Nayahamsa also added an appendix, which praises Nayachandra Suri and his spiritual lineage. Kirtane received the manuscript from a person of Nashik, who had received it from someone else.

== Content ==
The Hammīra-Mahākāvya consists of 1500 verses, divided into 14 sargas (cantos). The poem begins with an invocation to Hindu deities and Jain tirthankaras. The poet uses several words with double meanings that can refer to either a Hindu deity or a Jain tirthankara. E.g.:

- "Nābhibhū" ("navel-born" or "progeny of Nabhi") can mean Brahma or the first tirthankara Rishabhanatha
- "Śrī Pārśva" can mean Vishnu or Parshvanatha
- "Śaṃkara Vīravibhu" can mean Shiva or Mahavira
- "Bhīsvān Śānti" can mean Surya (the sun) or Shantinatha
- "Samudra Janman" can refer to Soma (the moon) or Neminatha

The poem then describes the life Hammira, who is compared to the legendary heroes Mandhata, Yudhishthira and Rama.

Cantos 1-4 are devoted to Hammira's ancestors, including kings from the Shakambhari Chahamana dynasty. Cantos 5-7 describe Hammira's engagement in various services, sports and festivities. The information contained in this part is of little historical value. The next few cantos describe his reign. The last third part of the text describes Hammira's conflict with Ala-ud-Din Khalji, the Muslim Sultan of Delhi.

=== Hammira's ancestors ===
The text gives the following line of succession of the Chahamana kings, which does not match exactly with the historical genealogy of the dynasty:

- Chahamana
- Vasudeva
- Naradeva
- Chandraraja
- Jayapala Chakri
- Jayaraja
- Samantasimha
- Guyaka
- Nandan
- Vapraraja
- Hariraja
- Simharaja
- Bhima
- Vigraharaja
- Gangadeva
- Vallabharaja
- Rama
- Chamundaraja
- Durlabharaja
- Dushala
- Vishvala
- Prithviraja
- Alhana
- Anala
- Jagadeva
- Visala
- Jayapala
- Gangapala
- Someshvara
- Prithviraja
- Hariraja
- Govinda
- Bilhana
- Prahlada
- Viranarayana
- Vagabhata
- Jaitrasingh
- Hammira

Much of the information about these ancestors is fanciful in nature. For example, the dynasty's mythical progenitor Chahamana (or Chohan) is described as follows: Once Brahma wandered in search of a holy place for a sacrifice. The lotus held in has hand fell at a spot that later came to be known as Pushkar. Brahma decided to conduct a sacrifice at that place, and invoked Surya (the sun) to protect his sacrifice from the danavas (demons). A hero then sprung from the orb of the sun, and protected Brahma's sacrifice. With Brahma's blessings, this hero became a powerful king.

Even the description of Hammira's historical ancestors does not provide much information of historical value. For example, Chandraraja is described as follows:

Hammira Mahakavya on Chandraraja

Chandraraja, by his fame and the beauty of his countenance achieving a double conquest over the moon, vindicated the appropriate significance of his name which means 'Lord of the moon'. Strange was the power of the fire of his valour, for it burnt bright in the enemy in whom the stream of bravery flowed, while it was extinguished in that enemy who was destitute of this stream.

The description of the events from the death of Prithviraja III to the reign of Hammira is fairly historical, but still not entirely accurate.

=== Legend of Prithviraja III ===
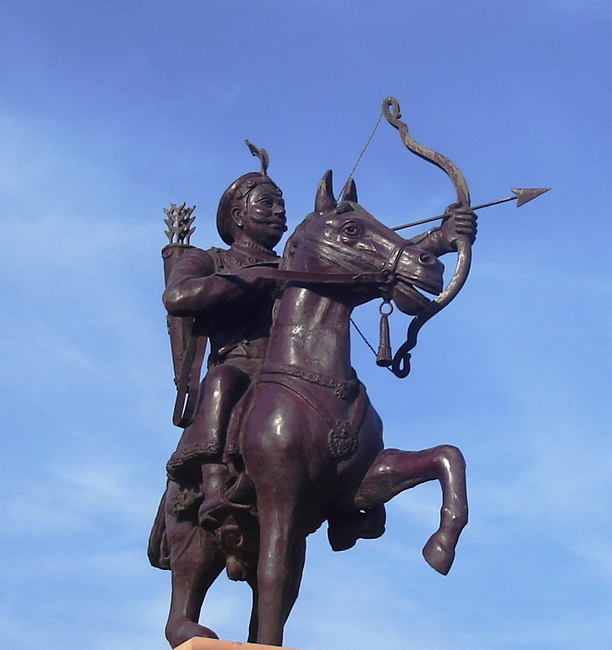
A statue of Prithviraja III

The text describes Prithviraja III's war against Muhammad of Ghor (Shahb-ud-Din) as follows: During the just rule of Prithviraja in the East, the Muslim king Shahab-ud-Din began attempts to subjugate the earth. The kings of the West, led by one Chandraraja, appealed Prithviraja to counter Shahab-ud-Din. Chandraraja told Prithviraja that Shahab-ud-Din had set up his capital at Multan, and had defeated the noblest of the Hindu Rajput kings. The invader had burned their cities, dishonoured their women and reduced them to a sorry state. Chandraraja compared Shahab-ud-Din to Parashurama, who had come to exterminate the warrior caste from the earth.

On hearing this, Prithviraja became angry, and declared that he would force Shahab-ud-Din to beg them for an apology on his knees. After some days, he marched towards Multan and entered Shahab-ud-Din's territory. When the enemy king learned of this, he also set out from Multan, with an army. In the ensuing battle, Prithviraja defeated and captured Shahab-ud-Din. The Muslim king was made to bend on his knees, and seek forgiveness from the Rajput kings he had harassed. Subsequently, Prithviraja presented expensive gifts to all the kings (including Shahab-ud-Din), and asked them to return home.

Despite being well-treated after his defeat, Shahab-ud-Din felt humiliated and sought revenge. He invaded Prithviraja's kingdom seven more times, but each time, he was defeated. Finally, he decided to seek help from the king of the Ghataika country. From this king, he obtained a large infantry and cavalry, and captured Delhi. When Prithviraja heard about this, he had only a small force stationed at his capital Ajmer. He asked his general Udayaraja to gather a larger army, and immediately set out against Shahab-ud-Din with the small force. Although Prithviraja's contingent was small, Shahab-ud-Din was terrified at this news. At night, he sent some men to Prithviraja's camp and bribed the cavalry chief and the royal musicians.

The next morning, Shahab-ud-Din sent a force to attack Prithviraja's camp. Prithviraja asked his men to prepare for war. The disloyal cavalry chief presented him a dancing horse named Natyarambha. As soon as the king mounted this horse, the disloyal musicians started playing music. The horse started dancing to the music, and this performance diverted the king's attention. Meanwhile, the Muslim soldiers managed to kill a number of Rajputs. Prithviraja finally came to his senses, dismounted from the horse, and killed a number of attackers. But then he fell to the ground after an enemy soldier attacked him from behind. He was taken captive just as Udayaraja arrived with a larger army. Fearing Udayaraja's army, Shahab-ud-Din retreated to Delhi but took the captive Prithviraja with him. Udayaraja besieged Yoginipura (Delhi) for a month, in a bid to rescue Prithviraja.

After being captured, Prithviraja refused to eat any food. One of Shahab-ud-Din's advisors remarked that he should release Prithviraja, who had released the Muslim king with honour in past. Shahab-ud-Din became angry at this suggestion, and ordered Prithviraja to be imprisoned in the fortress. Prithviraja died after a few days. When Udayaraja heard about this, he led his entire army to a decisive battle, in which he was defeated and killed.

Prithviraja was succeeded by Hariraja. The new king spent most of his time in company of female dancers, who had been presented to him by the king of Gujarat. Hariraja squandered the state's revenues on dancers and musicians, even as the state's employees were not paid their salaries. Shahab-ud-Din took advantage of these circumstances, and invaded Hariraja's kingdom. Hariraja, who was not prepared for a fight, chose to die by self-immolation (sak), along with his family members.

=== Legend of the Ranthambore branch ===
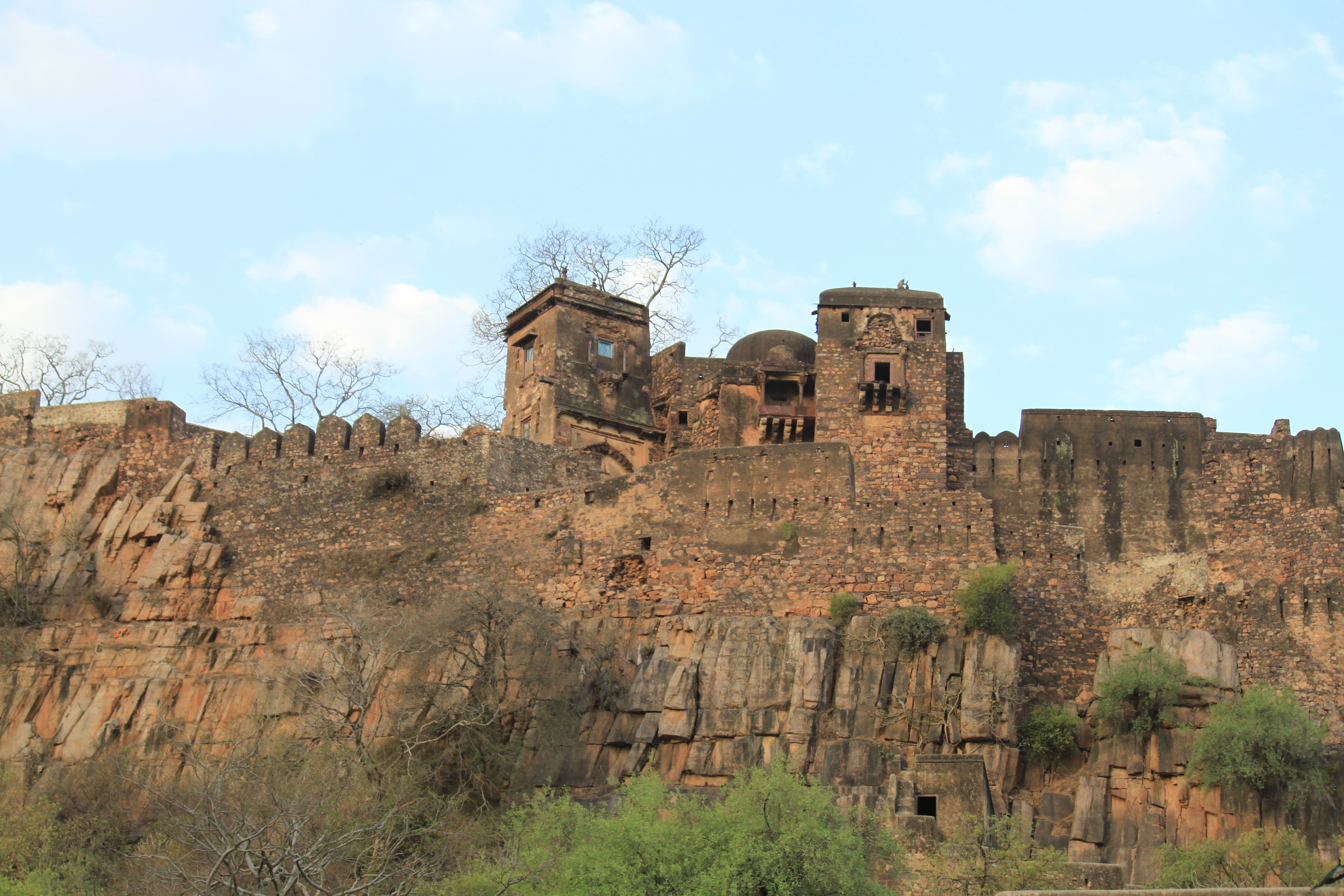
Ranthambore Fort

Govindaraja had established a new kingdom with its capital at Ranathambore, after being banished by his father. Following Hariraja's defeat, several of Ajmer's officials sought his asylum. Govindaraja treated them well, and appointed them to suitable offices. After Govindaraja's death, Balhana ascended the throne. Before his death, Balhana appointed his elder son Prahlada as the new king, and his younger son Vagabhata as the prime minister. Prahlada once killed a lion during a hunting expedition. As his party celebrated the killing, another lion severely injured him. On his deathbed, Vagabhata promised to serve his son Viranarayana faithfully.

When Viranarayana became an adult, his marriage was arranged to the Kachhavaha princess of Jayapura. He set out for the Kachhavaha capital Amarapur for the marriage ceremony, but was forced to retreat because of a surprise attack by the Delhi Sultan Jalal-ud-din. Unable to defeat Viranarayana in the battle, Jalal-ud-Din made a plan to subdue him using deceitful means. He sent a flattering message to Viranarayana, stating that he was greatly impressed by his bravery, and wanted to be friends. Viranarayana believed that a friendship with the Delhi Sultan would help him against his rival, Vigraha of Vakshasthalapura. He, therefore, accepted the Jalal-ud-Din's invitation to Delhi. Vagabhata advised him against this move, but the king insultingly rejected his advice. A dejected Vagabhata left for Malwa. Other courtiers also advised Viranarayana against accepting Jalal-ud-din's friendship, but the king didn't heed their advice. He went to Delhi, where he was received warmly, but ended up being poisoned after a few days.

Jalal-ud-Din then captured Ranthambore, and sent a message to the king of Malwa ordering him to kill Vagabhata. But Vagabhata discovered this, and killed the king of Malwa. He then gathered an army of Rajputs, and formed an alliance with the Kharpuras (Mongols), who had rebelled against the Delhi Sultanate. With this army, he recaptured Ranthambore. He safeguarded the kingdom by placing large forces at the various frontier posts, and died after a reign of 12 years.

Vagabhata was succeeded by Jaitrasingh. He fulfilled the desire of his pregnant queen Hira Devi to "bathe herself in the blood of the Sakas (Muslims)". When her son Hammira was born, the astrologers predicted that he would drench the earth with the blood of his Muslim enemies. Hammira grew up to be a handsome man, and his father arranged his marriage to 7 beautiful women. In 1283 CE, Jaitrasingh appointed Hammira as his successor, and retired to forest.

=== Hammira's early reign ===
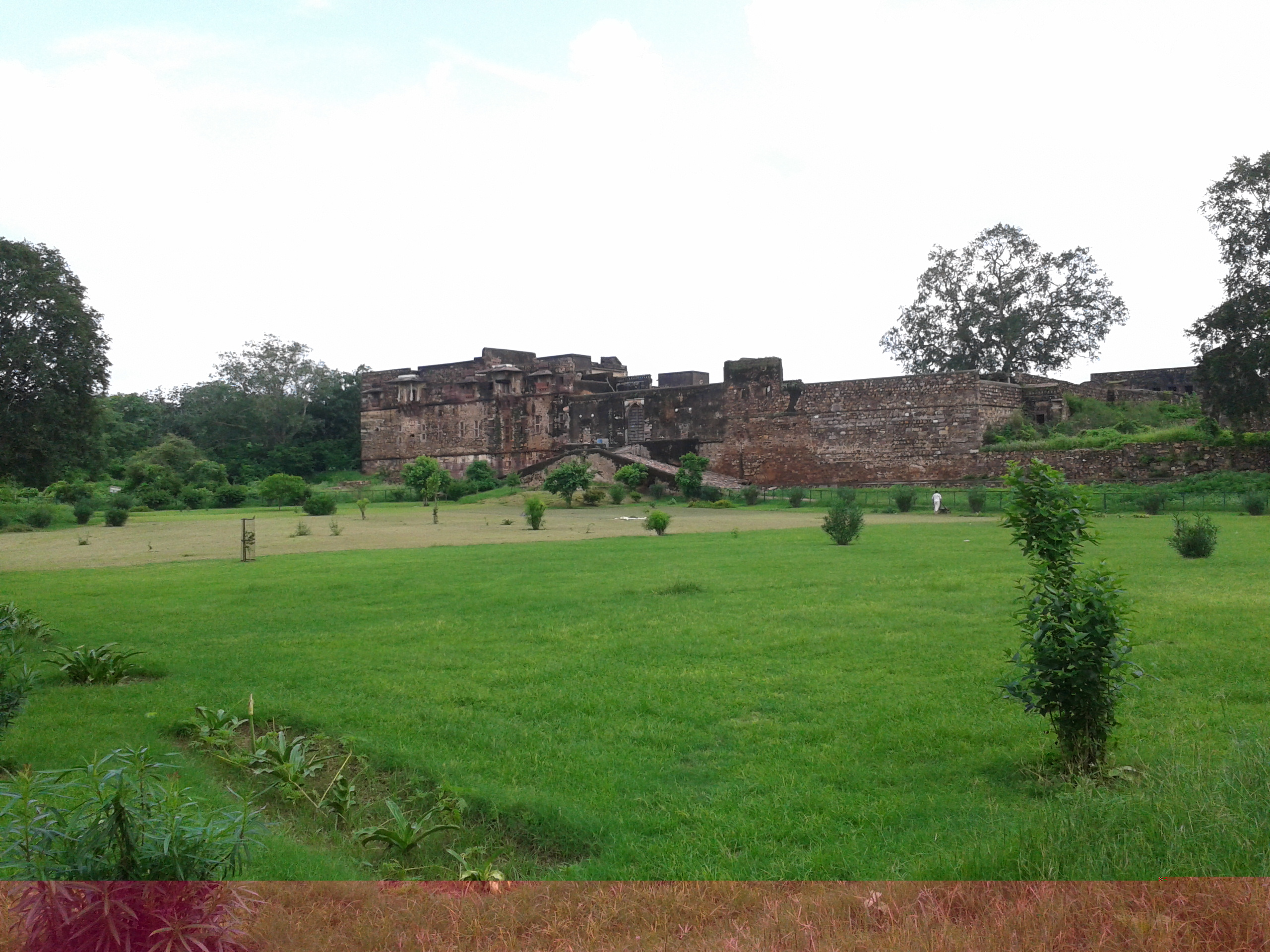
Hammira's palace at the Ranthambore Fort

Soon after becoming the king, Hammira waged wars to expand his kingdom. First, he subdued Arjuna, the king of Saraspura. Next, he forced the ruler of Gadhamandala to pay him a tribute. After this, he marched to Malwa, where he defeated Bhoja II. His army marched in a victory procession at Ujjain, where he prayed to Mahakala. On the way back to Ranthambore, he marched to Chitrakuta (Chittor), and sacked Medapata (modern Mewar).

Subsequently, Hammira stayed for some days at the ashram of sage Vasishtha. Although he followed the religion of the Vedas, he also prayed at the temple of the Jain tirthankara Rishabhadeva.

Hammira then marched to Abu. The king of Abu was a great warrior, but chose to accept Hammira's suzerainty. After leaving Abu, Hammira plundered Varddhanapura and Changa. He then proceeded to Pushkar via Ajmer. At Pushkar, he worshipped Adivaraha and then marched to Shakambhari. During this journey, he plundered multiple towns including Marhata, Khandilla, Chamda and Kankroli. He then returned to his capital, Ranthmabore.

Some days later, Hammira's spiritual guide Vishvarupa informed him that one could gain entry into heaven by performing the Koti-yajna sacrifice. Hammira performed this sacrifice in accordance with the shastras. He invited Brahmins from all over the country, and made generous donations to them. He also engaged in the month-long Munivrata observance.

=== Hammira's conflict with Ala-ud-Din Khalji ===
Meanwhile, Ala-ud-Din Khalji had ascended the throne of Delhi. In third year of Ala-ud-Din's reign, his Mongol (also called Mughal or Mudgal) noblemen rebelled against him, and were given asylum by Hammira in the Ranthambore Fort. These included Mahima Sahi or Mahimashahi (Indianized version of "Muhammad Shah").

He sent his younger brother Ullu Khan (Ulugh Khan) to sack Ranthambore, because unlike Jaitrasingh, Hammira did not pay any tribute to the Delhi Sultanate. Ullu Khan's army entered Hammira's territory, but could not march to Ranthambore because his cavalry could not cross the Varnanasha river. Ullu Khan encamped on the banks of the river, burning and destroying several nearby villages. Hammira was still engaged in the Munivrata observance, and therefore could not personally lead an army against Ullu Khan. He sent his generals Bhimasingh and Dharmasingh to counter the Delhi army. In the ensuing battle, Ullu Khan suffered a defeat, and lost several of his soldiers. When Bhimasingh started marching back to Ranthambore, Ullu Khan secretly followed him with a large army. Bhimasingh's soldiers had captured a large amount of wealth in the battle, and had marched ahead to carry it safely to Ranthambore. Bhimasingh was left with a small number of men. Ullu Khan attacked this small detachment, killed Bhimasingh, and then returned to Delhi.

In Ranthambore, Hammira had finished his sacrifice by the time he learned about Bhimasingh's death. He ordered Dharmasingh to be blinded and castrated for deserting Bhimasingh. Dharmasingh decided to avenge his humiliation, and befriended a courtesan named Radha Devi, who told him about all the happenings at the royal court. One day, Radha Devi told him that many of Hammira's horses had died of a disease. He communicated to the king through Radha Devi that he would present the king with many horses if restored to his former post. The king agreed, and Dharmasingh gradually gained his confidence by filling the royal treasury with wealth confiscated from the citizens. This made the citizens detest Hammira. The king's brother Bhoja tried to warn him against Dharmasingh's activities, but the king was very pleased with Dharmasingh's revenue generation, and entrusted full powers to Dharmasingh.

Dejected, Bhoja and his younger brother Pitama decided to leave the kingdom. They told Hammira that they were leaving for Varanasi. But after departing from Hammira's court, they went to Yoginipura (Delhi) and started serving Ala-ud-Din. At his instigation, Ala-ud-Din ordered Ullu Khan to invade Hammira's kingdom with a 100,000-horse cavalry. Hammira ordered his eight generals to attack the invading army from eight directions. The Delhi army was defeated and forced to flee the battlefield. After Hammira's victory celebrations were over, his Mongol chiefs sought his permission to punish Bhoja. The request was granted, and the Mongol chief Mahima Sahi raided Jagara, where he captured Pitama.

Ullu Khan and Bhoja implored Ala-ud-Din Khalji to punish Hammira. The Delhi Sultan then raised an army by seeking forces from other rulers. These included the kings of Anga, Telanga, Magadha, Maisur, Kalinga, Banga, Bhot, Medapata, Panchal, Bangal, Thamim, Bhilla, Nepal, Dahal and the Himalayan foothills. These kings agreed to contribute to Ala-ud-Din's campaign for different reasons, including their love for war, the prospect of plunder, or simply the desire to watch a battle.

Ala-ud-Din dispatched a massive army to Ranthambore, led by his brother Ullu Khan and Nusrat Khan. The army was so large that its horses drank up all the waters of rivers on the way. Ala-ud-Din himself stayed behind with a reserve force. After reaching a difficult mountain pass on the borders of the enemy territory, Ullu Khan advised Nusrat not to rely solely on a more powerful army. He made a plan to cross this mountain pass without being attacked. In accordance with this plan, Ullu and Nusrat sent Molhana Deva to negotiate a peace treaty with Hammira. While the negotiations were pending, Hammira's forces allowed the invading army to cross the mountain pass without being attacked. Hammira's camp believed that they had trapped their rivals into their territory, while the Delhi forces believed that they had managed to secure an advantageous position in the enemy territory.

Meanwhile, in Hammira's court, Molhana Deva told Hammira that he will to have accept one of the following conditions in order to conclude a peace treaty with Ala-ud-Din Khalji:

- Pay a tribute of 100,000 gold coins, 4 elephants and 300 horses. Marry Hammira's daughter to Ala-ud-Din.
- Surrender the four rebel Mongol chiefs to Ala-ud-Din.

A battle comparable to the Mahābhārata went on for two days such that it seemed that the sun had travelled to the far mountain [behind which the sun sets] in the west in order to speak to the horizon. In this battle 85,000 great, radiant Yavana warriors arrived in Yama-Loka.

— Hammira-Mahakavya

Hammira rejected the conditions, leading to a battle. Nusrat Khan was killed in this battle. Ullu Khan had to abandon the attack at the onset of the monsoon rains. He retreated to some distance from Ranthambore, and sent a message to Ala-ud-Din asking for help, along with Nusrat's dead body. Ala-ud-Din then himself led a force to Ranthambore, and besieged the fort. After two days of unsuccessfully trying to capture the fort, he sent a message to Hammira, praising the Chahamana king's bravery and promising to grant his any wish. Hammira replied that he wished to fight with Ala-ud-Din for two days. In the ensuing battle, the invading army lost around 85,000 men. Subsequently, both the parties agreed to a temporary ceasefire.

She [Dhara-devi] was paying attention to her breasts and bottom that seemed to be competing with each other in largeness. Her body which seemed to be made for pleasure like a slender vine was intoxicating […] With endearing sideways glances, which seemed to revive the lord of love, she penetrated the minds of the courtiers and made them exultant. The courtiers kept eyeing her up and down like a monkey climbing up and down a vine.

— Hammira-Mahakavya

During the truce, Hammira's courtesan Radha Devi (or Dhara-devi) performed a dance on a wall of the fort. She purposely turned her back towards Ala-ud-Din Khalji, who was encamped near the fort. Angry at her conduct, Ala-ud-Din asked for someone who could kill the dancer with an arrow. One of his subordinate chiefs told him that only a captive named Uddanasingh was capable of this. Ala-ud-Din ordered the release of Uddanasingh, who killed Radha Devi with an arrow. In response, Hammira's Mongol chief Mahima Sahi killed Uddanasingh with same arrow.

=== Hammira's defeat and death ===
Mahima Sahi's feat of archery greatly intimidated Ala-ud-Din, who moved his camp from the eastern side of the fort to the safer western side. When this happened, the Chahamanas realized that Ala-ud-Din's soldiers had been constructing a tunnel to the fort. They used cannon fire to kill these underground workers and destroy their work. Ala-ud-Din faced further trouble, when a group of rams ransacked his camp. Frustrated, Ala-ud-Din asked Hammira to send the Chahamana general Ratipala to conclude a peace treaty. Hammira sent Ratipala to hear Ala-ud-Din's offer, but this irked another Chahamana general Ranamalla, who was unhappy about not being chosen to visit Ala-ud-Din.

When Ratipala came to Ala-ud-Din's camp, he was received with great honour. The Delhi Sultan presented him gifts, took him to his harem, and let him eat and drink in private with the Sultan's sister. Ala-ud-Din then promised to make Ratipala the governor of Ranthambore in return for his help in conquering the fort. Ratnapala agreed to Ala-ud-Din's proposal to betray Hammira. Upon returning to the fort, he greatly exaggerated the strength of Ala-ud-Din's army. He then told Hammira that Ranamalla was angry with the king, and recommended that Hammira talk to him in the private to ensure his support against Ala-ud-Din. Next, Ratipala approached Ranamalla, and told him that Hammira was angry with him, and planned to imprison him that night. Ratipala advised Ranamalla to escape the fort and seek shelter with Ala-ud-Din. Ratipala also spread a rumor among the queens that Ala-ud-Din's only condition for peace was marrying Hammira's daughter Devall-devi. Hammira's queens convinced his daughter to agree to the marriage, but Hammira rejected this proposal.

Hammira's brother Virama warned the king that Ratipala seemed drunk, and therefore, should not be believed. Virama recommended that the king order Ratipala's killing, but Hammira dismissed his concerns. Hammira argued that the fort was strong enough to resist the enemy attack, and expressed concern that if Ratipala was innocent, his killing would demoralize others. Hammira then decided to visit Ranamalla to seek his support, as advised by Ratipala. When Ranamalla heard about the king's visit, he thought that the king was coming to imprison him. He and his men left immediately, and sought shelter with Ala-ud-Din. Soon after, Ratipala also joined him.

Hammira now decided to prepare for a battle. He asked his Kothari (store-keeper) about the status of the fort's granary. The granary had run out of foodgrains. But the Kothari, fearing for his job, told the king that there were enough foodgrains for a prolonged siege. Nevertheless, the king soon learned the truth, and ordered the killing of the Kothari. Disturbed by the events of the day, especially the betrayals by his own men, Hammira could not sleep at night.

The next day, Hammira's men prepared for a final war, determined to fight to death. Hammira offered his loyal Mongol chief Mahima Sahi the option to leave, as he did not want a foreigner dying for him. But Mahima Sahi readied for the battle, and killed all the female members of his family. Hammira's queens (including Ranga Devi or Arangi-devi) and daughters (including Devall-devi), also killed themselves by self-immolation to avoid being captured by the enemy soldiers.

After performing a funeral ceremony for the deceased, Hammira and his loyal men attacked Ala-ud-Din's camp. A deadly battle ensued, in which Hammira's loyal generals died one by one: Virama, Mahima Sahi, Jaja, Gangadhar Tak, and Kshetrasingh Paramara. Finally, Hammira also fell, pierced by a hundred arrows. He then slit his own throat to avoid capture. This event happened during the 18th year of his reign, in the Shravana month.

== Historical reliability ==
Hammira Mahakavya does not provide a satisfactorily correct genealogy of the Chahamana kings. Nilkanth Janardan Kirtane, who translated the text into English in 1899, dismisses the text's description of the early Chahamana kings as "filled with fanciful conceptions", aimed at providing the author an opportunity to showcase "his power for poetical conceits." According to him, the text is "fairly historic" in its description of the kings from Prithviraja III to Hammira, but even in this portion, the author sometimes "relapses into rhapsody which amounts to a confession of his ignorance of the historical facts."

Historian Asoke Kumar Majumdar agrees with Kirtane's assessment, and describes certain parts of the text as "very unreliable", specifically the portion which claims that Vigraharaja II killed Mularaja and conquered Gujarat.

Historian R. B. Singh of Gorakhpur University notes that as a source for the history of the Chahamanas, Hammira Mahakavya is less reliable than Prithviraja Vijaya, as the former was composed two centuries later. Historian Kalika Ranjan Kanungo describes Hammira Mahakavya as well as the later text Hammira Raso as pseudo-historical poems. Aziz Ahmed (1963) describes it an unhistorical text that contains fantastical details. Muni Jinavijaya (1968) presents the text as a "national poem", portraying Hammira as an Indian hero who fought against a foreign Muslim ruler.

== See also ==
- Alauddin Khalji's conquest of Ranthambore
