= Vigraharaja =

Vigraharaja may refer to any of the following Indian kings from the Shakambhari Chahamana dynasty:

- Vigraharaja I (r. r. c. 734-759 CE)
- Vigraharaja II (r. c. 971-998 CE)
- Vigraharaja III (r. c. 1070-1090 CE)
- Vigraharaja IV (r. c. 1150-1164 CE)
