= Bijolia Parshvanath temple =

Jain temple in Bhilwara, Rajasthan

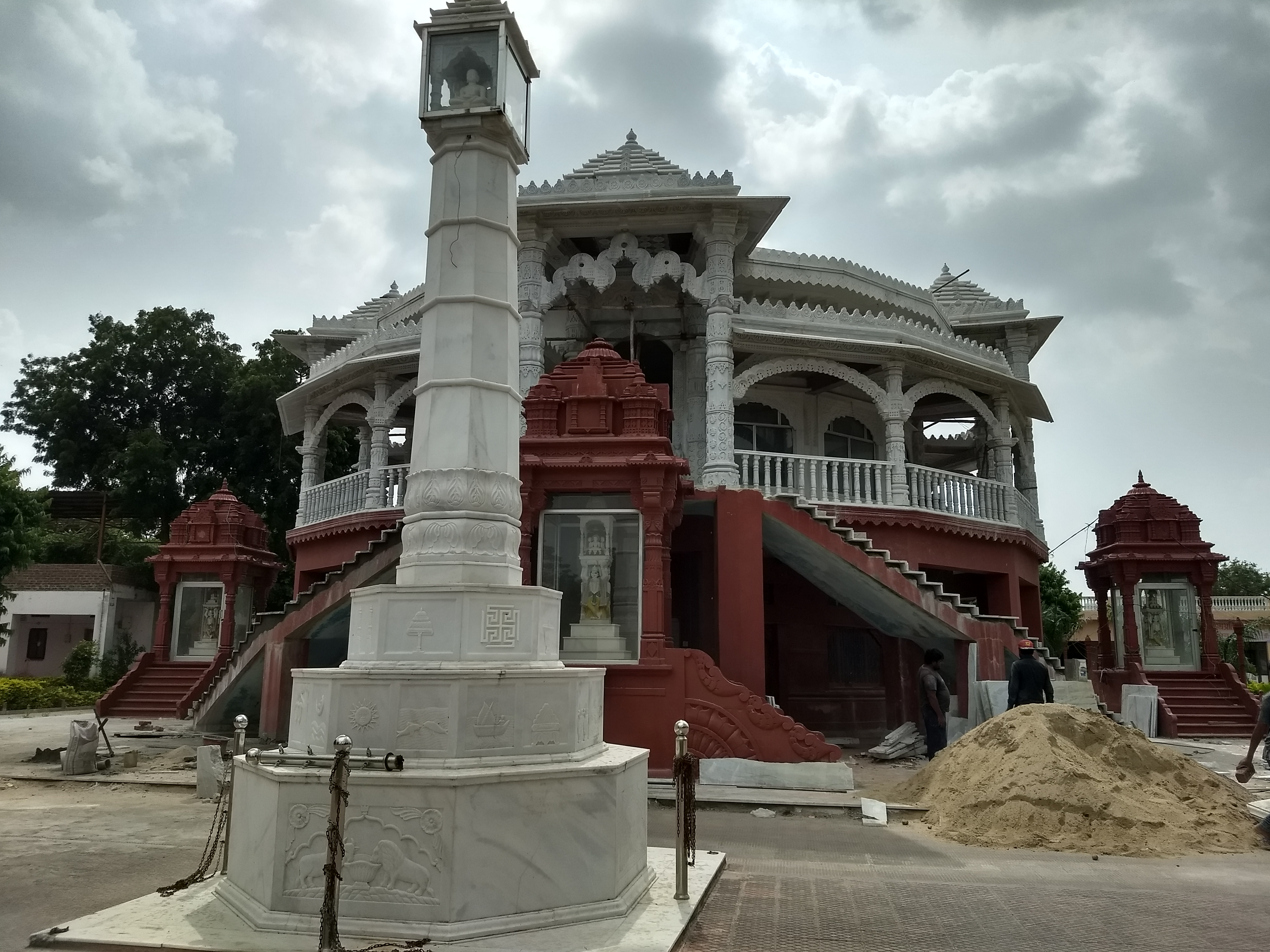
- Shri Digambar Jain Parshwanath Atishay Kshetra

- Location within Rajasthan

Religion
- Affiliation: Jainism
- Sect: Digambara
- Deity: Parshvanatha
- Festival: Mahavir Jayanti
- Governing body: Shri Digambar Jain Parshwanath Atishay Kshetra Committee

Location
- Location: Bijolia, Rajasthan
- Coordinates: 25°08′59.3″N 75°20′15″E

Architecture
- Creator: Mahajan Lala
- Established: 12th century
- Temple: 11

Bijolia Parshvanath Temple or Tapodaya Teerth Kshetra is a Jain pilgrimage center located in Bijolia town in Bhilwara district of Rajasthan.

== History ==
Bijolia is famous for two rock inscriptions, both dated 1170 CE (V. S. 1226). One inscription provides the genealogy of the Chahamanas of Shakambhari and the second is a Jaina poem called Uttama Sikhara Purana. The first inscription opens with salutation to Parshvanatha and records coronation of Somesvara. The third verse of inscription describes how Someshvara gave the grant to build Parshvanatha temple in Rewna village. The latter inscription, engraved near the door of the Parsvanatha temple, records the homage of Manoratha, son of Mahidhara. According to Jain tradition, this place is believed to be where the Uttama Sikhara Purana was composed.

According to Peter Flügel, the Undeshvar Shiva temple of Bijolia was originally a Śvētāmbara temple based on carvings of prominent Jain figures in the temple exterior.

== About temple ==
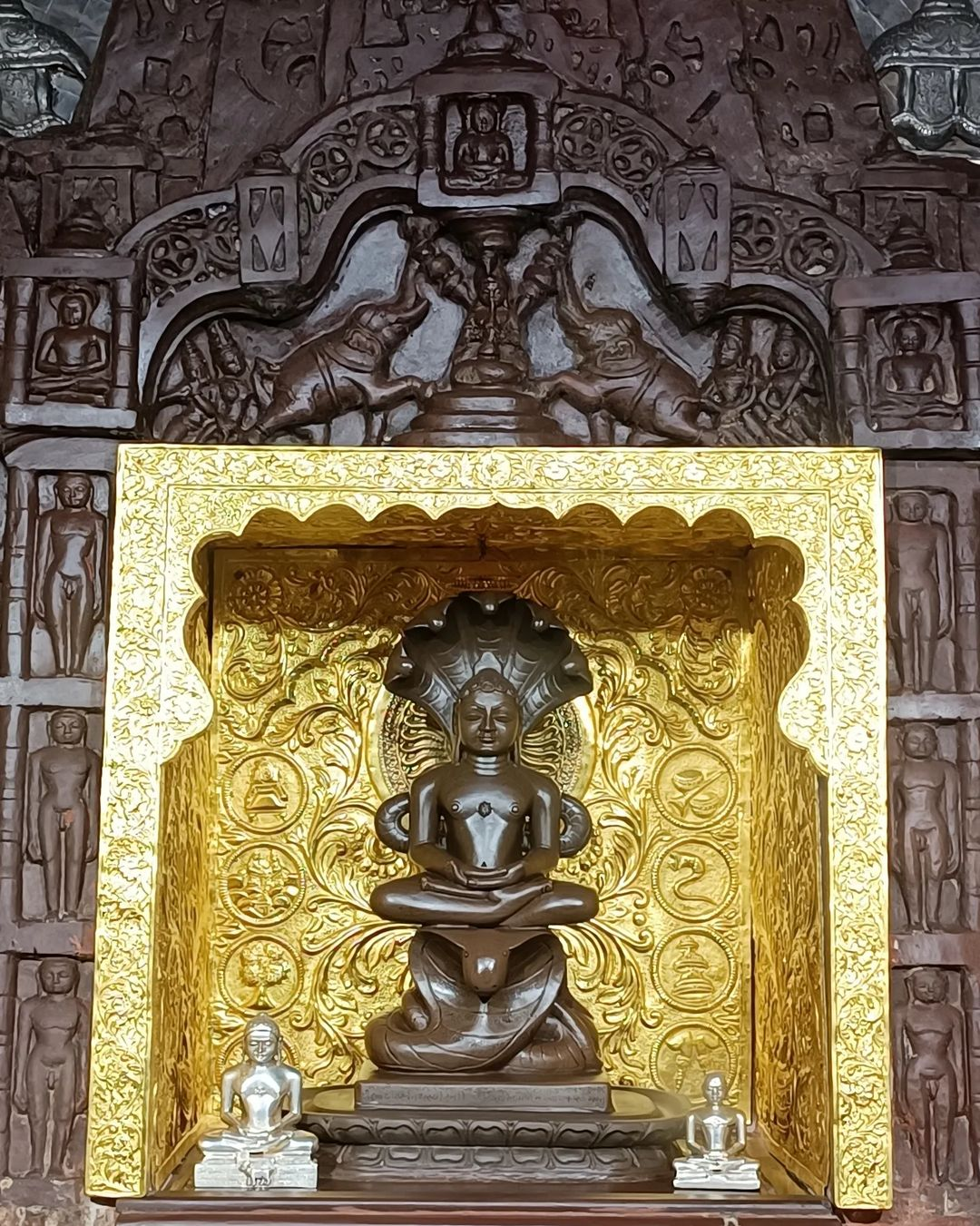
Main vedi

Five Jain temples was constructed in 1160 CE by Mahajan Lala during the reign of King Somesvara of Chahamanas empire. The main temple is a large structure consisting of a small model of the temple. The temple is dedicated to Parshvanatha and is a major Jain pilgrimage center. The historic Jain temple group is associated with a Panchayatana arrangement, consisting of a principal shrine with four subsidiary shrines. A kund (water reservoir) also forms part of the religious complex.

The medieval Jain monuments form part of a larger architectural landscape at Bijolia that also includes the Mahakal, Hazareshwar and Undeshwar temples and the Mandakini reservoir.

== Inscriptions ==
The two inscriptions dated V.S. 1226 (1170 CE) are important sources for the political and religious history of medieval Bijolia. The first records the Chahamana genealogy through Someshvara and refers to religious establishments at Vindhyavali and neighbouring settlements. The second, associated with the Jain Uttama Sikhara Purana, is engraved near the doorway of the Parshvanatha temple. The rock inscription within the Parshvanath temple compound is recognised as a Monument of National Importance and is protected by the Archaeological Survey of India.

The protected inscription is officially identified as the "Rock Inscription within the Parasvanath Temple compound (12th Cent. AD)".

== Religious significance ==
The combination of Jain temples, sculptures and inscriptions indicates the importance of Bijolia as a medieval centre of Jain religious activity. The 1170 CE inscriptions are particularly significant because they connect the Jain establishment with the political history of the Chahamanas and with contemporary literary activity. The presence of Jain imagery at the nearby Undeshwar Temple has also led scholars to examine the extent of Jain architectural activity beyond the surviving Parshvanatha temple complex.

== Protection ==
The twelfth-century rock inscription within the Parshvanath temple compound is under the protection of the Archaeological Survey of India. A second twelfth-century rock inscription at Bijolia and the Mahakal group of temples are also included among the centrally protected monuments at Bijolia.

== Gallery ==
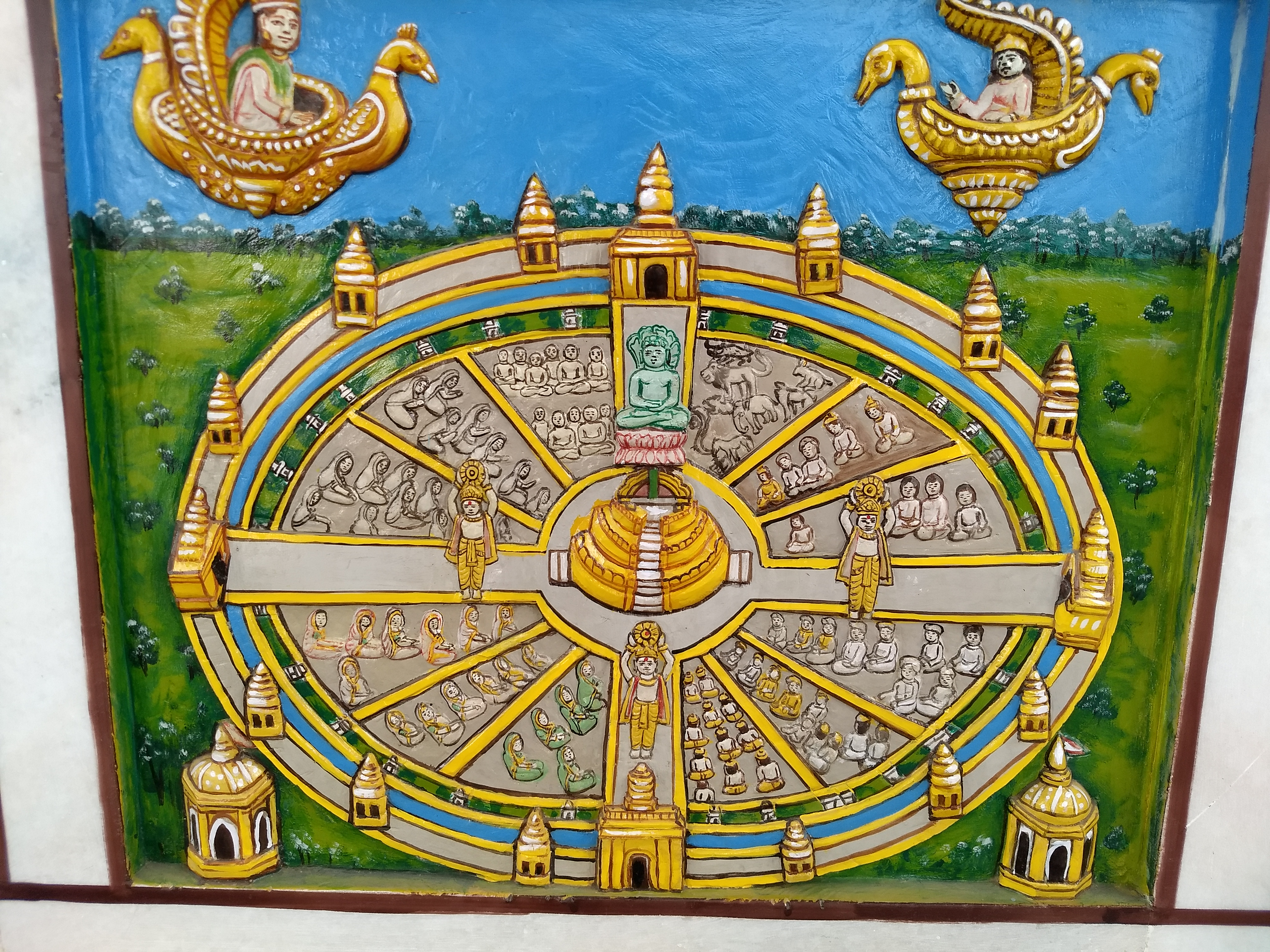
Samavasarana mural

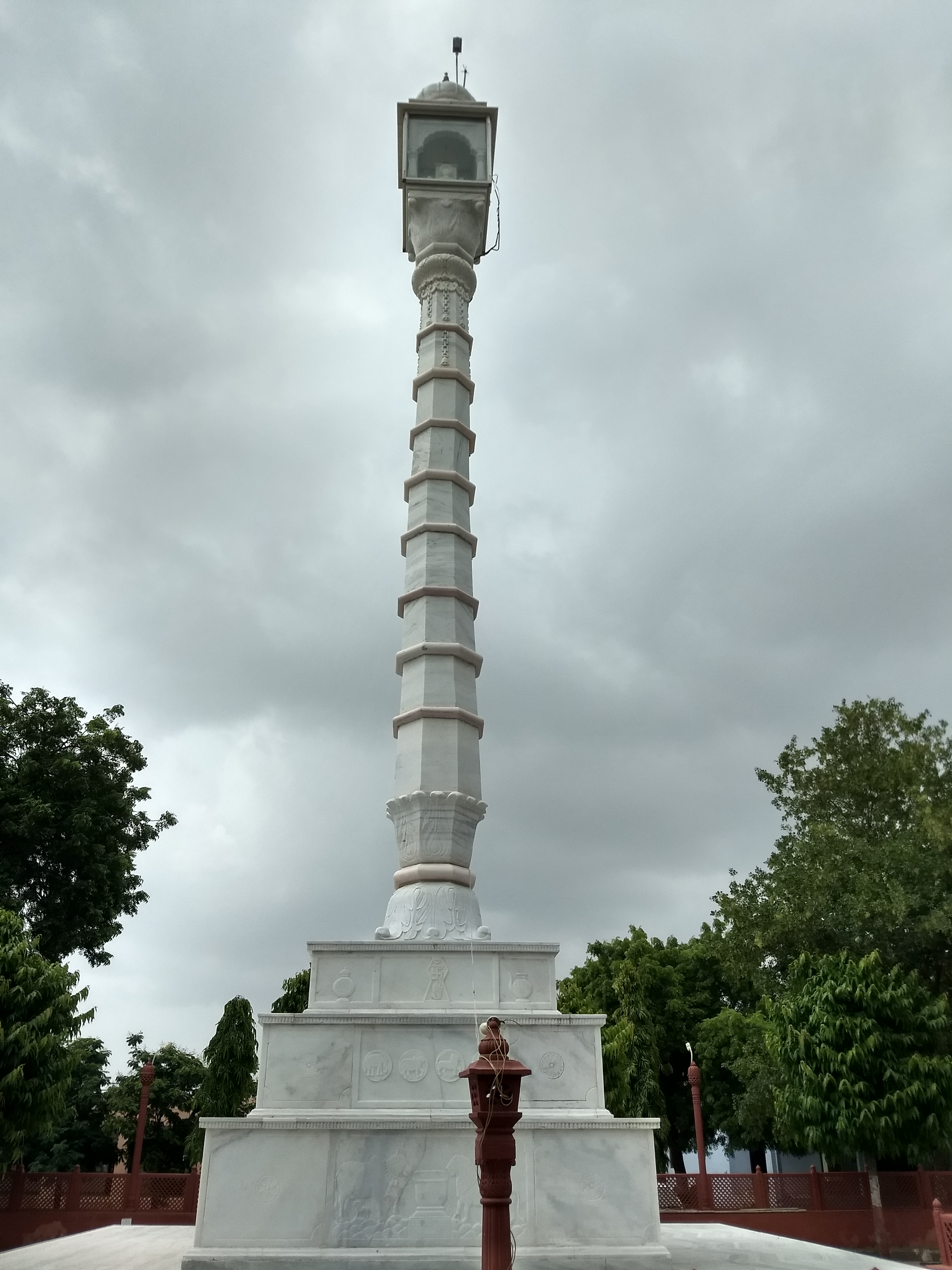
Manasthambha

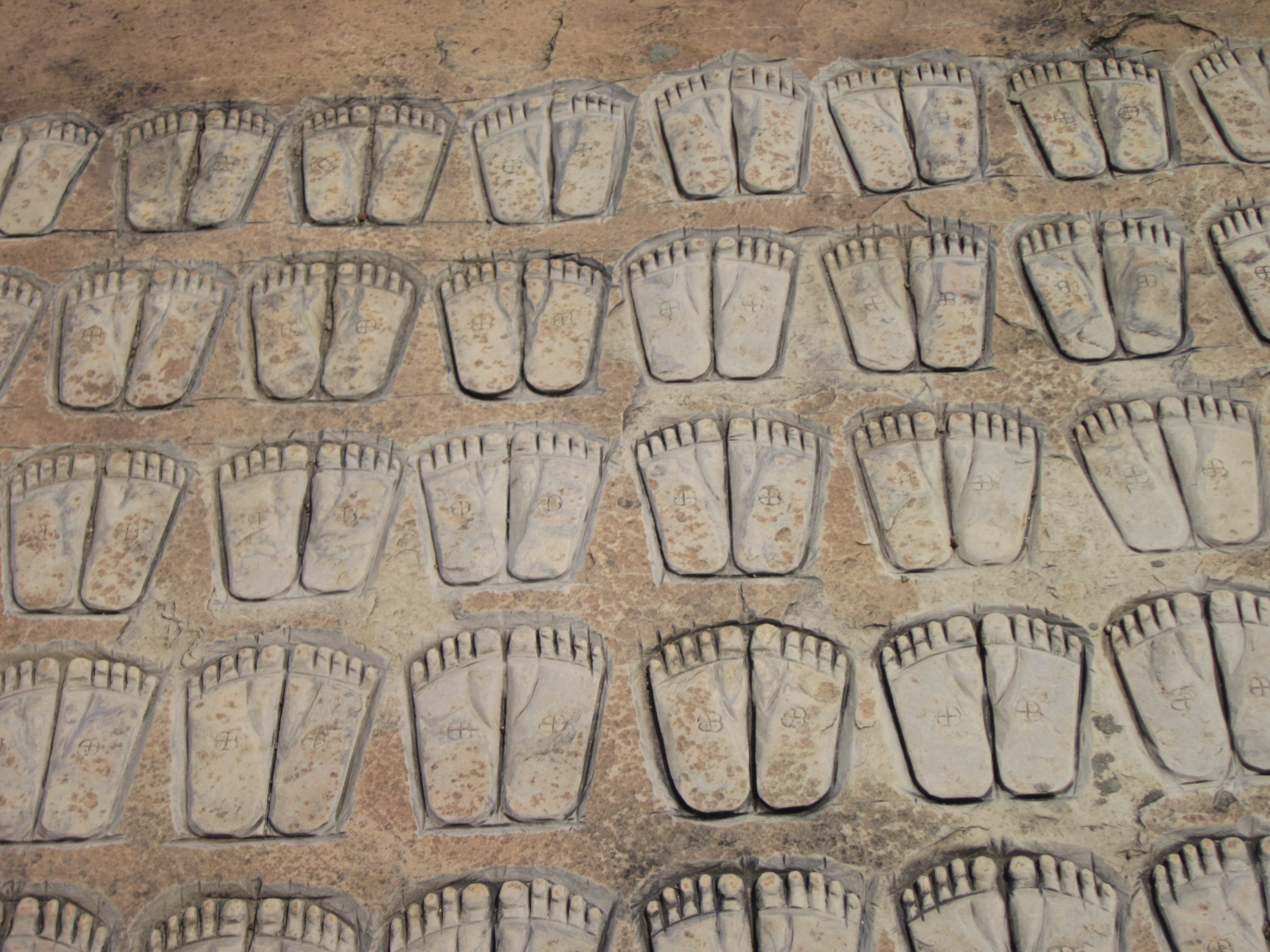
Footprints near temple

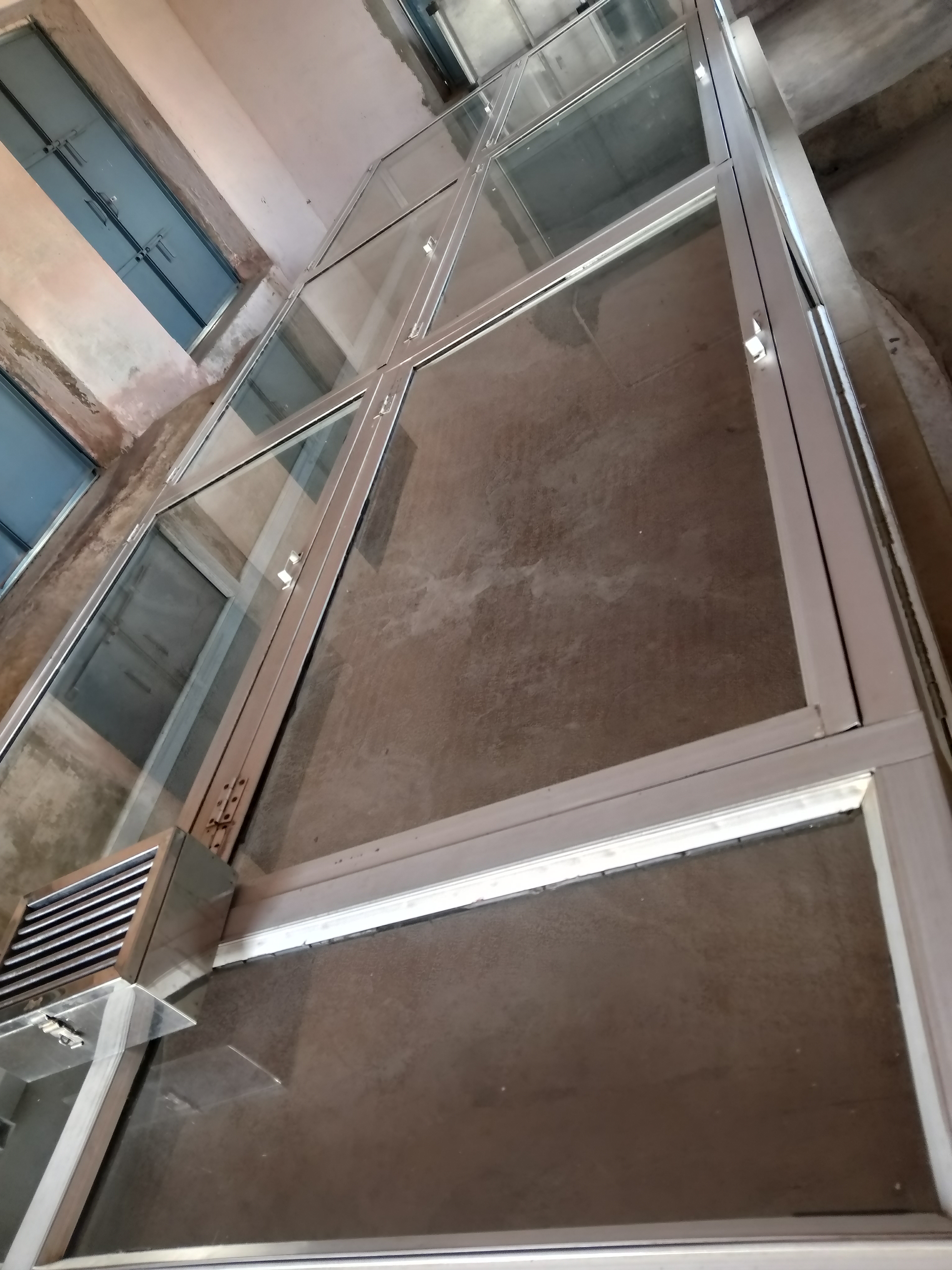
Bijoliya Inscription of V.S. 1226

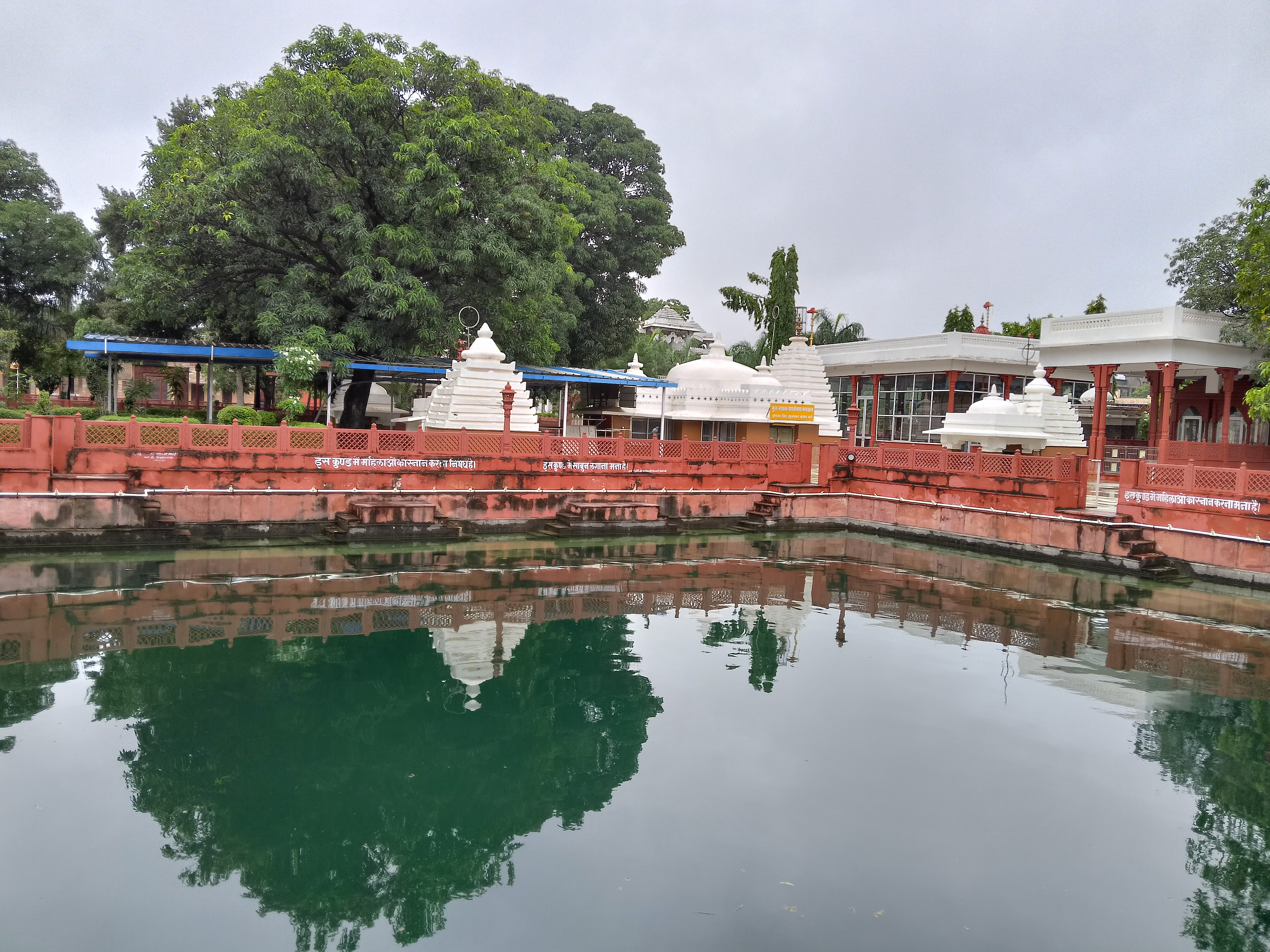
Bijoliya Temple Complex

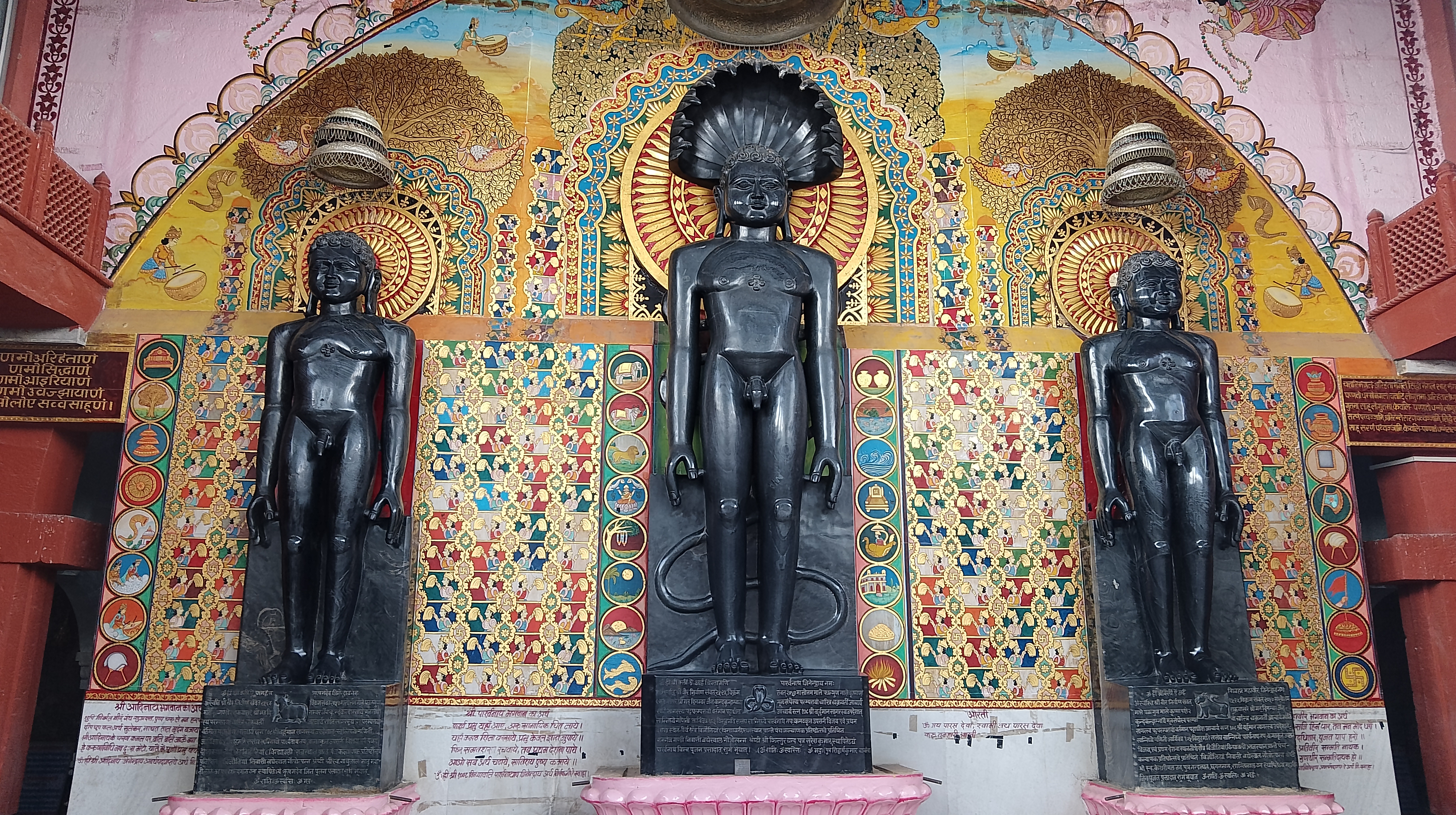
Newly Made temple in Bijoliya

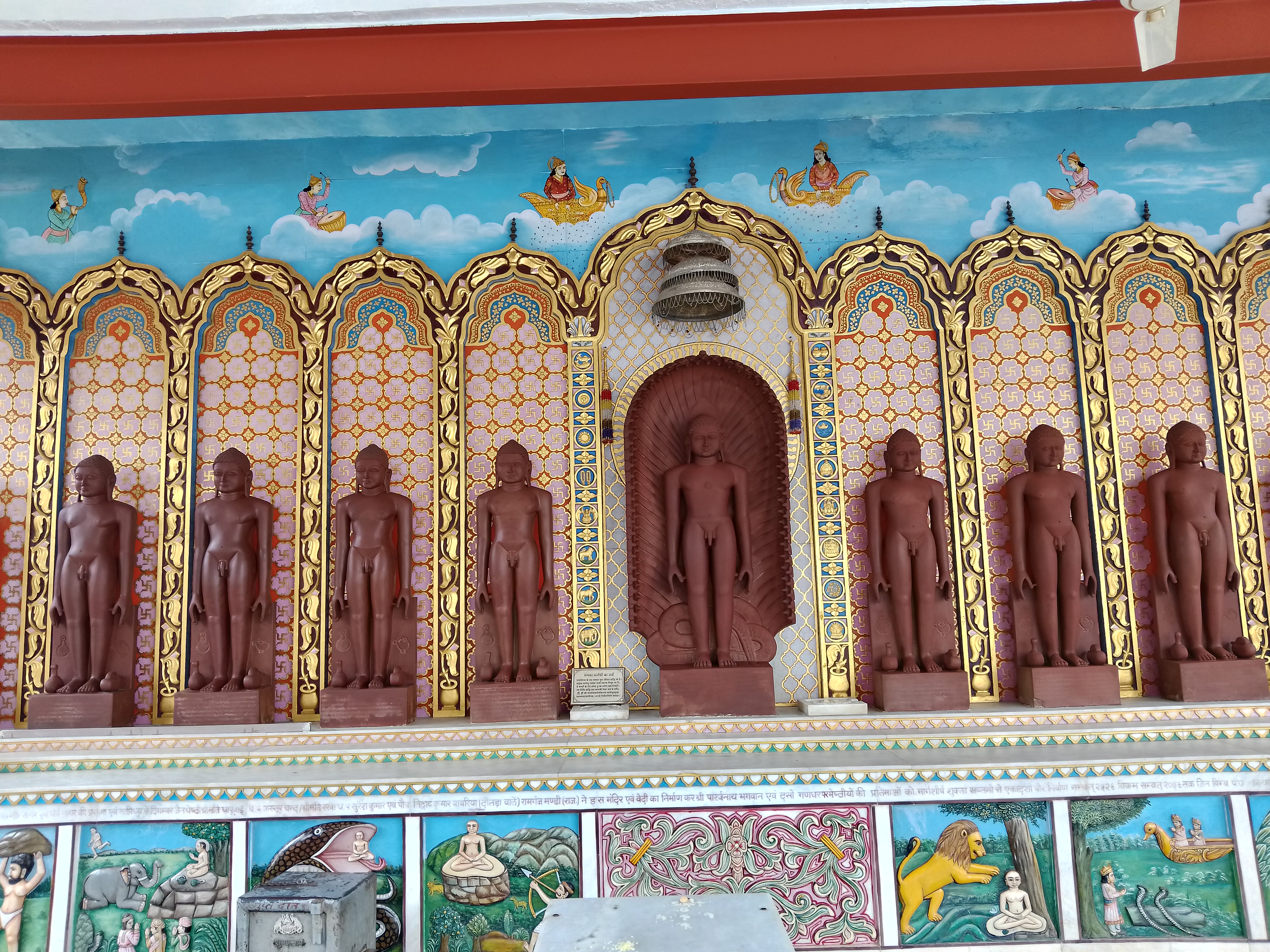
Temple Dedicated to Gandhars of Lord Parshvnath

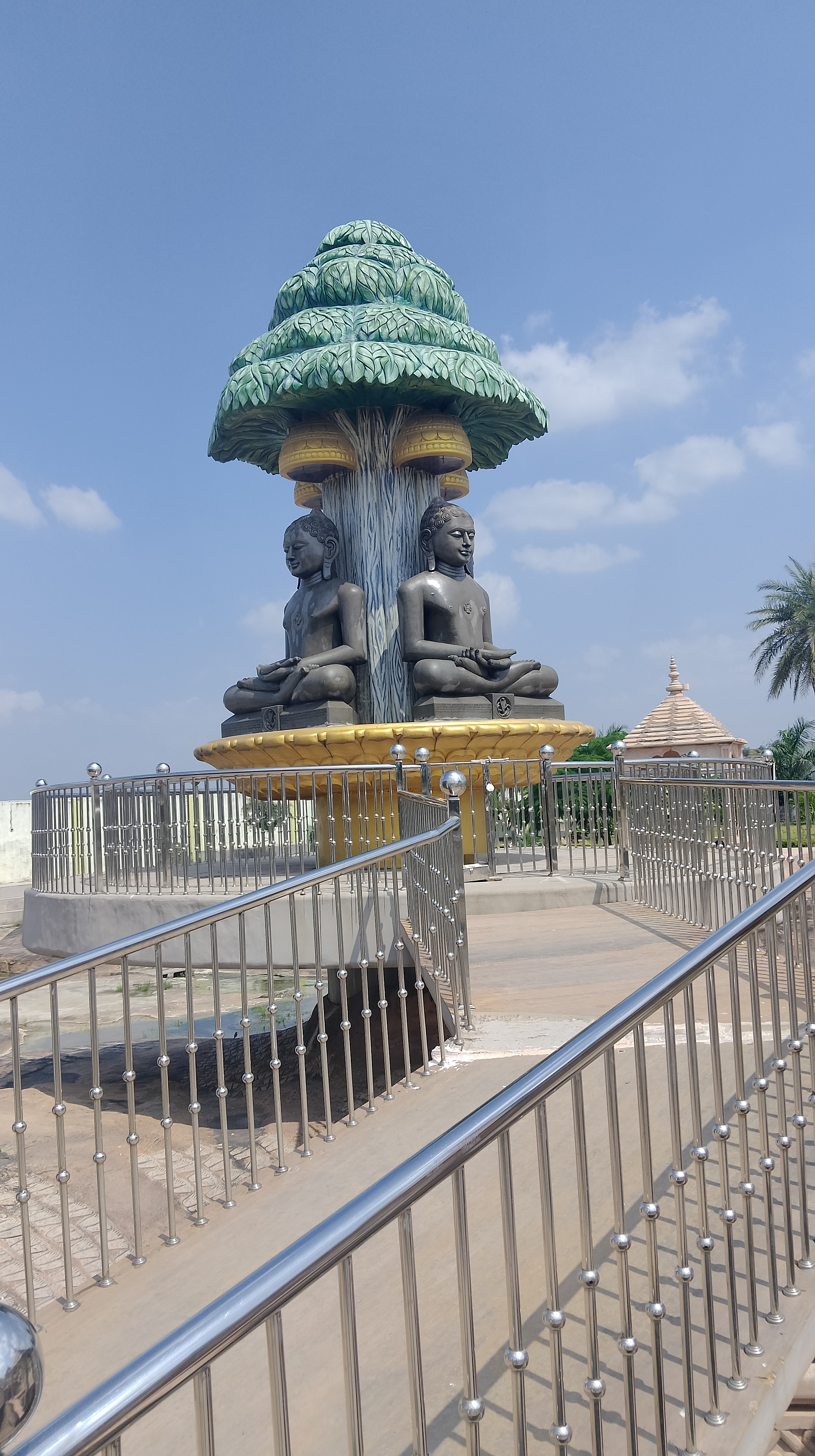
Chaturmukh Jaina Idols

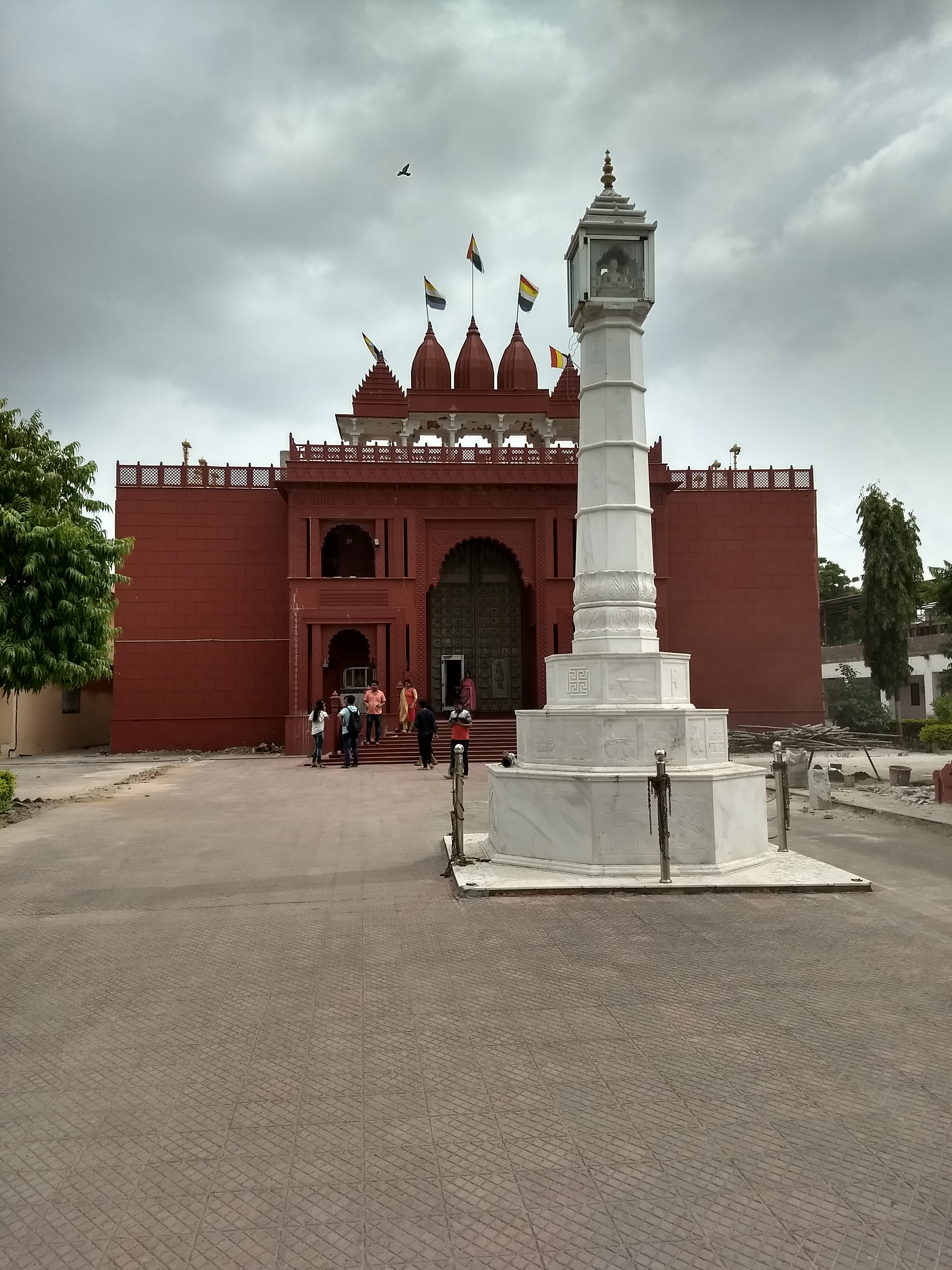
Outer View of New Temple

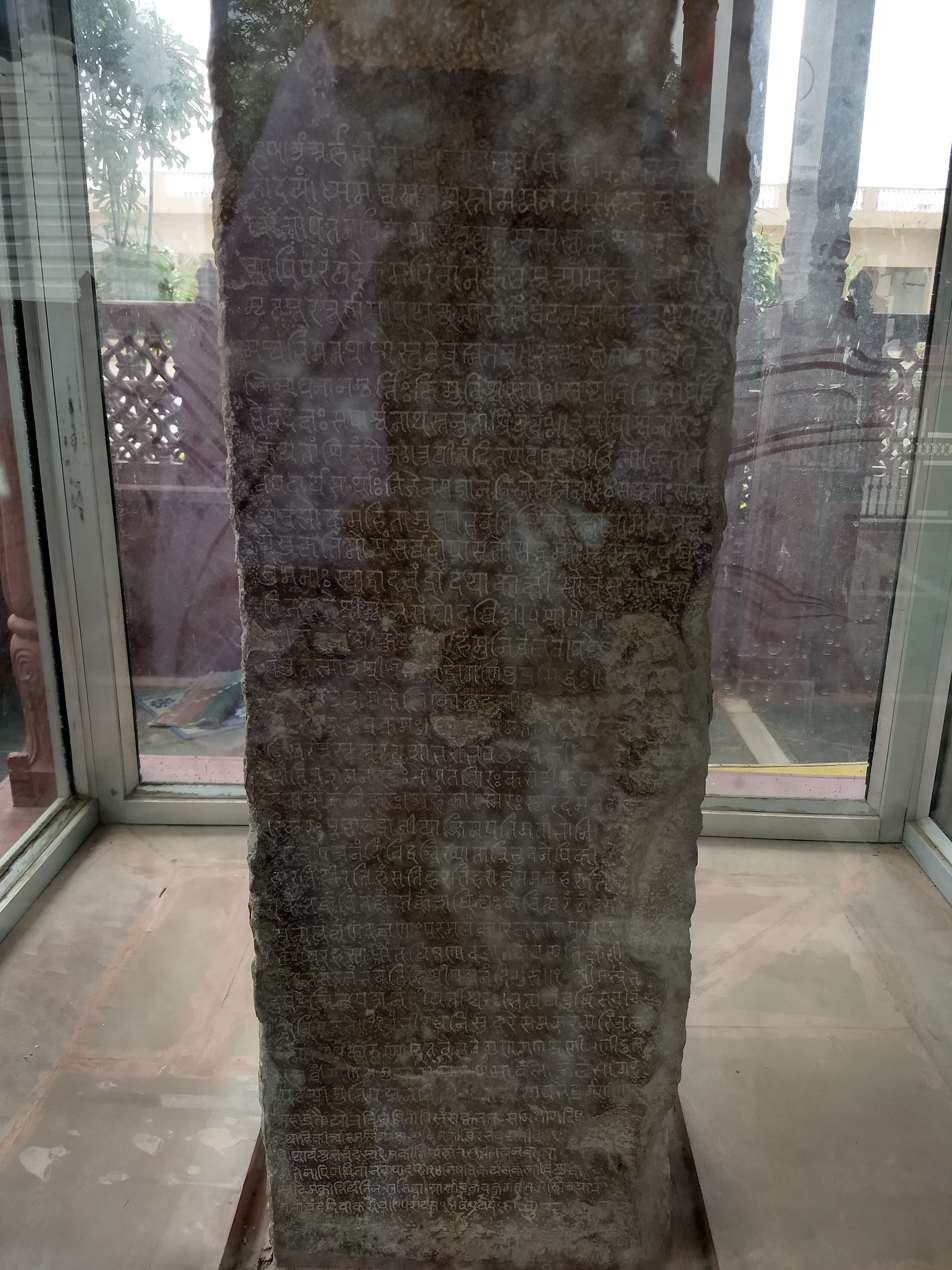
Inscription on the Bhattarak Nishidikas

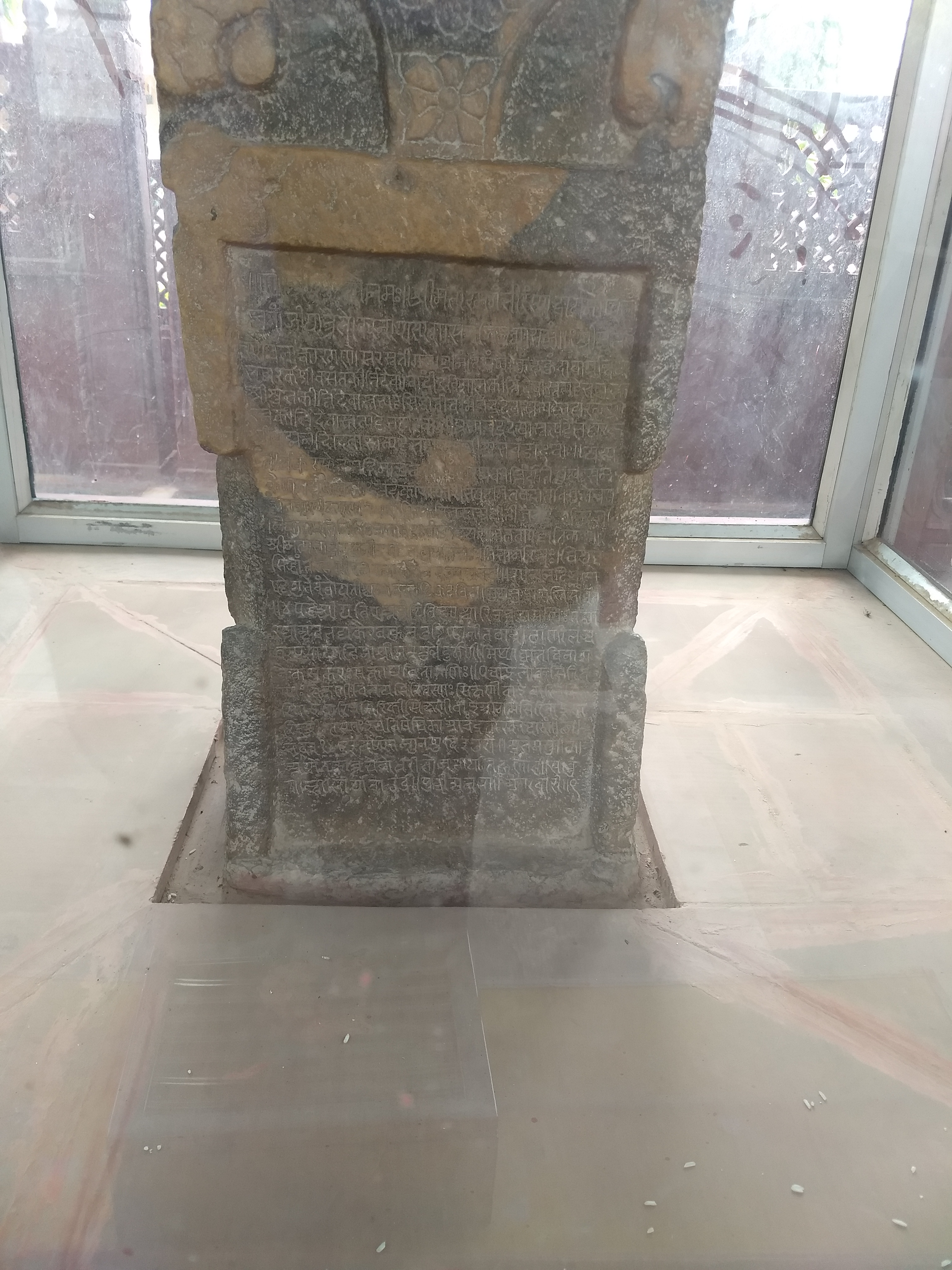
Inscription on Bhattarak Nishidi

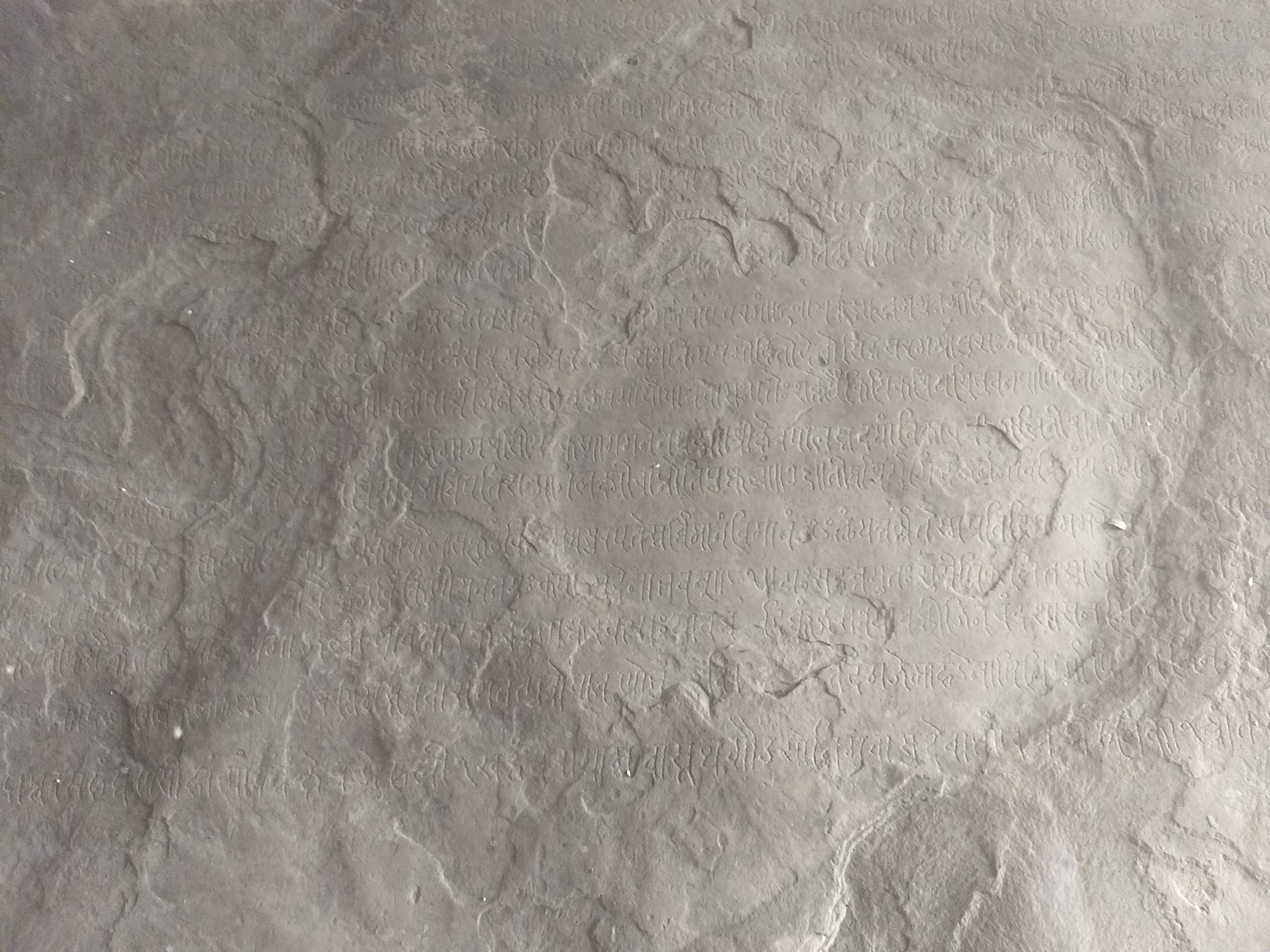
Bijolia inscription

== See also ==
- Ahichchhatra Jain temples
