= Chamundaraja (Chahamana dynasty) =

King of Sapadalaksha
- Reign: c. 1045–1065 CE
- Predecessor: Viryarama
- Successor: Durlabharaja III
- Issue: Durlabharaja III; Vigraharaja III
- Dynasty: Chahamanas of Shakambhari

Chamundaraja (r. c. 1045–1065 CE) was an Indian king belonging to the Shakambhari Chahamana dynasty. He ruled the Sapadalaksha country, which included parts of present-day Rajasthan in north-western India.

Chamundaraja succeeded Viryarama, who had succeeded Vakpatiraja II. According to historian R. B. Singh, Virayarama and Chamundaraja were sons of Vakpatiraja. According to Dasharatha Sharma, all three were sons of Govindaraja III.

== Rise to power ==
Chamundaraja's predecessor Viryarama had been killed by the Paramara king Bhoja. It is possible that the Paramaras occupied Shakambhari for a brief period. According to historian Dasharatha Sharma, Chamundaraja would have evicted them with support from the Naddula Chahamana ruler Anahilla. The Sundha inscription of the Naddula Chahamanas claims that Anahilla killed Bhoja's general Sadha, and recaptured Shakambhari and established himself as the next monarch of his dynasty.

== War with the Ghaznavids ==
Chamundaraja appears to have defeated a Muslim army, as suggested by multiple texts including Prabandha Kosha, Hammira Mahakavya and Surjana Charita. The Prabandha Kosha describes him as "the slayer of the Sultan", while the Hammira Mahakavya states that he defeated one "Hejim-ud-Din". The Chahamana kingdom bordered the Ghaznavid Empire, and it is possible that Chamundaraja foiled a Ghaznavid invasion. No Ghaznavid Sultan after Mawdud of Ghazni is known to have personally led an army to India; it is possible that the "Sultan" slayed by Chamundaraja was a Ghaznavid general.

According to Prithviraja Vijaya, Chamundaraja commissioned a Vishnu temple at Narapura (modern Narwar in Ajmer district).

== Succession ==
Chamundaraja was succeeded by his son Durlabharaja III, who was succeeded by his other son Vigraharaja III. The Bijolia inscription places one Simhata between the Chamundaraja and Durlabharaja III. According to Dasharatha Sharma, Simhata could have been an elder brother of Durlabharaja III.
