= Samantaraja =

King of Sapadalaksha
- Reign: c. 668–709 CE
- Predecessor: Vasudeva
- Successor: Naradeva
- Dynasty: Chahamanas of Shakambhari

Samantaraja (IAST: Sāmantarāja, r. c. 7th century CE) was an Indian king belonging to the Chahamana dynasty of Shakambhari (modern Sambhar). He ruled parts of present-day Rajasthan in north-western India.

The exact period of Samanta is not certain. According to Dasharatha Sharma, his reign ended around 725 VS (c. 668 CE). On the other hand, Historian R. B. Singh assigned Samanta's reign to the period c. 684-709 CE and identifies Manik Rai as Samantaraja, the 7th century Chahamana ruler of Shakambhari.

The 1170 CE Bijolia rock inscription of his descendant Someshvara states that Samanta was born at Ahichchhatrapura in the gotra of sage Vatsa. Ahichchhatrapura is identified with modern Nagaur.

Vasudeva, an ancestor of Samanta, is known from the historical records, but the relationship between the two is not certain. Historian R. B. Singh theorizes that after Vasudeva, the Chahamanas were overshadowed by the Vardhanas, and Samanta restored the Chahamana rule at Shakambhari. The medieval bardic legends state that Manik Rai restored the fortunes of the Chauhan (Chahamana) family by the grace of the goddess Shakambhari. Singh identifies Manik Rai as Samanta.

Samanta was succeeded by Naradeva.
