= Durlabharaja III =

11th-century Indian king

King of Sapadalaksha
- Reign: c. 1065–1070 CE
- Predecessor: Chamundaraja
- Successor: Vigraharaja III
- Dynasty: Chahamanas of Shakambhari
- Father: Chamundaraja

Durlabharaja III (r. c. 1065–1070 CE) was an Indian king belonging to the Shakambhari Chahamana dynasty. He ruled the Sapadalaksha country, which included parts of present-day Rajasthan in north-western India.

== Early life ==
Durlabha-raja III, also known as Duśala, succeeded his father Chamundaraja on the Chahamana throne. The Bijolia inscription places one Simhata between the two. Historian Dasharatha Sharma theorizes that Simhata could have been an elder brother of Durlabharaja.

== Conflict with the Gujarat Chaulukyas ==
Two relatively late texts suggest that Durlabharaja was involved in a conflict with Karna, the Chaulukya king of Gujarat. The Prabandha Kosha claims that Durlabha defeated the Gurjara king, brought him to Ajmer in chains and forced him to sell yogurt in a market. The Hammira Mahakavya claims that Karna died in a battle against Durlabha, and lost all his wealth to the Chahamana king. This is known to be historically incorrect, because Karna (died c. 1092 CE) continued to rule after Durlabha's death. Moreover, the earlier and more reliable texts such as Prithviraja Vijaya do not mention any such conflict. It is possible that Durlabha achieved a minor military success against Karna, which was magnified into a major victory by the later panegyrists.

== Death ==
Durlabha seems to have faced Muslim invasions, most probably from the Ghaznavids, whose king was Ibrahim. The Prithviraja Vijaya states that he was killed in a battle with the Mātangas. According to Jonaraja's commentary on the text, the word "Mātanga" refers to mlechchhas, that is, Muslims. Hammira Mahakavya, written several years later, claims that Durlabha captured a Muslim ruler named Shahab-ud-Din, but this does not seem to be historically accurate.

Durlabharaja III was succeeded by his brother Vigraharaja III.
