= Viryarama =

King of Sapadalaksha
- Reign: c. 1040 CE
- Predecessor: Vakpatiraja II
- Successor: Chamundaraja
- Dynasty: Chahamanas of Shakambhari

Viryarama (r. c. 1040 CE) was an Indian king belonging to the Shakambhari Chahamana dynasty. He ruled the Sapadalaksha region, which included parts of present-day Rajasthan in north-western India.

Viryarama succeeded Vakpatiraja II as the Chahamana king, and was succeeded by Chamundaraja after a very short reign. According to historian R. B. Singh, Virayarama and Chamundaraja were both sons of Vakpatiraja. Dasharatha Sharma, however, considers all three as sons of Govindaraja III.

According to Prithviraja Vijaya, Viryarama was killed by the Paramara king Bhoja. The Sundha inscription of the Naddula Chahamanas claims that their king Anahilla killed Bhoja's general Sadha, and captured Shakambhari. Historian Dasharatha Sharma theorizes that the Paramaras occupied Shakambhari after Viryarama's death, and were evicted by his successor Chamundaraja with help of Anahilla. On the other hand, R. B. Singh speculates that Anahilla and Bhoja formed an alliance against Viryarama; sometime later, the alliance broke, and Anahilla killed Bhoja's general Sadha.
