= Vasudeva (Chahamana dynasty) =

King of Sapadalaksha
- Reign: 551 CE – 684 CE
- Successor: Samantaraja
- Dynasty: Chahamanas of Shakambhari

Vasudeva (c. 6th century CE) was an Indian king belonging to the Chahamana dynasty of Shakambhari (modern Sambhar). He ruled the Sapadalaksha Region in present-day Rajasthan.

Ignoring Chahamana, the mythical founder of the dynasty, Vasudeva is the earliest known ruler of the dynasty. According to the Prabandha-Kosha of the 14th century Jain scholar Rajashekhara Suri, Vasudeva ascended the throne in 551 CE (608 Vikram Samvat). The historical accuracy of this statement is not certain. According to Chandrashekhar's Surjan-charit, Vasudev Chauhan defeated the Huns and established his kingdom.

A mythical account in Prithviraja Vijaya states that Vasudeva received the Sambhar Salt Lake as a gift from a vidyadhara (a supernatural being). According to this legend, Vasudeva once found a vidyadhara sleeping in the royal bed. A magic pill which gave the vidyadhara the power to fly had fallen from his mouth. Vasudeva handed over this magic pill to the vidyadhara. The grateful vidyadhara introduced himself as the son of Shakambhara. He told Vasudeva that the goddess Parvati, pleased with Shakambhara's devotion, had been residing in the local forest under the name "Shakambhari". The vidyadhara decided to return the favour to Vasudeva. He asked the king to put his sword in the ground at sunset, and ride a horse back to his capital without looking back. The king did as told, and waves of water followed him. The resulting body of water became the salt lake of Sambhar. The vidyadhara appeared before the king, and told him that the lake would remain in the possession of his descendants. The Bijolia inscription of his descendant Someshvara states that the lake was born of Vasudeva.

The next known Chahamana king is Samantaraja, whose relationship to Vasudeva is not clear from the available historical records.
