= Vakpatiraja II =

King of Sapadalaksha
- Reign: c. 1026–1040 CE
- Predecessor: Govindaraja III
- Successor: Viryarama
- Dynasty: Chahamanas of Shakambhari
- Father: Govindaraja III

Vakpatiraja II (r. c. 1026–1040 CE) was an Indian king belonging to the Shakambhari Chahamana dynasty. He ruled the Sapadalaksha country, which included parts of present-day Rajasthan in north-western India.

Vakpati succeeded his father Govindaraja III as the Chahamana king. The Prabandha-Kosha calls him "Vallabha".

According to Prithviraja Vijaya, Vakpati defeated and killed Ambaprasada, the ruler of Aghata (identified with modern Ahar). Historian R. B. Singh identifies Ambaprasada with the Guhila ruler Amaraprasada.

Later texts such as Surjana-Charita, Hammira-Kavya and Prabandha-Kosha claim that Vakpati defeated Bhoja, the Paramara king of Malwa. These sources provide also provide some fictitious details about the supposed conflict. However, this claim is not reliable.

Vakpati was succeeded by his son Viryarama, who was killed by Bhoja. Subsequently, Chamundaraja ascended the Chahamana throne. According to historian R. B. Singh, Virayarama and Chamundaraja were sons of Vakpati. Dasharatha Sharma, however, considers all three as sons of Govindaraja III.
