= Prithviraja I =

- Parama-bhattaraka Maharajadhiraja Parameshvara

King of Sapadalaksha
- Reign: c. 1090–1110 CE
- Predecessor: Vigraharaja III
- Successor: Ajayaraja II
- Dynasty: Chahamanas of Shakambhari
- Father: Vigraharaja III

Prithvirāja I (r. c. 1090–1110 CE) was an Indian king belonging to the Shakambhari Chahamana dynasty. He ruled the Sapadalaksha country, which included parts of present-day Rajasthan in north-western India.

== Early life ==
Prithviraja succeeded his father Vigraharaja III on the Chahamana throne. The 1105 CE Jinamata inscription gives his title as Parama-bhattaraka Maharajadhiraja Parameshvara, which indicates that he was a powerful king.

== Military successes ==
The Prithviraja Vijaya claims that a band of 700 Chaulukyas came to Pushkara Tirtha to rob the Brahmins during the reign of Prithviraja I. The Chahamana king defeated and killed them. This legend may be a reference to Prithviraja's conflict with either Karna or Jayasimha Siddharaja, the Chaulukya kings of Gujarat. However, because the text does not provide any additional information, this cannot be said with certainty.

The Prabandha Kosha states that Prithviraja "pulled away the arms" of one Baguli Shah. This probably refers to his repulsion of a Ghaznavid invasion. Minhaj-i-Siraj, in his Tabaqat-i Nasiri, mentions that during the reign of Mas'ud III, the Ghaznavid general Hajib Taghatigin raided India, going beyond the Ganga river. It is possible that Baguli Shah was a subordinate of Hajib Taghatigin.

== Religious activities ==
Prithviraja appears to have been a Shaivite. According to the Prithviraja Vijaya, he built a food distribution centre (anna-satra) on the road to Somnath temple for pilgrims.

He also patronized Jainism. Vijayasimha Suri's Upadeśāmālavritti (1134 CE) and Chandra Suri's Munisuvrata-Charita (1136 CE) state that he donated golden kalashas (cupolas) for the Jain temples at Ranthambore.
