= Vigraharaja III =

King of Sapadalaksha
- Reign: c. 1079–1090 CE
- Predecessor: Durlabharaja III
- Successor: Prithviraja I
- Dynasty: Chahamanas of Shakambhari
- Father: Chamundaraja

Vigraharāja III (r. c. 1079–1090 CE) was an Indian king belonging to the Shakambhari Chahamana dynasty. He ruled the Sapadalaksha country, which included parts of present-day Rajasthan in north-western India.

== Early life ==
Vigraharaja III, also known as Visala or Bisala, was a son of the Chahamana king Chamundaraja. He succeeded his brother Durlabharaja III on the Chahamana throne.

== Alliance with the Paramaras ==
The name of Vigraharaja's queen was Rajadevi, as attested by the Bijolia rock inscription. The epic poem Vigraharaja Raso claims that he married Rajamati, the daughter of the earlier Paramara king Bhoja. However, Bhoja had died in 1055 CE, nearly 25 years before Vigraharaja's ascension. Historian R. B. Singh theorized that Bhoja's brother Udayaditya may have given his niece in marriage to Vigraharaja. According to Dasharatha Sharma, she might have been a daughter of Udayaditya.

Vigraharaja thus formed a matrimonial alliance with Udayaditya, the Paramara king of Malwa. The Prithviraja Vijaya states that he gave a horse named Saranga to Udayaditya, with whose help Udayaditya was able to defeat his rival Karna. Thus, Vigraharaja helped the Paramara king establish peace and prosperity in Malwa. The later text Surjana Charita also corroborates this account, but wrongly credits Vigraharaja with defeating Karna.

Vigraharaja is also said to have visited Ujjayini in Malwa to worship Shiva.

== Conflict with the Ghaznavids ==
The Hammira Mahakavya claims that Vigraharaja defeated Shahab-ud-Din, the king of Malwa. This is not historically accurate, because the Muslims did not rule Malwa until the beginning of the 14th century. According to historian R. B. Singh, Shahab-ud-Din may have been a general of Ibrahim of Ghazna.

== Death ==
According to Prabandha Kosha, Vigraharaja was a lustful man, and forcefully took away the wife of a Brahmin named Mahasatya. A curse by Mahasatya ultimately led to his death. Prithviraj Raso, another legendary text, claims that he raped a Vaishya girl who was praying the goddess Parvati. The girl's curse turned him into a demon named Dhundha. Because these two texts were composed centuries after Vigraharaja's death, it is hard to determine the historical accuracy of these legends.

Vigraharaja was succeeded by his son Prithviraja I.
