= Govindaraja III =

King of Sapadalaksha
- Reign: c. 1012–1026 CE
- Predecessor: Durlabharaja II
- Successor: Vakpatiraja II
- Dynasty: Chahamanas of Shakambhari

Govindaraja III (r. c. 1012–1026 CE), was an Indian king belonging to the Shakambhari Chahamana dynasty. He ruled the Sapadalaksha country, which included parts of present-day Rajasthan in north-western India.

== Reign ==
Govindaraja III, also known as Gandu, succeeded his brother Durlabharaja II. According to Prithviraja Vijaya, his title was Vairi-Gharatta ("grinder of enemies").

== Mahmud's invasion ==
Several sources suggest that the Muslim ruler Mahmud of Ghazni invaded the Chahamana kingdom during the reign of Govinda. The Prabandha Kosha states that Govindaraja defeated Mahmud. This claim is of doubtful accuracy, because this victory is not mentioned in earlier texts such as Prithviraja-Vijaya, which are historically much more reliable.

It might be possible that Mahmud chose to avoid a confrontation with a Hindu confederacy, of which Govinda was a part. According to the 16th-century Muslim historian Firishta, Mahmud reached Multan in December 1024 CE. From there, he marched to Ajmer, which was a part of the Chahamana territory. The residents of the city had abandoned it by the time he reached there. Mahmud initially wanted to sack the city, but gave up the plan realizing that besieging the fort would waste his time. He then marched away to Gujarat. After sacking Gujarat, he marched back to Multan via Sindh, because a confederacy of Hindu rulers had organized an army to counter him.

Govindaraja III was succeeded by his son Vakpatiraja II.
