= Chahamanas of Shakambhari =

Kingdom in Rajputana (551–1192)

Sapadalaksha
- 551–1192
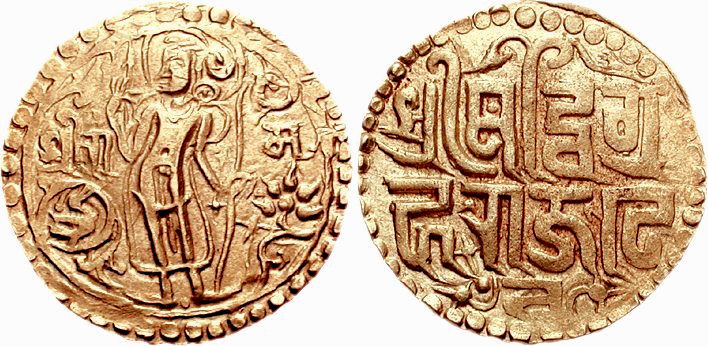
- Coin of the Chahamana ruler Vigraharaja IV, c. 1150 – c. 1164. Obverse: Rama standing left, holding bow; "sri ra ma" in Devanagari. Reverse: "Srimad vigra/ha raja de/va" in Devanagari; star and moon symbols below.

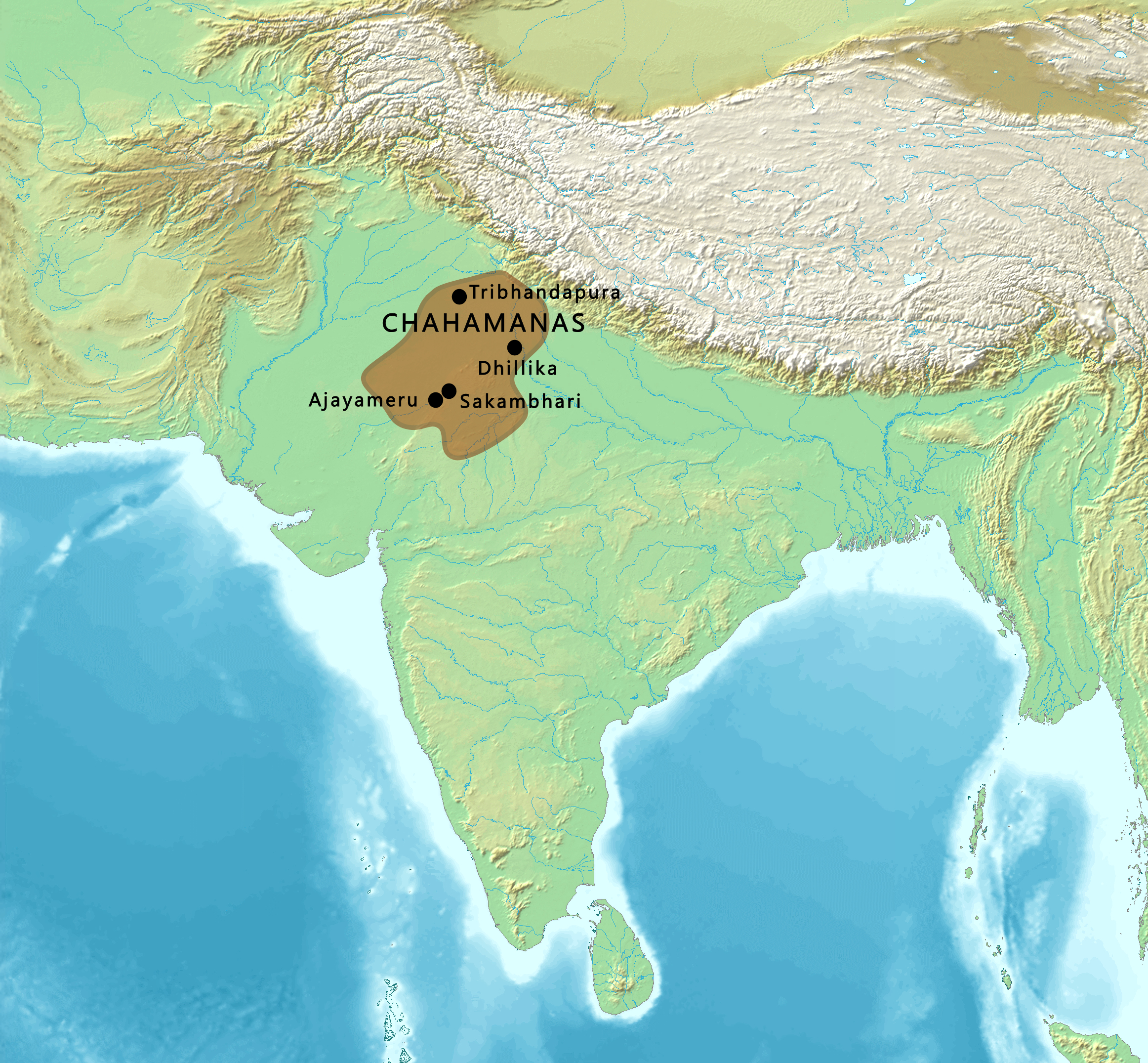
- Approximate territory of the Chahamanas of Shakambhari circa 1150–1192 CE.
- Status: Vassals of the Pratiharas (at least 784–948); Independent kingdom (948–1192, 1193–1194); Vassals of the Ghurids (1192)
- Capital: Shakambhari (modern Sambhar); later Ajayameru (Modern Ajmer)
- Religion: Hinduism; Jainism
- Government: Monarchy
- Maharajadhiraja
  - 6th century: Vasudeva (first)
  - c. 1193–1194 CE: Hariraja (last)
- History
  - Established: 551
  - Second Battle of Tarain: 1192
Preceded by	Succeeded by
Pratihara dynasty; Tomara dynasty	Ghurid dynasty; Chahamanas of Ranastambhapura
- Today part of: India: Rajasthan

The Chahamanas of Shakambhari (IAST: Cāhamāna), colloquially known as the Chauhans of Sambhar or Chauhans of Ajmer, were an Indian dynasty that ruled parts of present-day Rajasthan and neighbouring areas between the sixth and twelfth centuries in the Indian subcontinent. The territory ruled by them was known as Sapadalaksha. They were the most prominent ruling family of the Chauhan clan of Rajputs.

The Chahamanas of Shakambhari were initially vassals of the Gurjara-Pratihara Empire until the 10th century, with their original capital at Shakambhari (modern-day Sambhar). Following the decline of Pratihara power, the Chahamana ruler Simharaja asserted independence and assumed the title Maharajadhiraja. In the early 12th century, Chahamana power began to rise, and Ajayaraja II transferred the kingdom's capital to Ajayameru (modern-day Ajmer), after which the dynasty is also known as the Chahamanas of Ajmer, or the Chauhans of Ajmer.

The Chahamanas fought several wars with neighbouring dynasties, including the Chaulukyas of Gujarat, the Tomaras of Delhi, the Paramaras of Malwa, and the Chandelas of Jejakabhukti. From the 11th century onward, they also faced invasions from Muslim powers, initially the Ghaznavids and later the Ghurids. The kingdom reached its greatest extent under Vigraharaja IV in the mid-12th century. Chahamana power effectively ended in 1192 CE, when Muhammad of Ghor defeated Prithviraja III (Prithviraj Chauhan) at the Second Battle of Tarain and subsequently executed him, installing his son Govindaraja IV as a Ghurid vassal. Later, Hariraja rebelled against the Ghurids but was defeated in 1194 CE. Following his defeat, Hariraja, along with members of his family (dynasty), committed suicide by self-immolation, bringing the Chahamana dynasty of Shakambhari to an end.

== Origin ==
According to the 1170 CE Bijolia rock inscription of Someshvara, the early Chahamana king Samantaraja was born at Ahichchhatrapura in the gotra of sage Vatsa. Historian R. B. Singh theorizes that the Chahamanas probably started out as petty rulers of Ahichchhatrapura (identified with Nagaur), and moved their capital to Shakambhari (Sambhar) as their kingdom grew. Later, they became the vassals of the Imperial Pratiharas.

Several mythical accounts of the dynasty's origin also exist. The earliest of the dynasty's inscriptions and literary works state that the dynasty's progenitor was a legendary hero named Chahamana. They variously state that this hero was born from Indra's eye, in the lineage of the sage Vatsa, in the solar dynasty and/or during a ritual sacrifice performed by Brahma. A popular medieval account classifies the dynasty among the four Agnivanshi clans, whose ancestors are said to have come out of sacrificial fire pit. The earliest sources to mention this legend are the 16th century recensions of Prithviraj Raso. Some colonial-era historians interpreted this myth to suggest a foreign origin of the dynasty, speculating that the foreign warriors were initiated into the Hindu society through a fire ritual. However, the earliest extant copy of Prithviraj Raso does not mention this legend at all. Instead, it states that the first ruler of the dynasty was Manikya Rai, who is said to have been born from Brahma's sacrifice.

== Territory ==
The core territory of the Chahamanas was located in present-day Rajasthan. It was known as Sapadalaksha (IAST: Sapādalakṣa) or Jangala-desha (IAST: Jangaladeśa).

The term Jangladesha ("rough and arid country") appears to be older, as it mentioned in the Mahabharata. The text does not mention the exact location of the region. The later Sanskrit texts, such as Bhava Prakasha and Shabdakalpadruma Kosha suggest that it was a hot, arid region, where trees requiring little water grew. The region is identified with the area around Bikaner.

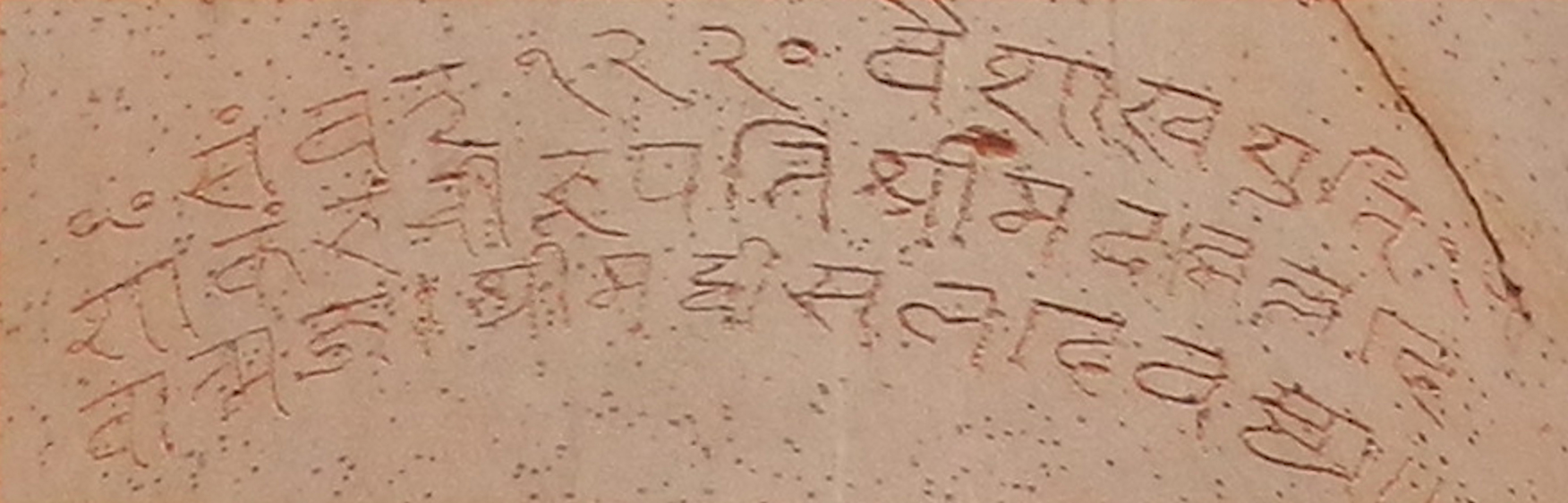
Visaladeva inscription on the Delhi-Topra pillar, 12th century.

The term Sapadalaksha (literally "one and a quarter lakhs" or 125,000) refers to the large number of villages in the area. It became prominent during the Chahamana reign. It appears that the term originally referred to the area around modern Nagaur near Bikaner. This area was known as Savalak (vernacular form of Sapadalaksha) in as late as 20th century. The early Chahamana king Samantaraja was based in Ahichchhatrapura, which can be identified with modern Nagaur. The ancient name of Nagaur was Nagapura, which means "the city of the serpent". Ahichchhatrapura has a similar meaning: "the city whose chhatra or protector is serpent".

As the Chahamana territory expanded, the entire region ruled by them came to be known as Sapadalaksha. This included the later Chahamana capitals Ajayameru (Ajmer) and Shakambhari (Sambhar). The term also came to be applied to the larger area captured by the Chahamanas. The early medieval Indian inscriptions and the writings of the contemporary Muslim historians suggest that the following cities were also included in Sapadalaksha: Hansi (now in Haryana), Mandore (now in Marwar region), and Mandalgarh (now in Mewar region).

== History ==
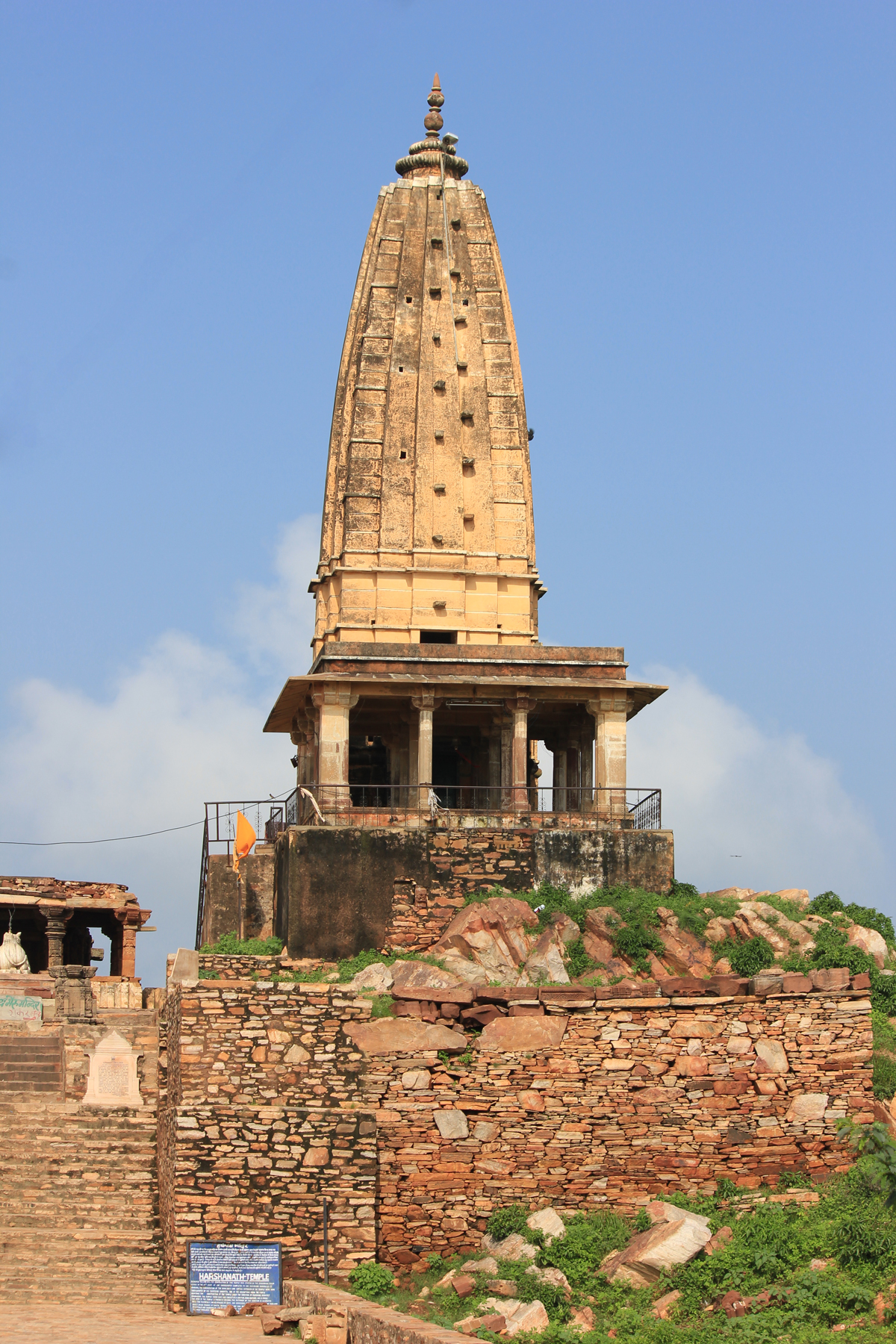
The Harshnath temple was commissioned by the Chahamana rulers

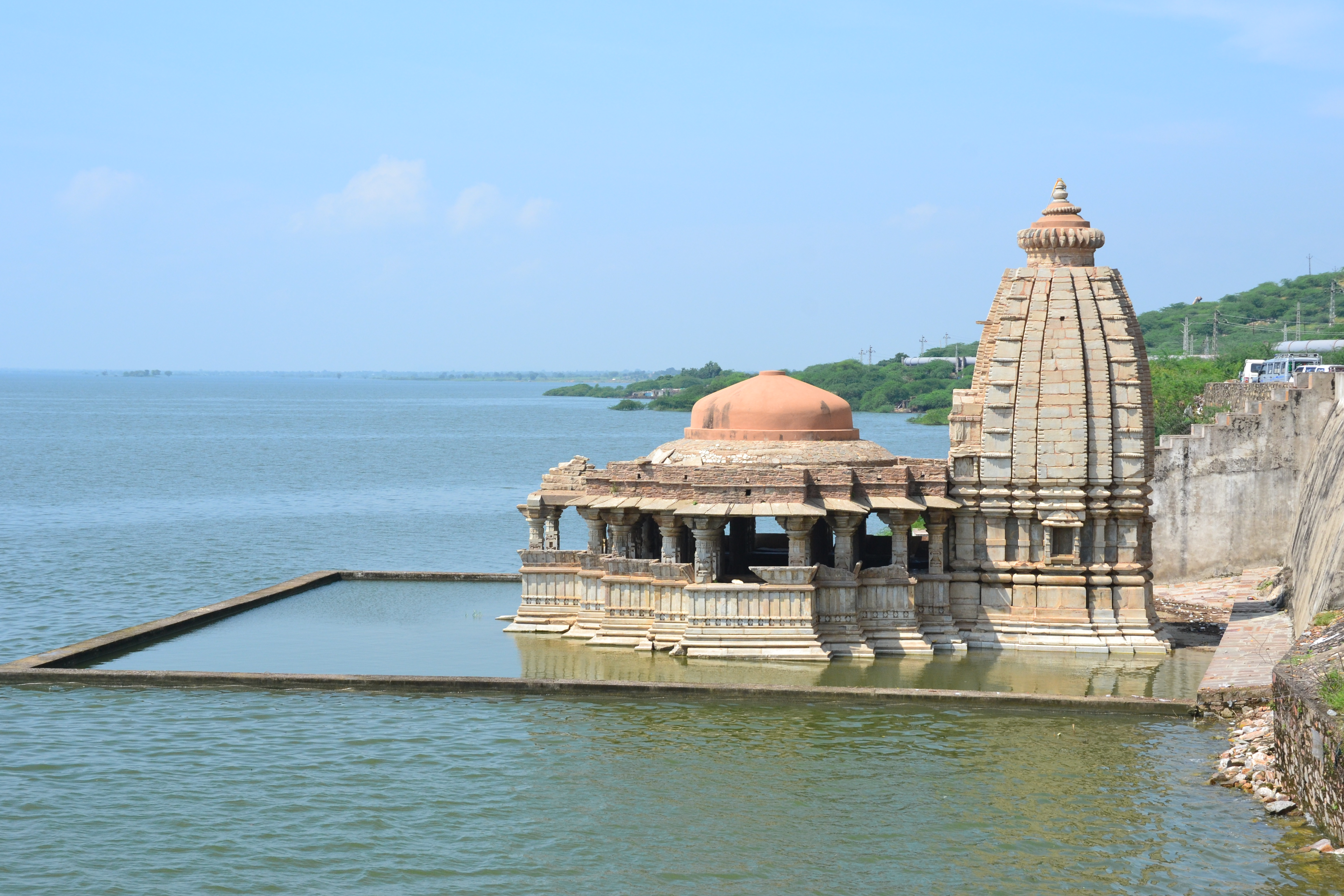
Bisaldeo temple commissioned by Vigraharaja IV

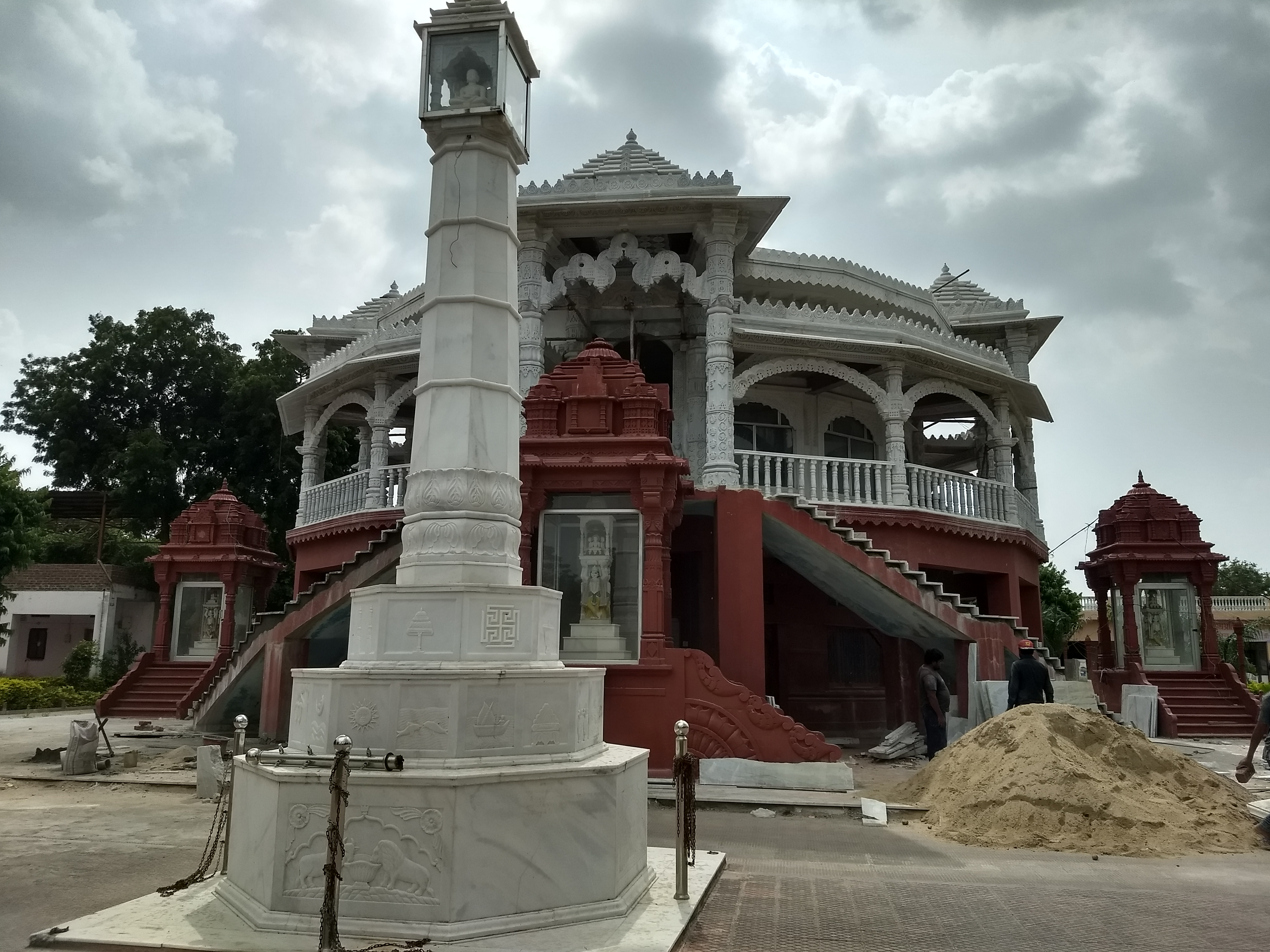
Bijolia Parshvanath temple built during the reign of King Somesvara

The earliest historical Chahamana king is the 6th century ruler Vasudeva. According to a legendary account in Prithviraja Vijaya, he received the Sambhar Salt Lake as a gift from a vidyadhara (a supernatural being). Little is known about his immediate successors. The 8th century Chahamana ruler Durlabharaja I and his successors are known to have served the Gurjara-Pratiharas as vassals. In 10th century, Vakpatiraja I made an attempt to overthrow the Gurjara-Pratihara suzerainty, and assumed the title Maharaja ("great king"). His younger son Lakshmana established the Naddula Chahamana branch. Vakpatiraja's elder son and successor Simharaja assumed the title Maharajadhiraja ("king of great kings"), which suggests that he was a sovereign ruler.

Simharaja's successors consolidated the Chahamana power by engaging in wars with their neighbours, including the Chaulukyas of Gujarat and the Tomaras of Delhi. The dynasty's earliest extant inscription (973 CE) is from the reign of Vigraharaja II. During the reign of Viryarama (r. c. 1040 CE), the Paramara king Bhoja invaded the Chahamana kingdom, and probably occupied their capital Shakambhari for a brief period. Chamundaraja restored the Chahamana power, possibly with the help of the Naddula Chahamanas.

The subsequent Chahamana kings faced several Ghaznavid raids. Ajayaraja II (r. c. 1110–1135 CE) repulsed a Ghaznavid attack, and also defeated the Paramara king Naravarman. He moved the kingdom's capital from Shakambhari to Ajayameru (Ajmer), a city that he either established or greatly expanded. His successor Arnoraja raided the Tomara territory, and also defeated the Ghaznavid ruler Bahram Shah in the Slaughter of Turushkas near Ajmer. However, he suffered setbacks against the Gujarat Chaulukya kings Jayasimha Siddharaja and Kumarapala, and was killed by his own son Jagaddeva.

Arnoraja's younger son Vigraharaja IV greatly expanded the Chahamana territories, and captured Delhi from the Tomaras. He also defeated Ghaznavid King Khusrau Shah in Vigraharaja IV's first war against the Muslims. His kingdom included parts of the present-day Rajasthan, Haryana, and Delhi. It probably also included a part of Punjab (to the south-east of Sutlej river) and a portion of the northern Gangetic plain (to the west of Yamuna). His 1164 CE Delhi-Shivalik pillar inscription claims that he conquered the region between the Himalayas and the Vindhyas, and thus restored the rule of Aryans in Aryavarta. While this is an exaggeration, it is not completely baseless. The inscription was originally found in Topra village, near the Shivalik Hills (Himalayan foothills). Also, the exiled ruler of Malwa (Vindhyan region) possibly acknowledged his suzerainty. Thus Vigraharaja's influence extended from the Himalayas to the Vindhyas, at least in name.

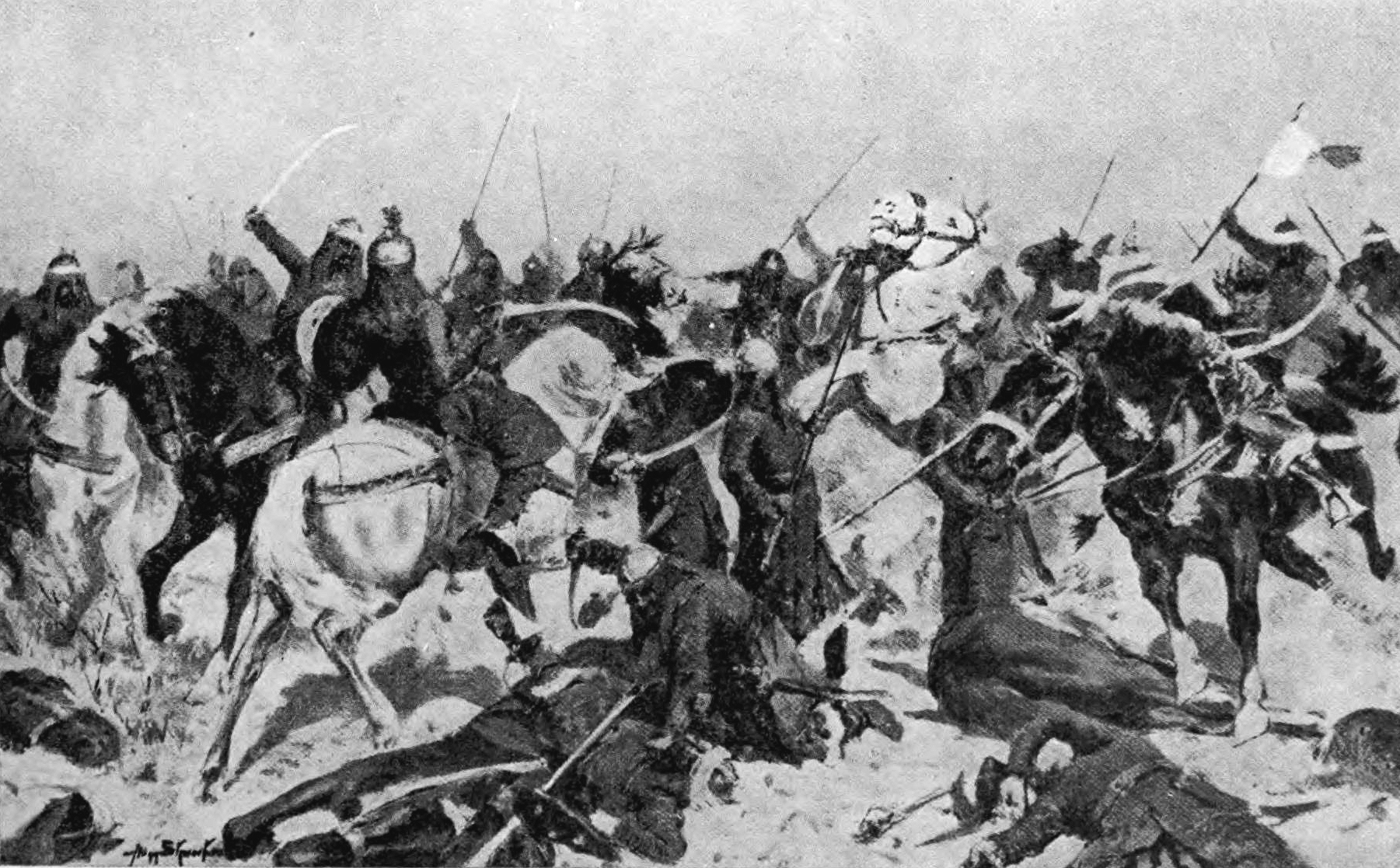
The last stand of the Rajputs, depicting the Second Battle of Tarain in 1192, against the forces of the Ghurid Empire.

Vigraharaja was succeeded by his son Amaragangeya, and then his nephew Prithviraja II. Subsequently, his younger brother Someshvara ascended the throne.

The most celebrated ruler of the dynasty was Someshvara's son Prithviraja III, better known as Prithviraj Chauhan. He defeated several neighbouring kings, including the Chandela ruler Paramardi in 1182–83, although he could not annex the Chandela territory to his kingdom. In 1191, he defeated the Ghurid Empire king Muhammad of Ghor at the first Battle of Tarain. However, the next year, he was defeated at the second Battle of Tarain by Muhammad of Ghor, and subsequently killed.

Muhammad of Ghor appointed Prithviraja's son Govindaraja IV as a vassal. Prithviraja's brother Hariraja dethroned him, and regained control of a part of his ancestral kingdom. Hariraja was defeated by the Ghurids in 1194 CE. Govindaraja was granted the fief of Ranthambore by the Ghurids. There, he established a new branch of the dynasty.

== Cultural activities ==
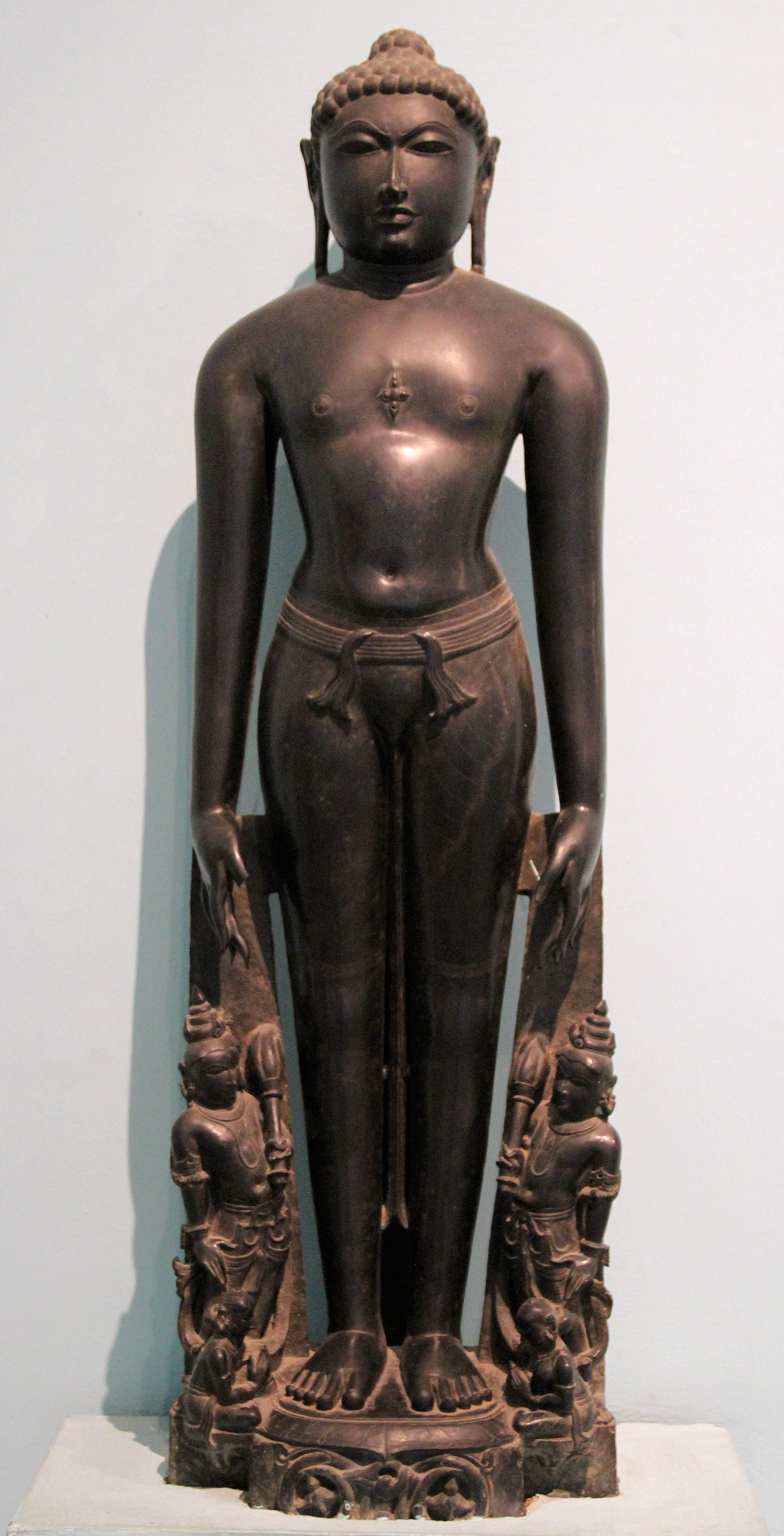
Statue of Neminatha (Jainism), Chahamanas Dynasty, Narhar, Rajasthan, 11th century CE. National Museum, New Delhi.

The Chahamanas commissioned a number of Hindu temples, several of which were destroyed by the Ghurid invaders after the defeat of Prithviraja III.

Multiple Chahamana rulers contributed to the construction of the Harshanatha temple, which was probably commissioned by Govindaraja I. According to Prithviraja Vijaya:

- Simharaja commissioned a large Shiva temple at Pushkar
- Chamundaraja commissioned a Vishnu temple at Narapura (modern Narwar in Ajmer district)
- Prithviraja I built a food distribution centre (anna-satra) on the road to Somnath temple for pilgrims.
- Someshvara commissioned a number of temples, including five temples in Ajmer.

Vigraharaja IV was known for his patronage to arts and literature, and himself composed the play Harikeli Nataka. The structure that was later converted into the Adhai Din Ka Jhonpra mosque was constructed during his reign.

The Chahamana rulers also patronized Jainism. Vijayasimha Suri's Upadeśāmālavritti (1134 CE) and Chandra Suri's Munisuvrata-Charita (1136 CE) state that Prithviraja I donated golden kalashas (cupolas) for the Jain temples at Ranthambore. The Kharatara-Gachchha-Pattavali states that Ajayaraja II allowed the Jains to build their temples in his capital Ajayameru (Ajmer), and also donated a golden kalasha to a Parshvanatha temple. Someshvara granted the Revna village to a Parshvanatha temple. Bijolia Parshvanath temples was constructed in 1160 CE by Mahajan Lala during the reign of King Somesvara.

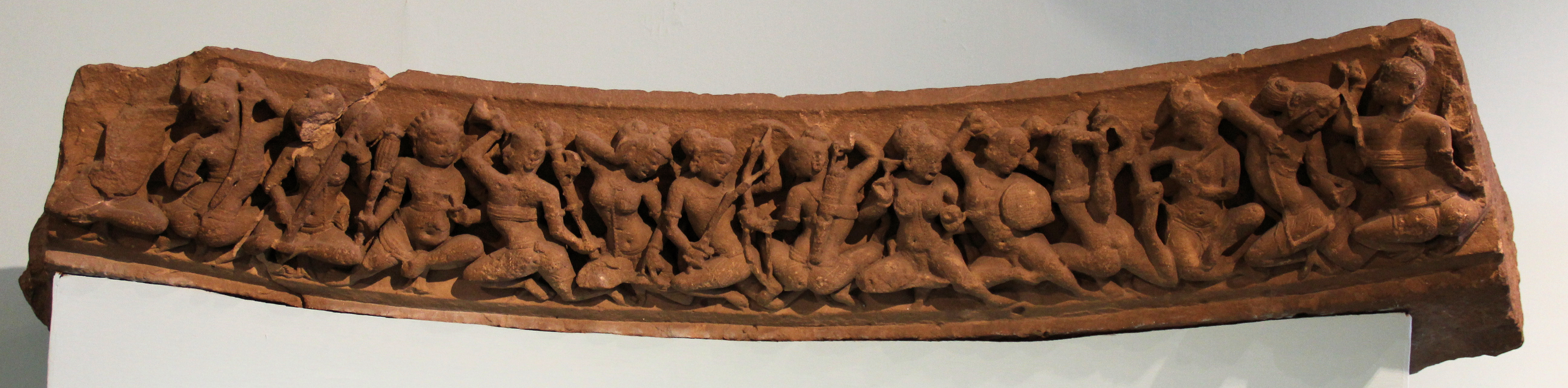
Victory scene, Chahamanas Dynasty, Sikar, Rajasthan, 10th century CE. National Museum, New Delhi.

== List of rulers ==
The Chahamanas of Shakambhari and main South Asian polities in 1175, on the eve of the Ghurid Empire invasion of the subcontinent.

Find spots of the inscriptions issued during the Shakambhari Chahamana reign.

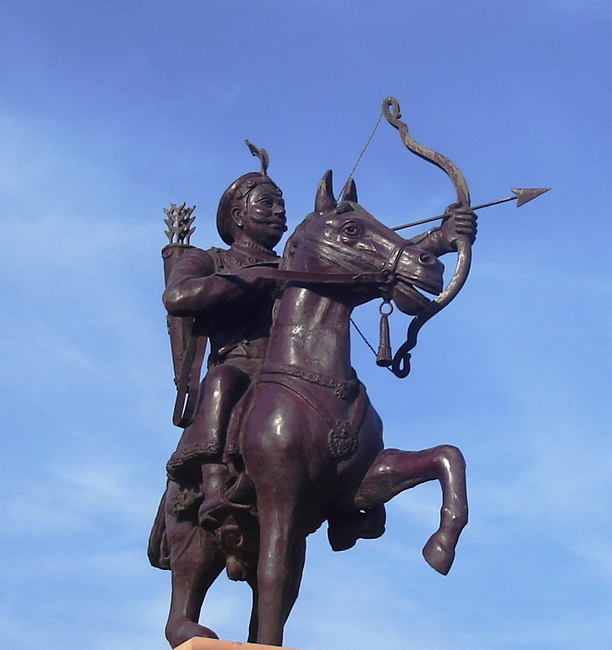
Prithviraja III, the most celebrated ruler of the dynasty

The sovereigns adopted grandiloquent titles such as Paramabhattaraka, Parameshvara and Maharajadhiraja.

Following is a list of Chahamana rulers of Shakambhari and Ajmer, with approximate period of reign, as estimated by R. B. Singh:

#	Ruler	Reign (CE)
1	Chahamana	(legendary)
2	Vasu-deva	c. 551 CE (disputed)
3	Samanta-raja	684–709
4	Nara-deva	709–721
5	Ajaya-raja I	721–734
6	Vigraha-raja I	734–759
7	Chandra-raja I	759–771
8	Gopendra-raja	771–784
9	Durlabha-raja I	784–809
10	Govinda-raja I alias Guvaka I	809–836
11	Chandra-raja II	836–863
12	Govindaraja II alias Guvaka II	863–890
13	Chandana-raja	890–917
14	Vakpati-raja	917–944
15	Simha-raja	944–971
16	Vigraha-raja II	971–998
17	Durlabha-raja II	998–1012
18	Govinda-raja III	1012–1026
19	Vakpati-raja II	1026–1040
20	Viryarama	1040 (few months)
21	Chamunda-raja	1040–1065
22	Durlabha-raja III alias Duśala	1065–1070
23	Vigraha-raja III alias Visala	1070–1090
24	Prithvi-raja I	1090–1110
25	Ajaya-raja II with Queen Somalladevi	1110–1135
26	Arno-raja alias Ana	1135–1150
27	Jagad-deva	1150
28	Vigraha-raja IV alias Visaladeva	1150–1164
29	Apara-gangeya	1164–1165
30	Prithvi-raja II	1165–1169
31	Someshvara	1169–1178
32	Prithviraja III (Rai Pithora)	1177–1192
33	Govinda-raja IV	1192
34	Hari-raja	1193–1194
