= Someshvara (Chahamana dynasty) =

Chauhan king of Sambhar (c. 1169–1178)

- Pratāpalaṃkeśvara

King of Sapadalaksha
- Reign: 1169–1177
- Predecessor: Prithviraja II
- Successor: Prithviraja III
- Consort: Karpuradevi
- Issue: Prithviraj Chauhan, Hariraja
- Dynasty: Chahamanas of Shakambhari
- Father: Arnoraja
- Mother: Kanchana-devi
- Religion: Hinduism

Someshvara (IAST: Someśvara, r. 1169–1177) was an Indian king belonging to the Chahamana dynasty and ruled parts of present-day Rajasthan in north-western India. He was brought up at the Chaulukya court in Gujarat by his maternal relatives. After death of Prithviraja II, the Chahamana ministers brought him to the capital Ajmer and appointed him as the new king. He is said to have commissioned several Shiva temples in Ajmer, and is best known as the father of Prithviraja III (Prithviraj Chauhan).

== Early life ==
Someshvara was a son of the Chahamana king Arnoraja. His mother Kanchana-devi was a daughter of Jayasimha Siddharaja, the Chaulukya king of Gujarat. According to the legendary chronicle Prithviraja Vijaya, some astrologers told Jayasimha that Someshvara's son would be an incarnation of Rama. Because of this, Jayasimha took Someshvara to Gujarat, where he was brought up. Jayasimha's successor Kumarapala was also very affectionate towards Someshvara, although he was not on good terms with Arnoraja. During the reign of Kumarapala, Someshvara married Karpura-devi, the daughter of king Achala or Tejala of Tripuri. The Tripuri king is identified as the Kalachuri ruler Narasimha-deva. Prithviraja III and Hariraja, the two sons of Someshvara and Karpura, were born in Gujarat.

The Prithviraja-Vijaya states that Someshvara beheaded the king of Kunkuna (Konkana) during Kumarapala's campaign in that region. This king is identified with Mallikarjuna, the Shilahara ruler of Konkan. This event can be dated to sometime between 1160 and 1162 CE. Kumarapala-Charita gives the credit for killing the Konkana ruler to Amrabhata (alias Ambada), a son of the Chaulukya prime minister Udayana. Historians Dasharatha Sharma and R. B. Singh theorize that Amrabhata was the chief commander of the campaign, while Someshvara was the subordinate general who actually killed Mallikarjuna.

== Accession to the throne ==
Someshvara had two half-brothers: Vigraharaja IV and Jagaddeva. His father Arnoraja was succeeded by Jagaddeva and then Vigraharaja IV. The next two rulers were Vigraharaja's son Aparagangeya and Jagaddeva's son Prithviraja II. According to Prithviraja Vijaya, the Chahamana ministers recalled Someshvara from the Chaulukya court after the death of his nephew Prithviraja II. Someshvara came to the Chahamana capital Ajmer with his family, and became the new king.

According to the Bijolia inscription, he assumed the title Pratapalankeshvara. Two of his ministers, a father-son duo named Skanda and Sodha, were Gujarati Nagar Brahmins. They probably accompanied him from Gujarat to Ajmer at the time of his ascension.

== Reign ==
Find-spots of inscriptions from Someshvara's reign

Five inscriptions from Someshvara's reign have been discovered so far. These inscriptions are dated between 1169 CE and 1177 CE (1226-1234 VS). They have been found at Amalda (or Anvalda), Bijolia, Dhod, and Rewasa.

According to Prithviraja-Vijaya, Someshvara established a town at the place where the palaces of his brother Vigraharaja IV were located. He named this town after his father. Close to the temples commissioned by Vigraharaja IV, he also commissioned a taller temple dedicated to Vaidyanatha (an aspect of Shiva). The temple also had images of Brahma and Vishnu. This temple housed an effigy of him and his father on horseback. He also commissioned four other temples in Ajmer, one of which was dedicated to Tripurusha. Although he was a Shaivite, he was tolerant towards Jains, as indicated by his grant of the Revna village to a Parshvanatha temple.

He issued Tomara-style copper coins that bear the name Shri Someshvara-deva with the picture of a horse on one side; and the legend Ashavari Shri-Samanta-deva with the picture of a humped bull on the other side. His son Prithviraja III also issued similar coins. These coins were inspired by the Tomara bull-and-horseman coins featuring the legend Shri Samanta-deva. The Chahamanas succeeded the Tomaras in Delhi, which resulted in this imitated coinage.

The historically unreliable Prithviraj Raso claims that Someshvara died in a battle against Bhima II, the Chaulukya king of Gujarat. This claim is historically inaccurate, but there is some evidence of a conflict between the Chaulukyas and the Chahamanas during his reign. According to Patan inscription of Bhima II, his ancestor Ajayapala (the son of Kumarapala) extracted tribute from the ruler of Sapadalaksha (the Chahamana territory). The Chaulukya court poet Someshvara (not to be confused with the king), in his Kirtikaumudi, also states that Ajayapala obtained a mandapika (pavallion) and some elephants from the ruler of the Jangala country (a part of the Chahamana territory). Dasharatha Sharma identifies Someshvara as the ruler subdued by Ajayapala. Historian R. B. Singh, on the other hand, theorizes that the supposed 'tribute' was merely a gift sent by Someshvara to Ajayapala's on latter's ascension to the throne; the event was exaggerated into a claim of victory by the Gujarat poets. To support his theory, Singh argues that the Chaulukya power had weakened considerably after Kumarapala's death, and they could not have subdued the powerful Chahamanas at this time.

Someshvara appears to have died in 1177 CE (1234 VS), and was succeeded by his elder son Prithviraja III (better known as Prithviraj Chauhan in the vernacular folk legends). The last inscription from Someshvara's reign and the first inscription from Prithviraja's reign are both dated to this year. Prithviraja, who was a minor at the time, ascended the throne with his mother as the regent. The Hammira Mahakavya claims that Someshvara himself installed Prithviraja on the throne, and then retired to the forest. But this claim doesn't appear to be historically accurate.

== In popular culture ==
- 2006–2009: Dharti Ka Veer Yodha Prithviraj Chauhan, broadcast by Star Plus, where he was portrayed by Jas Arora.
- 2025: Chakravarti Samrat Prithviraj Chauhan, broadcast by Sony Entertainment Television, played by Ronit Roy.
