= Govindaraja =

Govindaraja may refer to:

- Govindaraja I (r. c. 809-836 CE), Shakambhari Chahamana king of India
- Govindaraja II (r. c. 863-890 CE), Shakambhari Chahamana king of India
- Govindaraja III (r. c. 1012-1026 CE), Shakambhari Chahamana king of India
- Govindaraja IV (r. c. 1192 CE), Shakambhari Chahamana king of India
- Govinda II (r. c. 774 – c. 780 CE), Rashtrakuta Emperor of India

== See also ==
- Govindaraja Temple (disambiguation)
- Govindarajan (disambiguation)
