= Simharaja =

- Maharajadhiraja

King of Sapadalaksha
- Reign: c. 944–971 CE
- Predecessor: Vakpatiraja I
- Successor: Vigraharaja II
- Dynasty: Chahamanas of Shakambhari

Simharaja (IAST: Siṃharāja, r. c. 944–971 CE) was an Indian king belonging to the Shakambhari Chahamana dynasty. He ruled the Sapadalaksha country, which included parts of present-day Rajasthan in north-western India. He was the first Chahamana ruler to assume the title Maharajadhiraja.

== Early life ==
Most sources mention Simharaja as the successor of his father Vakpatiraja I. However, the Bijolia inscription places one Vindhyanṛpati (or Vindhyaraja) between Vakpati and Simharaja. Historian H. C. Ray theorized that Vindhyanṛpati was a part of Vakpati's name. But according to Dasharatha Sharma, Vindhyanṛpati was probably an elder brother of Simharaja and had a very short reign.

== Military career ==
Simharaja was the first ruler of the family to assume the title Maharajadhiraja ("great king of kings"). This suggests that he became independent of the Gurjara-Pratiharas, the overlords of his ancestors.

According to the Harsha inscription, Simharaja killed the Tomara chief Salavana (or Lavana), whose soldiers either fled the battlefield or were imprisoned. The prisoners were released only when the common overlord of these two rulers came to Simharaja and secured their release. The overlord, who is called Raghukule Bhuchakravarti ("Emperor from Raghu's family") in the inscription, was probably a weak Gurjara-Pratihara emperor. Although the identity of this emperor is not clear; he might have been Devapala or one of his successors, such as Vijayapala or Rajyapala. Salavana probably belonged to the Tomara dynasty of Delhi; historian R. B. Singh identifies him with Tejapala, who has been mentioned as the contemporary Tomara king in a Kumaon-Garhwal manuscript. He probably belonged to same family as Rudra, who had been killed by Simharaja's grandfather Chandana.

Simharaja is also said to have defeated a Muslim general. The Prabandha Kosha names the defeated general as Heji-ud-Din, and states that the battle took place at Jethan (possibly modern Jethana). The Hammira Mahakavya calls him Hetim, and states that Simharaja captured four of his elephants after killing him. The identity of the defeated general is uncertain, but he might have been a subordinate of the Amir of Multan.

The Hammira Mahakavya further claims that Simharaja defeated the kings of Gujrata, Lata, Karnataka, Chola and Anga. This is obviously a hyperbole, although Simharaja may have achieved some military successes against his neighbours.

== Personal life ==
The Prithviraja Vijaya suggests that like his father, Simharaja was a devout Shaivite, and commissioned a large temple dedicated to Shiva at Pushkara. He also extended the Harshadeva temple, and granted four villages for its maintenance: Simhagoshtha, Trailkalakaka, Ishanakupa, and Kansapallika. The Kinsariya inscription describes him as naya-sutra-yuktah, which probably indicates that he was knowledgeable about logic (see Nyāya Sūtras).

== Last days ==
Simharaja was succeeded by his sons Vigraharaja II and Durlabharaja II in that order. He had two other sons, Chandraraja and Govindaraja (not to be confused with the earlier Chahamana kings bearing same names). The Harsha inscription states that Vigraharaja revived the fortunes of his distressed family. This indicates that Simharaja suffered a tragic defeat at the end of his life. His enemies might have included the Pratiharas.
