= Prithviraja Vijaya =

Sanskrit epic poem

- Author: Jayanaka
- Original title: पृथ्वीराज विजय
- Language: Sanskrit
- Subject: Biographical epic poem
- Genre: Epic, Eulogy
- Publication date: 12th century
- Publication place: India

Prithviraja Vijaya (IAST: Pṛthvīrāja Vijaya, "Prithviraja's Victory") is an eulogistic Sanskrit epic poem on the life of the Indian Chahamana king Prithviraja III (better known as Prithviraj Chauhan in the vernacular folk legends). It is believed to have been composed around 1191-1192 CE by Jayanaka, a Kashmiri poet-historian in the court of Prithviraja.

Some portions of the poem are now lost. Besides Prithviraja's biography, the poem also gives an account of his ancestors.

== Manuscript ==
The only known manuscript of Prithviraja Vijaya is a birch bark manuscript written in Sharada script. It was discovered by Georg Bühler in 1875, when he was searching for Sanskrit manuscripts in Kashmir. The manuscript is highly mutilated, and several parts of the text (including the author's name) are missing from it.

== Authorship ==
Although the author's name is missing from the manuscript, Har Bilas Sarda theorized that the text was composed by Jayanaka, who was a court-poet of Prithviraja. This theory is based on the following points:

- Canto 12 of the poem records the entry of the Kashmiri poet Jayanaka in Prithviraja's court
- In Canto 1, Prithviraja is expected to listen to the poem. This indicates that the poem was composed by one of his court-poets.
- The author appears to have been a Kashmiri Pandit:
  - The poetic style closely resembles that of the 11th century Kashmiri poet Bilhana
  - The mangalacharana (prayer) and criticism of other poets at the beginning of the text match the ones in Bilhana's Vikramanka-Deva-Charita (another eulogistic poem, on the life of Vikramaditya VI).
  - The poem praises Kashmir in Canto 12
  - The Kashmiri scholar Jonaraja wrote a commentary on the text
  - The only contemporary known to have quoted the poem was Jayaratha, also a Kashmiri.
  - The manuscript was discovered in Kashmir

== Date of composition ==
The poem is quoted by the Kashmiri scholar Jayaratha in his Vimarshini (c. 1200 CE), so it was definitely composed before this date.

The poem mentions Prithviraja's victory over Muhammad of Ghor in the first Battle of Tarain, but does not cover his defeat in the second battle. This indicates that it was most probably written during 1191-1192 CE, in the period between the two battles. Thus, Prithviraja Vijaya is the only extant literary text from the reign of Prithviraja.

== Content ==
=== Canto 1 ===
The first canto praises the ancient poets Valmiki, Vyasa and Bhasa. It also mentions the contemporary poets Krishna and Vishvaroopa. The poem eulogizes Vishvaroopa, a native of Ajmer, and a friend and guide of the author.

The poem then praises the king, Prithviraja III, who greatly honoured the poet. It mentions that Prithviraja had shown a promise of future greatness during his childhood. It also mentions that the king was proficient in six languages.

Next, the poem describes Pushkar, the place of the poet's residence, and a town near the Chahamana capital Ajmer. It states that Ajagandha Mahadeva, a temple dedicated to Shiva, was located at Pushkar. In the poem, Brahma tells Vishnu that originally, there were three yajna-kundas (sacrificial fire pits) at the site, which eventually became lakes. Brahma requests Vishnu to take birth on the earth to "rectify the Muslim desecration of Pushkar", and as a result Prithviraja - whom the text identifies as a form of Vishnu - is born.

=== Canto 2 ===
Chahamana, the founder of Prithviraja's dynasty, emerged from the orbit of the sun. He was thus a member of the legendary solar dynasty. His brother Dhananjaya served as his commander-in-chief. King Vasudeva was born in Chahamana's lineage.

=== Canto 3-4 ===
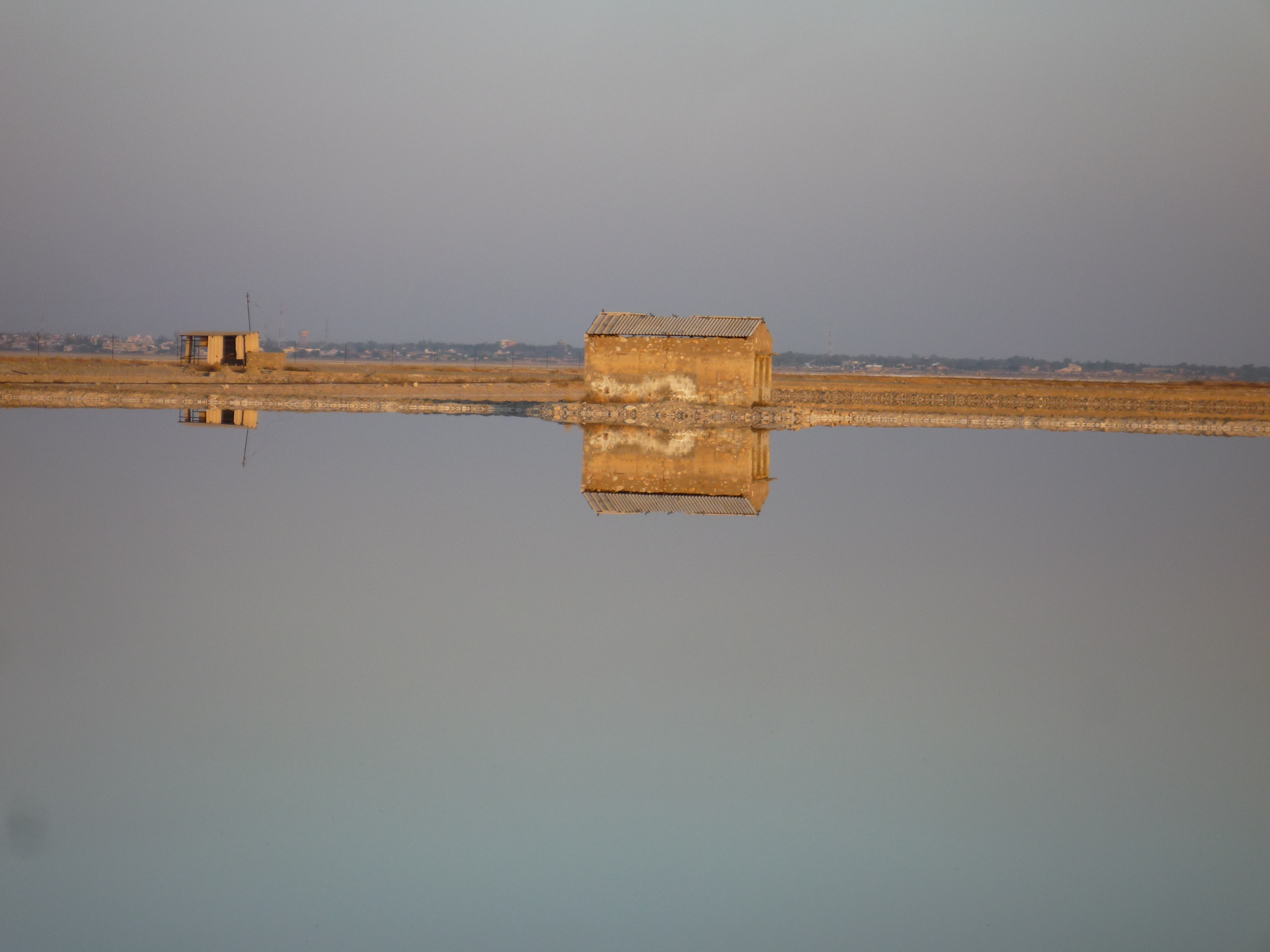
The Sambhar Salt Lake

During a hunting expedition in a forest, Vasudeva found a magic pill and restored it to its owner, a vidyadhara (supernatural being). The pleased vidyadhara told him that the goddess Parvati resided in the forest under the name Shakambhari. He also magically conjured up a salt lake (the Sambhar Salt Lake). He told Vasudeva that this lake would always remain in the possession of the king's family, protected by Shakambhari and Ashapuri (the king's family deity).

=== Canto 5 ===
A genealogy of Prithviraja's ancestors is given:

- Vasudeva
- Samantaraja
- Naradeva
- Ajayaraja I
- Vigraharaja I
- Chandraraja I
- Gopendraraja
- Durlabharaja I
- Govindaraja I
- Chandraraja II
- Govindaraja II
- Chandanaraja
- Vakpatiraja I
- Simharaja
- Vigraharaja II
- Durlabharaja II
- Govindaraja III
- Vakpatiraja II
- Viryarama
- Chamundaraja
- Durlabharaja III
- Vigraharaja III
- Prithviraja I
- Ajayaraja II
- Arnoraja
- Jagaddeva
- Vigraharaja IV
- Amaragangeya
- Prithviraja II
- Someshvara

The canto also briefly describes the reigns of some of the early Chahamana rulers:

- The sister of Govindaraja II (alias Guvaka II) had twelve suitors, but she married the king of Kanyakubja (Kannauj). He defeated the other suitors, and gave their wealth to his sister.
- Chandanaraja's queen Rudrani, also called Atmaprabha or Yogini, installed 1000 Shiva lingams on the banks of the Pushkar lake. These lingams were like lamps that removed darkness.
- Vakpatiraja I won 188 battles, and constructed a Shiva temple at Pushkar.
- Vigraharaja II defeated Mularaja, the king of Gujarat, who had to flee to Kantha-durga (Kanthkot). Vigraharaja built a temple of the goddess Ashapuri on the banks of the river Rewa (Narmada).
- Vakpatiraja II killed Amba-Prasada, the ruler of Aghat.
- Viryarama was killed by Bhoja of Malwa.
- Chamundaraja erected a Vishnu temple at Narpur (Narwar).
- Durlabharaja III died in a battle against the Matangas (Muslims).
- Vigraharaja II gave a horse named Saranga to Udayaditya of Malwa. With help of this horse, Udayaditya defeated the king of Gujarat.
- Prithviraja I killed 700 Chaulukyas who had come to rob the Brahmins in Pushkar. He also set up a charitable institution on the road to Somnath.
- Ajayaraja II (alias Salhana) defeated the Muslims as well as Sulhana, the king of Malwa. He filled the world with silver coins, and his queen Somalekha was used to freshly minted coins every day. The queen built a stepwell in front of a temple. Ajayaraja II established the town of Ajayameru (Ajmer), which was full of temples and rightly deserved to be called Meru. The poem goes on to eulogize Ajayameru. For example, it states that the legendary great cities like Lanka and Dvaraka were not fit even for the maidservants of Ajayameru.

=== Canto 6 ===
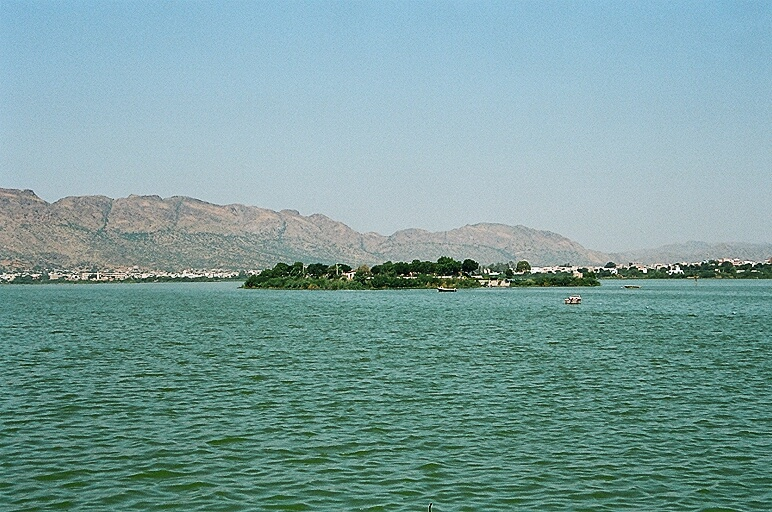
Ana Sagar, the lake commissioned by Arnoraja

Arnoraja defeated the Muslim invaders, many of whom were killed by the heroes of Ajayameru. To celebrate the victory, the king commissioned a lake, and filled it with the water of the Chandra river (now called Bandi river). He also built a Shiva temple, and named it after his father Ajayaraja (now called the Ajaypal Temple).

Arnoraja had two wives: Sudhava of Avichi (Marwar), and Kanchanadevi (the daughter of Jayasimha Siddharaja of Gujarat). Arnoraja and Sudhava had three sons, who were as different as the three gunas (qualities). Of these, Vigraharaja IV was like the sattva guna (good qualities). The eldest son (Jagaddeva, not named in the text) rendered the same service to Arnoraja as Bhrigu's son did to his mother (that is, killed his parent). This son went out like a wick, leaving behind an evil smell.

Someshvara was the son of Arnoraja and Kanchandevi. Astrologers predicted that Someshvara's son (that is, Prithviraja III) would be an incarnation of the legendary divine hero Rama. Therefore, Jayasimha took Someshvara to his own court in Gujarat.

The poem then describes the legendary lunar dynasty, including Soma, Budha, Paurava and Bharata as its members. A portion of the manuscript is missing after these verses. Next, the poem describes the legendary king Kartavirya, and states that the Kalachuris of Tripuri (the family of Prithviraja's mother) were descended from him through one Sahasikh ("courageous").

=== Canto 7 ===
The poem states that Jayasimha Siddharaja (the maternal grandfather of Prithviraja III) was an incarnation of Shiva's devotee Kumbodhar. His successor Kumarapala (literally "protector of a child") kept a young Someshvara close to himself, and thus became worthy of his name. When Someshvara grew up, he beheaded the king of Konkana during Kumarapala's invasion of that region. Someshvara married Karpura-devi, the princess of Tripuri.

The text then states that Prithviraja was born on the 12th day of the jyeshtha month. It states the planetary positions at the time of his birth, although some portions are missing from the only available manuscript.

=== Canto 8 ===
The birth of Prithviraja was celebrated with many festivities. A wet nurse was appointed for his care. To protect him, a tiger's claw and images of Vishnu's ten incarnations were attached to his necklace. The queen became pregnant again, and gave birth to Hariraja in the Magha month.

Vigraharaja IV died a happy man after hearing that the earth had been blessed with the two sons of his brother. The phrase "the friend of poets" disappeared with his death. His unmarried son Aparagangeya also died. Prithvibhata, the son of Sudhava's eldest son, also departed, as if to bring back Vigraharaja. The males were dropping like pearls from the line of Sudhava. Lakshmi (the goddess of fortune) left Sudhava's lineage, and wished to see Someshvara (Prithviraja's father). Therefore, the Chahamana ministers brought Someshvara to Sapadalaksha (the Chahamana country).

Someshvara and Karpura-devi came to Ajayameru with their two sons, Prithviraja and Hariraja. Someshvara became the new Chahamana king, and established a new town where the palaces of Vigraharaja were located. He named this new town after his father Arnoraja, to remove the blot left by killing of Arnoraja by his eldest son.

In Ajayameru, Vigraharaja had constructed as many temples as the hill forts he had conquered. In the middle of these temples, Someshvara erected the Vaidyanath (Shiva) temple, which was taller than all of Vigraharaja's temples. He installed images of Brahma, Vishnu and Shiva in this temple. He also placed effigies of his father and himself riding horses in the temple premises. Just like Meru had five Kalpavrikshas, Someshvara built five temples in Ajayameru. He built so many temples at other places, that the population of city of gods declined.

Someshvara appointed the Queen to protect his young son, and then departed to be with his father in the heaven. All his predecessors, from Chahamana to Prithvibhata came to welcome him, except Arnoraja's eldest son, who was hiding in the hell.

=== Canto 9 ===
During Karpura-devi's regency, the (Ajayameru) city was so densely populated and had so many man-made structures that the sun was not able to see more than a tenth of the land. Prithviraja's minister Kadamba-Vasa served him as Hanuman served Rama. He sent the armies in all the directions to add to the glory of the young king.

All branches of learning united and came to Prithviraja, and he became knowledgeable about all the arts and sciences that a king should be proficient in. Kamadeva took service with him to learn archery, and to stop living in fear of Shiva.

Prithviraja and his brother Hariraja were like Rama and Lakshmana. Prithviraja's maternal relative Bhuvanaika-Malla came to him to find out how he was able to protect the earth with only two arms. Bhuvanaika-Malla was an audacious warrior, and gave away all his wealth in charity. He wanted to raid the South, but decided against doing that because the respected sage Agastya lived there. An incarnation of Garuda, he served the two brothers loyally, and subdued the Nagas.

With support of Kadamba-Vasa and Bhuvanaika-Malla, Prithviraja did many things for the welfare of his people.

=== Canto 10 ===
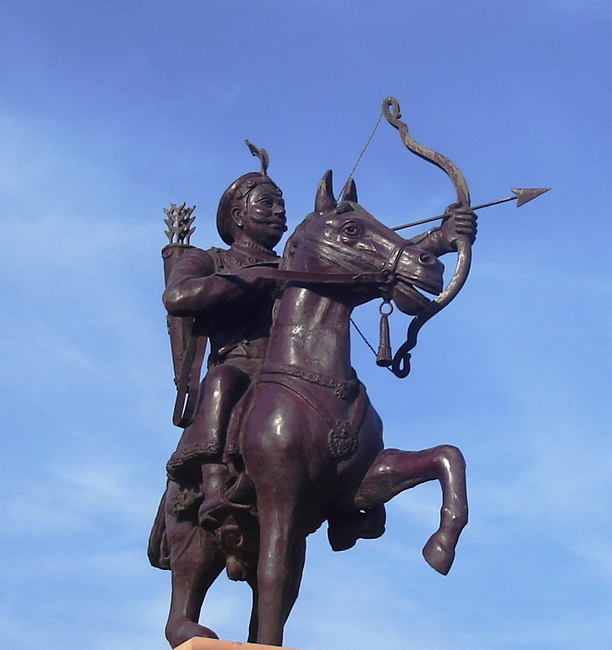
A statue of Prithviraja III

When Prithviraja became an adult, many princesses expressed their desire to marry him. His good fortune also presented him with many opportunities to wage wars. When Vigraharaja's son Nagarjuna conquered Gudapura, Prithviraja led an army against him and besieged the Gudapura fort. Nagarjuna relinquished the duty of a warrior, and fled from the fort. Prithviraja killed his warriors and captured the fort. He brought Nagarjuna's wife and mother to Ajmer, and placed the heads of his enemies on the Ajmer fort's battlements.

A beef-eating mlechchha named Ghori had captured Garjani in the North-West, where horses abound. His envoy was a bald man with the complexion of a leper, and spoke like wild birds. When he heard that Prithviraja had vowed to destroy the mlechchhas, he sent an ambassador to the Chahamana capital. Rajas (feudatory kings) took shelter in their fortresses in his fear. When he captured Naddula, Prithviraja became angry and vowed to subdue him.

=== Canto 11 ===
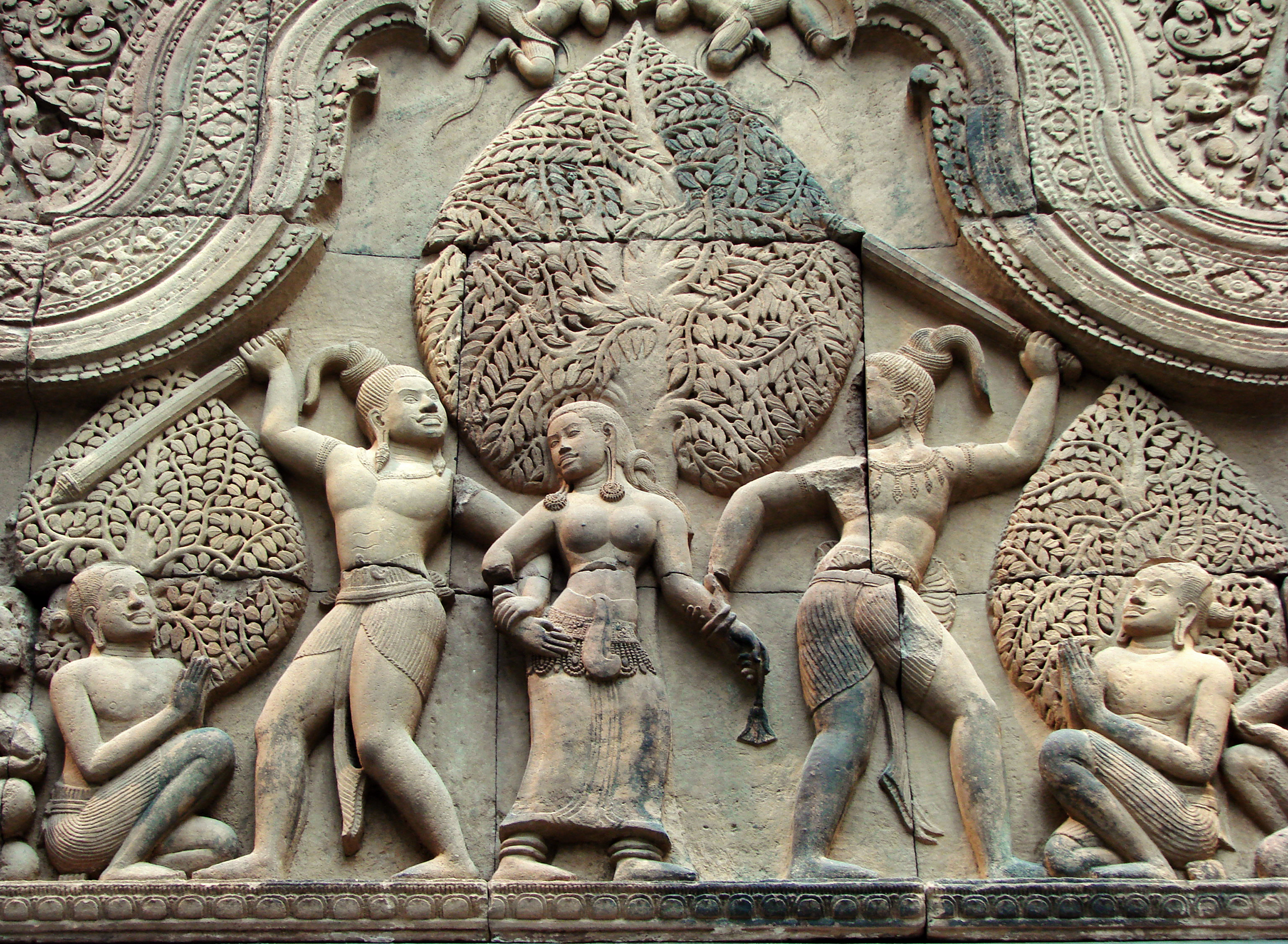
Sunda and Upasunda fight over Tilottama

Prithviraja's minister Kadamba-Vasa advised him not to get angry and not to fight with Ghori. He said that the enemies will destroy themselves, just like Sunda and Upasunda ruined themselves over Tilottama. Just then, a messenger from Gujarat arrived and informed Prithviraja that the king of Gujarat had defeated Ghori's forces. Prithvibhatta, the chief of the poets, praised Kadambavasa as Ghori had been defeated without any effort from the Chahamana side. He then narrated the story of Tilottama. Prithviraja dismissed the messenger after bestowing gifts upon him.

Prithviraja then visited his gallery, where Prithvbhatta showed him illustrations from the Ramayana, and narrated the king's deeds in his previous birth as Rama. The king then saw a portrait of Tilottama, and Kamadeva (the god of love) overpowered him. Prithviraja began to long for Tilottama, and left the gallery at noon, wounded by the arrows of Kamadeva.

=== Canto 12 ===
As Prithviraja came out of the gallery, he heard someone reciting a verse. The verse declared that a person who strives to get something gets it. Prithviraja asked Padmanabha (a minister of the former king Vigraharaja) who the reciter is. Padmanabha introduced the reciter as Jayanaka, a great poet-scholar from Kashmir, the seat of learning. Jayanaka explained that he came from Kashmir to Ajayameru, because the goddess of learning had asked him to serve the incarnation of Vishnu: Prithviraja.

The only extant manuscript of the text ends abruptly in the twelfth chapter. It is thus incomplete, but it mentions the victory of Prithviraja over Ghori in the first Battle of Tarain.

== Historical reliability ==
Having been written at the court of Prithviraja, the text is one of the most important sources of information about the Chahamana dynasty.

According to Har Bilas Sarda, the historical accuracy of the poem's narrative is supported by historical inscriptions, as well as Jonaraja's commentary on it. For example, the genealogy of the Chahamana dynasty given in the text is nearly same as the one provided by the 1170 CE Bijolia inscription. There are only minor differences; for example, the Bijolia inscription has:

- Guvaka instead of Govindaraja I (Guvaka being a diminutive of Govinda)
- Shashi-nripa instead of Chandraraja (the two words are synonyms)
- Vappyaraja instead of Vakpatiraja (variants)
- Gandu instead of Govindaraja III (a diminutive)

Sarda called Prithviraja Vijaya the most reliable literary work on the early history of the dynasty. Historian E. Sreedharan, on the other hand, described the text "an outrageous distortion of history" for its "Ramayanaization". He criticized the text for its characterization of Prithviraja as the divine incarnation of Rama. According to historian R. B. Singh of Gorakhpur University, the text "suffers from literary embellishments", but "its contents find full confirmation from the epigraphic evidence".

== See also ==
- Hammira Mahakavya
