= Guvaka =

Guvaka may refer to any of the following Indian kings:

- Guvaka I
- Guvaka II
