= Vakpatiraja I =

King of Sapadalaksha from 917 to 944

- Maharaja

King of Sapadalaksha
- Reign: c. 917–944 CE
- Predecessor: Chandanaraja
- Successor: Simharaja
- Issue: Simharaja, Lakshmana and Vatsaraja
- Dynasty: Chahamanas of Shakambhari
- Father: Govindaraja II
- Mother: Rudrani

Vakpatiraja I (reigned c. 917–944 CE), also known as Vappayaraja, was an Indian king belonging to the Shakambhari Chahamana dynasty. He ruled the Sapadalaksha country, which included parts of present-day Rajasthan in north-western India. He appears to have made an attempt to throw off the Gurjara-Pratihara overlordship, and was the first Chahamana king to assume the title Maharaja.

== Early life ==
Vakpati was the son and successor of the Chahamana king Chandanaraja (alias Guvaka II) and queen Rudrani. His aliases include Vappayaraja and Manika Rai.

== Reign ==
Vakpati's predecessors were feudatories of the Gurjara-Pratiharas, who had been weakened by Rashtrakuta invasions from the south. The Prithviraja Vijaya claims that Vakpati achieved 188 military victories. This may be an exaggeration, but it is possible that Vakpati participated in a large number of battles in the chaotic conditions resulting from Pratihara-Rashtrakuta conflict.

The Rashtrakuta invasion probably weakened the Pratiharas' hold on vassals like Vakpati. According to the Harsha stone inscription, he assumed the title Maharaja. He was the first Chahamana king to do so, and this probably indicates that he tried to gain independence from the Pratiharas.

After the Rashtrakutas left, the Pratiharas probably tried to re-assert their authority. The Harsha inscription states that a tantrapala (provincial governor) attacked the Ananta region in the Chahamana territory. The tantrapala was very haughty because of the authority he held from his overlord, but his elephant force was defeated by Vakpati's cavalry. He might have been a general sent by the Pratihara emperor Mahipala I to subdue Vakpati. According to Dasharatha Sharma, his name was Kshamapala. R. B. Singh identifies him with Madhava, a Tomara feudatory of Mahipala.

== Legacy ==
Vakpati had at least three sons including Simharaja, Lakshmana and Vatsaraja. He was succeeded by Simharaja on the Shakambhari throne, while Lakshmana established another branch of the dynasty at Naddula (Nadol). Vatsaraja is known as the donor of Kardamakakhata village to the Harshanatha temple. The Bijolia inscription places one Vindhyanṛpati (or Vindhyaraja) between Vakpati and Simharaja. According to historian Dasharatha Sharma, Vindhyanṛpati was probably an elder brother of Simharaja and had a very short reign. However, R. B. Singh theorized that it was a title of Vakpati, who probably acquired it by conquering the Vindhyavati region (around modern Bijolia).

Vakpati appears to have been a Shaivite. The Prithviraja Vijaya states that he built a temple dedicated to Vomkesha (Shiva) at Pushkar.
