= Govindarajan =

Govindarajan may refer to

- C. Govindarajan, Indian politician
- Durai Govindarajan, Indian politician
- Govindarajan Padmanabhan, Indian biochemist
- Sirkazhi Govindarajan, Indian Carnatic musician
- Mirudhubashini Govindarajan, Indian women's health care and infertility expert
- Vijay Govindarajan (born 1949), Indian professor

== See also ==
- Govindaraja (disambiguation)
