= Chandraraja =

Chandraraja may refer to:

- Chandraraja I (r. c. 759-751 CE), Shakambhari Chahamana king of India
- Chandraraja II (r. c. 836-863 CE), Shakambhari Chahamana king of India

== See also ==
- Chandra (disambiguation)
- Raja (disambiguation)
