= Sri Ramakrishna Hospital =

Hospital in Tamil Nadu, India

- Sri Ramakrishna Hospital
- Formation: 1975
- Type: Private
- Location: Coimbatore, Tamil Nadu, 641044, India
- Coordinates: 11.0228°N 76.9778°E
- Services: Hospitals, pharmacy, diagnostic centre
- Key people: Shri.Sundar Ramakrishnan (Managing Trustee); Shri. Narendran Soundararaj (Joint Managing Trustee)
- Website: sriramakrishnahospital.com

Sri Ramakrishna Hospital is a 1000-bedded multi-specialty hospital located in Coimbatore, Tamil Nadu. The hospital was started in 1975. Sri Ramakrishna Hospital was established and is run by the SNR Sons Trust that was founded in the year 1970 by Mr. R. Doraiswamy Naidu (RD) and Sevaratna Dr. R. Venkatesalu, sons of Sri. S.N. Rangasamy Naidu. The trust successfully runs 15 organizations that caters to the social causes of society primarily focusing on Health Care, Education and Service.

Sevaratna Dr. R. Venkatesalu (RV) and Mr. R. Doraiswamy Naidu (RD) single-handedly established the Ramakrishna group and the SNR and sons trust on the land owned by his family. RV's wife late Mrs. Velumani ammal, daughter of PSG Ganga Naidu, played a pivotal role in the creation of the trust.

This hospital is accredited by NABH (National Accreditation Board for Hospitals & Healthcare Providers). The hospital was among the pioneers of cardiology, cancer treatment, IVF, kidney transplantation, neurology among others in the Kongu Region performing these procedures for the first time in Tamil Nadu.

== Facilities ==
The original hospital has 1000 beds with trained staff offering advanced treatments and procedures ranging from advanced neurosurgery to chemotherapy to stem cell transplantation to organ transplants.

== Online consultation ==
Sri Ramakrishna Hospital has online doctor consultations with all the doctors, it enabled people to connect with the doctors during COVID-19. A range of doctors from various major and minor departments are available online to answer the patient's health concerns.

== Laboratory services ==
Sri Ramakrishna Hospital is equipped with diagnostic equipment for various departments including clinical pathology, clinical biochemistry and endocrinology, microbiology, and much more. The hospital has installed a CT scan machine(the first of its kind in Asia).

The laboratory facilities are also used to facilitate and enhance the many teaching programs conducted by the hospital.

== See also ==
- Sri Ramakrishna Engineering College
- Sri Ramakrishna College of Arts and Science
- List of Hospitals in India
- Mirudhubashini Govindarajan
- Avarampalayam
