= Avarampalayam =

Coimbatore, Tamil Nadu, India

- neighbourhood
- Location in Tamil Nadu, India
- Coordinates: 11.1°N 77.0°E
- Country: India
- State: Tamil Nadu
- District: Coimbatore
- Elevation: 1,319 m (4,327 ft)

Languages
  - Official: Tamil
- Time zone: UTC+5:30 (IST)
- PIN: 641006
- Telephone code: 91-422
- Vehicle registration: TN-66

Avarampalayam is a part of the Coimbatore city. It is near Peelamedu, Nava India, Ganapathy. It houses the large number of foundries and motor / pump industries. It is one of the head place of small scale industries & medium scale industries in Coimbatore. It played a major role for industrial revolution in Coimbatore.It has many small scale foundries and large number of small-scale industries & also some medium scale industries.

The nearest neighbourhood to Avarampalayam is Gandhipuram. There is dedicated town bus service (bus number 'A1') and share-auto services available from Gandhipuram to Avarampalayam.

The centre of Avarampalayam could be called the triangular road that has the bus stop, temple and library on each side, There is a weekly market that happens every Wednesday evening. Once that used to be the day of weekly purchase for all folks living in Avarampalayam and surrounding area. These days it still continues to be very active even after the supermarkets have become fashionable.

== Temples ==
- Sri Radha-Rukmani-Venugopalaswamy Temple (Perumal Kovil)
- Sri Lingammal Narrappa naidu temple
- Bannari Mariamman Kovil
- Murugan Kovil
- Karuvalur Mariamman Temple
- Rangammal Kovil
- Pattathu Arasi Amman Kovil
- Sri Sirkali Mariamman Temple

Among the temples the most significant or popular one is Bannari Mariamman Temple. The Annual festival called Kundam also known as Poomethi is performed by the Month of march every year. This is the famous festival performed in the city.

== Educational Institutions in Avarampalayam ==
- S.N.R. Sons College.
- Sri Ramakrishna Matriculation Higher Secondary School
- Sri Ramakrishna College of Pharmacy
- Sri Ramakrishna College of Arts and Science for Women
- Sri Ramakrishna College of Physiotherapy
- Sri Ramakrishna Dental College & Hospital
- Sri Ramakrishna College of Nursing.
- Sri Ramakrishna Institute of Paramedical Sciences
- Sri Ramakrishna Hospital
- Sri Ramakrishna Kalayana Mandapam
- ABC Matriculation School.
- OLogy Tech School Velammal
- Vivekananda Vidyalaya Matriculation school.
