= Govindaraja II =

King of Sapadalaksha from 863 to 890

King of Sapadalaksha
- Reign: c. 863–890 CE
- Predecessor: Chandraraja II
- Successor: Chandanaraja
- Spouse: Rudrani
- Issue: Chandanaraja, Vakpatiraja I
- Dynasty: Chahamanas of Shakambhari
- Father: Chandraraja II

Govindaraja II (r. c. 863–890 CE), also known as Guvaka II, was an Indian king from the Shakambhari Chahamana dynasty. He ruled parts of present-day Rajasthan in north-western India as a Gurjara-Pratihara vassal.

Govinda-raja II ascended the Chahamana throne after his father Chandraraja II. The Harsha stone inscription describes Govinda II as a warrior as great as his grandfather Govinda I.

The Prithviraja Vijaya states that 12 kings wanted to marry Govinda's sister Kalavati, but he defeated them, and gave his sister in marriage to the emperor of Kanyakubja. This ruler of Kannauj is identified with the Pratihara emperor Bhoja I.

Govinda II was succeeded by his son Chandanaraja.
