= Chandanaraja =

King of Sapadalaksha from 890 to 917

King of Sapadalaksha
- Reign: c. 890–917 CE
- Predecessor: Govindaraja II
- Successor: Vakpatiraja I
- Dynasty: Chahamanas of Shakambhari
- Father: Govindaraja II

Chandanaraja (r. c. 890–917 CE) was an Indian king belonging to the Shakambhari Chahamana dynasty. He ruled parts of present-day Rajasthan in north-western India.

Chandana-raja succeeded his father Guvaka II as the Chahamana king. He is also known as Vappayaraja and Manika Rai.

According to the Harsha stone inscription, Chandana defeated a Tomara ruler named Rudra (or Rudrena). Dasharatha Sharma identifies this ruler with a king of Delhi's Tomara dynasty. Historian R. B. Singh theorizes that Rudra was another name of the Tomara ruler Chandrapala or Bibasapala.

The Prithviraja Vijaya states that Chandana's queen Rudrani was also known as "Atma-Prabha" because of her yogic powers. She is said to have set up 1,000 lamp-like lingams on the banks of the Pushkar lake.
