= Mirudhubashini Govindarajan =

Indian surgeon

Mirudhubashini Govindarajan is an Indian gynaecologist and fertility specialist based in Coimbatore, Tamil Nadu. Her work includes infertility management and reproductive medicine.

== Early life and education ==
Govindarajan was born in Coimbatore, Tamil Nadu. She completed her Bachelor of Medicine and Bachelor of Surgery (MBBS) at Stanley Medical College and Hospital in Chennai in 1970. She subsequently undertook postgraduate training at the University of Manitoba in Canada and became a fellow of the Royal College of Surgeons of Canada in 1977. She also received training in colposcopy and gynaecological endoscopy in Germany, as well as in infertility management in Singapore.

== Career ==
Govindarajan returned to India in 1981 and joined Sri Ramakrishna Hospital in Coimbatore, where she established the department of obstetrics and gynaecology and served its head until 2010. She was clinical director of Women's Center from 1982 to 2015 and of its Assisted Reproductive Technology (ART) centre from 1994 to 2015.

Her work has focused on women's healthcare, infertility management and assisted reproductive technology. She has been associated with the development of fertility services in Coimbatore, including the use of assisted reproductive techniques. Her professional record lists milestones involving frozen embryo transfer, oocyte donation and frozen blastocyst transfer between 2001 and 2004.

In 2018, Govindarajan delivered the Dr. Subhas Mukherjee Memorial Lecture organised by the Bengal Obstetric and Gynaecological Society in Kolkata. Her lecture addressed infertility management in patients with adenomyosis and fibroids.

== Professional appointments ==
- Clinical Director of the Women's Center, Coimbatore.
- Clinical Director of the Assisted Reproductive Technology Center, Coimbatore.
- Director of Center for Perinatal Care Pvt Ltd.
- Director of Women's Center and Hospitals Private Limited.
- Former Adjunct Professor at The Tamil Nadu Dr. MGR Medical University.

== Research and publications ==
- 2004 – Inheritance of Infertility.
- 2016 – Heavy menstrual bleeding and dysmenorrhea are improved by Magnetic Resonance Guided Focused Ultrasound Surgery (MRgFUS) of adenomyosis.
- 2019 – Diagnosis, management and care of hypertensive disorders of pregnancy (HDP): An Indian Expert Opinion.
- 2020 – Male age is associated with sperm DNA/chromatin integrity.
- 2021 – Effect of age on semen parameters.
- 2022 – A comparison between the Felix electrophoretic system of sperm isolation and conventional density gradient centrifugation: a multicentre analysis.
- 2023 – Factors affecting the distribution of serum anti-müllerian hormone levels among infertile Asian women: a multi-nation, multi-centre, and multi-ethnicity prospective cohort study.
- 2023 – First Recorded Normal Live Birth After ICSI with Electrophoretically Isolated Spermatozoa Using the Felix System.
- 2024 – First Recorded Normal Live Birth After ICSI with Electrophoretically Isolated Spermatozoa Using the Felix™ System – Fertility & Reproduction.

== Memberships ==
- Indian Medical Association
- Coimbatore Obstetrics and Gynecology Society - President, 2002-2003
- Federation Gynecological and Obstetrics Societies of India
- Indian Association of Cytologists
- Perinatal Committee-FOGSI
- European Society of Human Reproduction and Embryology
- American Society of Reproductive Medicine
- Member, Editorial Board international Journal of Obstetrics and Gynecology, published in New Zealand
- Founder President Coimbatore Ultrasound Society

== Awards and honours ==
Fellowship of the Indian College of Reproductive Medicine (ICRM), 2024.
