= Prithviraja II =

King of Sapadalaksha
- Reign: c. 1165–1169 CE
- Predecessor: Aparagangeya
- Successor: Someshvara
- Dynasty: Chahamanas of Shakambhari

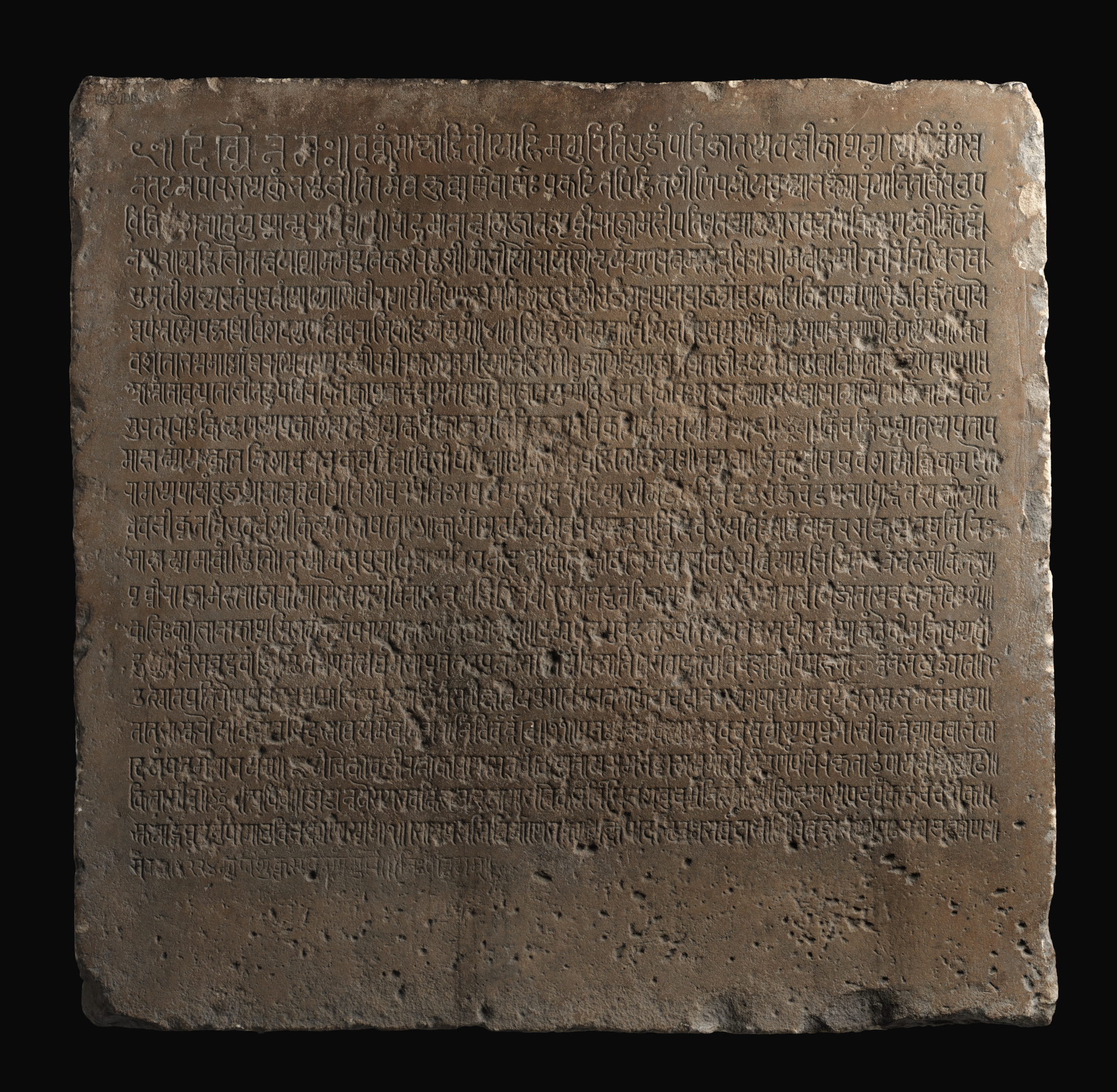
A sandstone slab with an inscription in Sanskrit

Prithvirāja II (r. c. 1165–1169 CE) was an Indian king from the Chauhan dynasty. He ruled parts of north-western India, including present-day Rajasthan. He is also known by other names, including Prithvi-bhatta, Prithvi-deva and Pethad-deva.

== Early life ==
Prithviraja was a son of the Chahamana king Jagaddeva. The rule of Jagaddeva was followed by that of his brother Vigraharaja IV, and then Vigraharaja's son Aparagangeya. According to an inscription found at the Ruthi Rani temple at Dhod, Prithviraja defeated the king of Shakambhari. This indicates that Prithviraja de-throned Aparagangeya, and became the Chahamana king.

== Reign ==
Prithviraja appears to have faced Muslim invasions from the west. According to the 1168 CE Hansi stone inscription, he assigned his maternal uncle Kilhana as the in-charge of the Asika Fort (modern Hansi), anxious to save it from Hammira (Emir). The "Hammira" can be identified with Ghaznavid king Khusrau Malik, who controlled Lahore at the time.

The Hansi inscription also states that Kilhana burnt a town called Panchapura. Dasharatha Sharma identifies Panchapura with modern Panjaur. The ruler of Panchapura accepted Prithviraja's suzerainty, and surrendered to him an expensive pearl necklace.

The Bijolia rock inscription states that Prithviraja secured an elephant named Manahsiddhikari from a ruler named Vasantapala. Dasharatha Sharma identifies this Vasantapala with a king mentioned in the play Lalita-Vigraharaja-Nataka. According to this play, Vasantapala was the father of Vigraharaja's lover Desaladevi. Sharma theorizes that Aparagangeya was Desaladevi's son. Thus, Vasantapala was probably an enemy of Prithviraja, and was subdued by him.

Prithviraja probably died heirless, because of which he was succeeded by his uncle Someshvara.

== Religion ==
Prithviraja's queen was Suhavadevi or Sudhava. Both were devout Shaivites. Prithviraja gifted villages and precious metals (including gold) to Brahmins. He also granted the Morajhari village to the Parshvanatha Jain temple at Bijolia.

== Inscriptions ==
Find-spots of Prithviraja II's inscriptions

Inscriptions dated to Prithviraja's reign have been found at following places:

- Hansi, 1167 CE (1224 VS)
- Dhod, 1168 CE (1225 VS)
- Menal, 1168 CE (1225 VS) and 1169 CE (1226 VS)
