= Amaragangeya =

King of Shakambhari
- Reign: c. 1164–1165 CE
- Predecessor: Vigraharaja IV
- Successor: Prithviraja II
- Dynasty: Chahamanas of Shakambhari

Amaragangeya (r. c. 1164–1165 CE), also known as Aparagangeya, was an Indian king from the Chahamana dynasty. He ruled parts of north-western India, including present-day Rajasthan.

Amaragangeya was a son of the Chahamana king Vigraharaja IV. He appears to have ascended the throne as a minor, and ruled for a very short period. He was succeeded by his paternal cousin Prithviraja II, who was a son of Vigraharaja's brother Jagaddeva. According to an inscription found at the Ruthi Rani temple at Dhod, Prithviraja defeated the king of Shakambhari. This indicates that Prithviraja de-throned Amaragangeya, and became the Chahamana king. According to the 15th-century Kashmiri historian Jonaraja, Amaragangeya died unmarried.
