= Govindaraja Temple =

Govindaraja Temple may refer to:

- Govindaraja Perumal Temple, a temple in Cuddalore, Tamil Nadu, India
- Govindaraja Temple, Tirupati, a temple in Tirupati, Andhra Pradesh, India
