= Chandraraja II =

King of Sapadalaksha from 836 to 863

King of Sapadalaksha
- Reign: c. 836–863 CE
- Predecessor: Govindaraja I
- Successor: Govindaraja II
- Dynasty: Chahamanas of Shakambhari

Chandra-raja II (r. c. 836–863 CE) was an Indian king from the Shakambhari Chahamana dynasty. He ruled parts of present-day Rajasthan in north-western India.

Chandra succeeded his father Govindaraja I (alias Guvaka I) on the Chahamana throne. The Bijolia inscription names Guvaka's successor as Shashi-nripa (IAST: Śaśinṛpa), which appears to be another name of Chandraraja II. Both the names - "Chandra-raja" and "Shashi-nripa" - literally mean "moon-king".

The Prithviraja Vijaya eulogizes Chandra using vague terms, but little concrete information is available about his reign. He was succeeded by his son Govindaraja II (alias Guvaka II).
