= Govindaraja I =

King of Sapadalaksha from 809 to 836

King of Sapadalaksha
- Reign: c. 809–836 CE
- Predecessor: Durlabharaja I
- Successor: Chandraraja II
- Dynasty: Chahamanas of Shakambhari

Govinda-raja (r. c. 809–836 CE), also known as Guvaka I, was an Indian king from the Shakambhari Chahamana dynasty. He ruled parts of present-day Rajasthan in north-western India as a vassal of the Gurjara-Pratihara emperor Nagabhata II.

According to Prithviraja Vijaya, Govinda-raja was the son and successor of the Chahamana king Durlabharaja I. However, the Bijolia and the Harsha inscriptions name Durlabharaja's successor as "Guvaka", which appears to be a vernacular variation of the name "Govinda".

The Harsha stone inscription suggests that Govinda was a vassal the king Nagavaloka, identified with the Pratihara emperor Nagabhata II. It states that he achieved fame as a warrior, but does not name any specific battles.

The construction of the Harshanatha temple dedicated to the dynasty's family deity was probably started by Govinda, although it achieved its complete form only during the reign of his successors. Govinda was succeeded by his son Chandraraja II.
