= Harshnath Temple =

Hindu temple in Rajasthan, India

- हर्षनाथ्
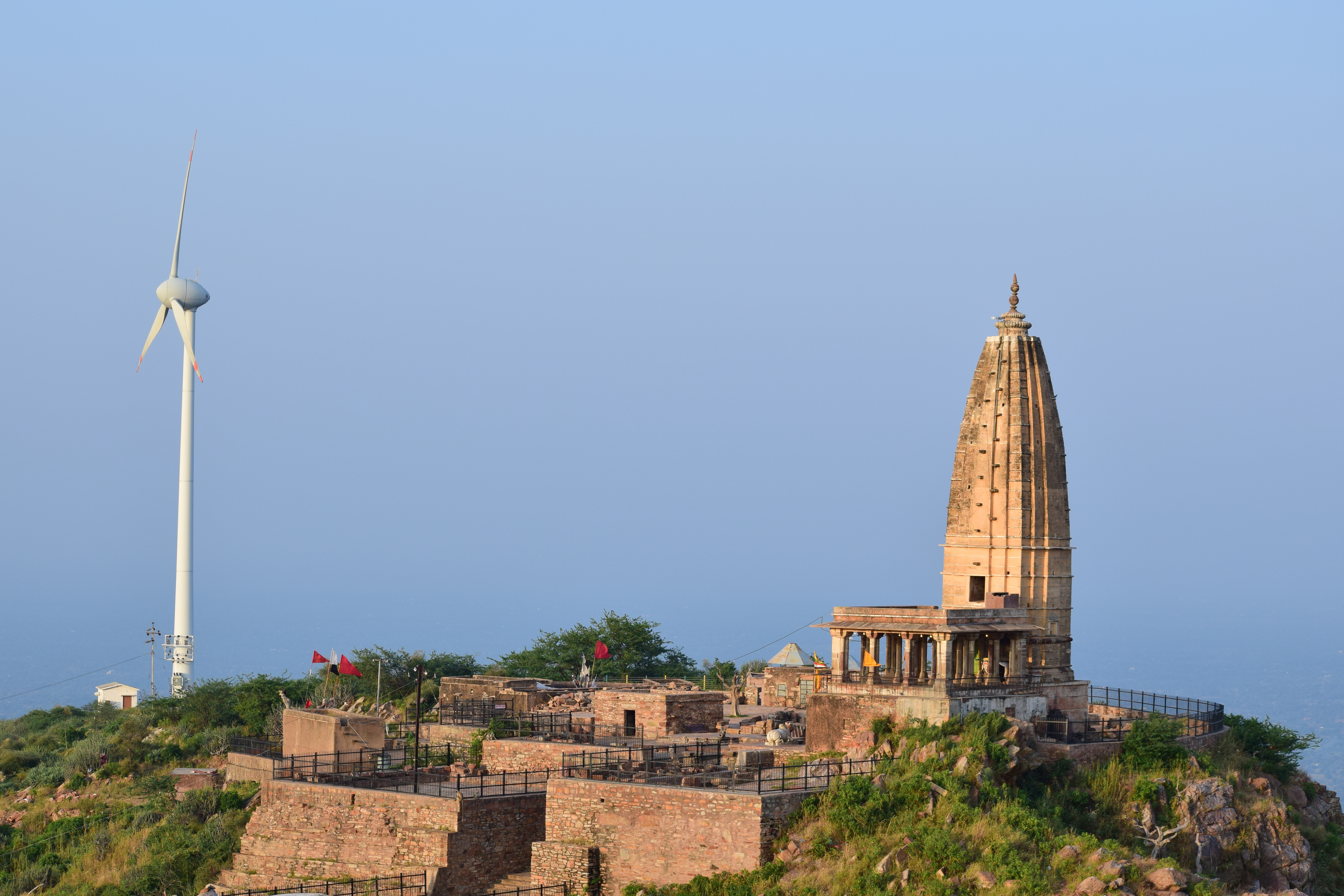

- Location of Harshnath temple in Rajasthan Harshnath Temple (India)

Religion
- Affiliation: Hinduism
- District: Sikar
- Deity: Shiva

Location
- Location: Harshnath
- State: Rajasthan
- Country: India
- Coordinates: 27.499914°N 75.172443°E

Architecture
- Completed: 956 CE
- Inscriptions: 973 CE
- Elevation: 900 m (2,953 ft)

Harshnath Temple (Sanskrit: हर्षनाथ् Harṣanātha) is a 10th-century Hindu temple, dedicated to Shiva, located on a prominent mountaintop in Sikar district of the Indian state of Rajasthan. It is located 14 km from the district headquarters at Sikar.

== History ==
This Shiva temple, according to an inscription dated 973 CE, was built by the Shaiva ascetic Bhavarakta, during the reign of the Chahamana king Vigraharaja I. It is surrounded by various shrines which lie in ruins.

Built atop an imposing mountain which was known at the time as Harṣa or Harṣagiri ("Mount Harṣa", or "the mountain of joy"), the Harshnath temple was originally dedicated to Shiva in his local form as Harṣa, "he who is full of joy", who resides on the mountain as its tutelary deity. The 973 inscription presents Harṣagiri as Shiva's second home, a terrestrial equivalent of his celestial home Mount Kailāsa, with Shiva's presence making the mountain into a sublimely beautiful place "like part of heaven" (i.e. svarga).

Harṣagiri was likely a regional religious centre even before the construction of the temple, which was completed in 956. The temple was commissioned by the Pāśupata religious leader Allaṭa (aka Bhāvarakta), who is stated to have been originally from this area, using money from pious donations. The ruling Chahamana dynasty, who also came from this region and who venerated Shiva-as-Harṣa as their family tutelary deity (kuladeva), were significant donors to the Harshnath temple, and they made it their main royal religious centre. Ordinary people were also important donors to the temple, and their donations are mentioned alongside those from the royal family.

Among the significant non-royal lay donors mentioned were salt merchants from the city of Śākambharī and horse traders from an unspecified place in the north. The salt trade was historically the most important economic activity in the region of Sapādalakṣa, where there were various salt lakes where salt could be harvested, and Śākambharī was the site of the largest of these salt lakes. Mount Harṣa itself was likely a junction on a major trade route leading north from Śākambharī to the major cities of northwestern India; in fact, this route continued south of Śākambharī to Ujjain, by way of Pushkar, and besides salt was generally an important route for the "transregional flow of goods". Harṣa's status as a prominent mountain, visible from far away, may have made it an important as a landmark and "point of convergence" for travellers on this route. As a result, the temple was able to attract pious donations from not only locals but also people from farther away.

After Allaṭa died in 970, his student Bhāvadyota continued to work on improvements to the temple, including "a courtyard, garden, well, and stone cistern to provide water for cattle".

In 1718, Shiv Singh constructed a new temple adjacent to the old temple using the ruins of the old temple.

Exactly same type of temple also situated at Harsh Village, Bilara Harsh Deval Temple, Dist Jodhpur, Rajasthan. Harsh Deval Temple at Bilara was also built in 10th century.

== Architecture ==
The temple and its surrounding shrines are now in ruins. The main temple faces east. Its pillars are intricately carved. On the inside west wall is carved a figure of standing Parvati [labelled Vikata] in panchagnitap along with her female attendants.

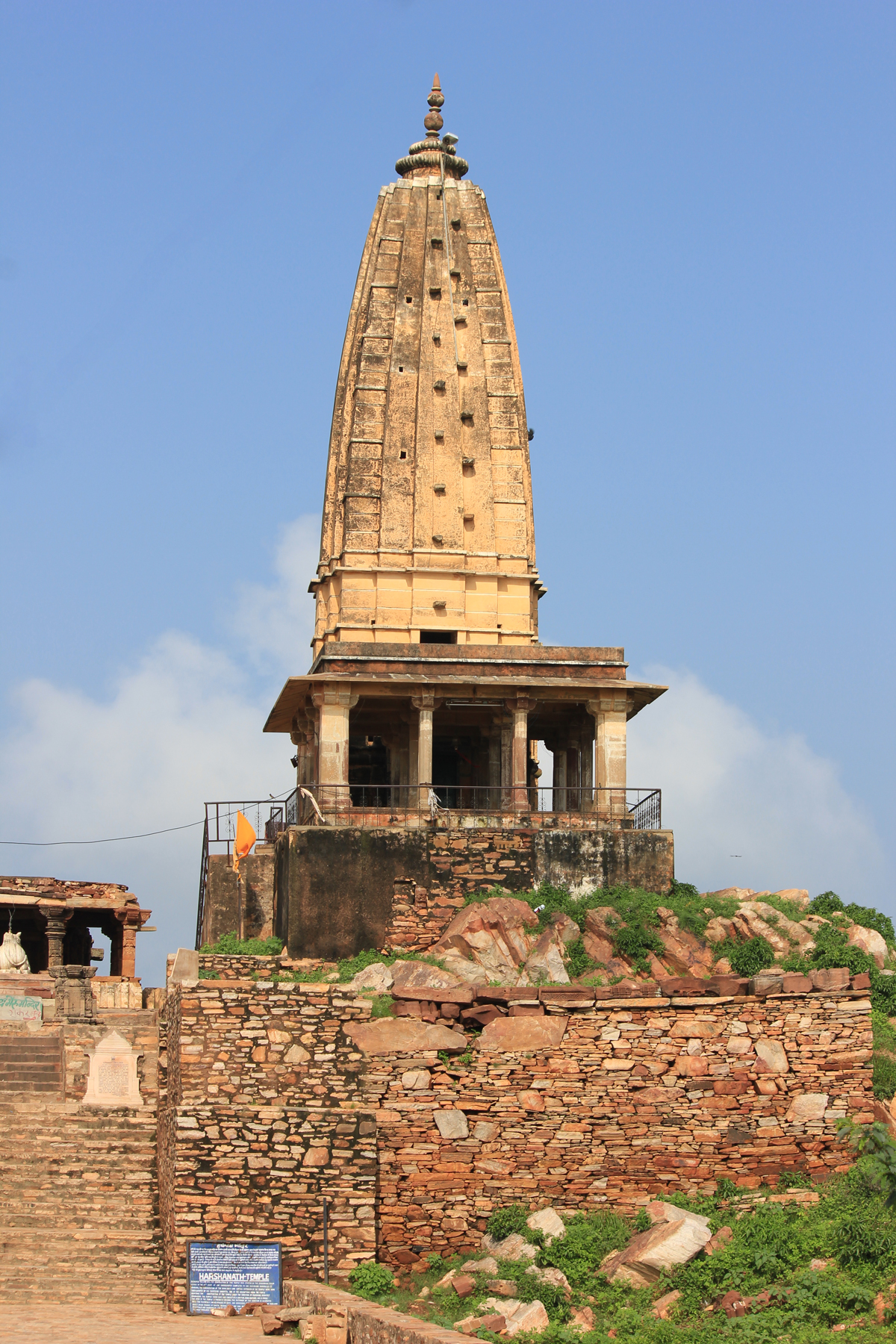
Outer view

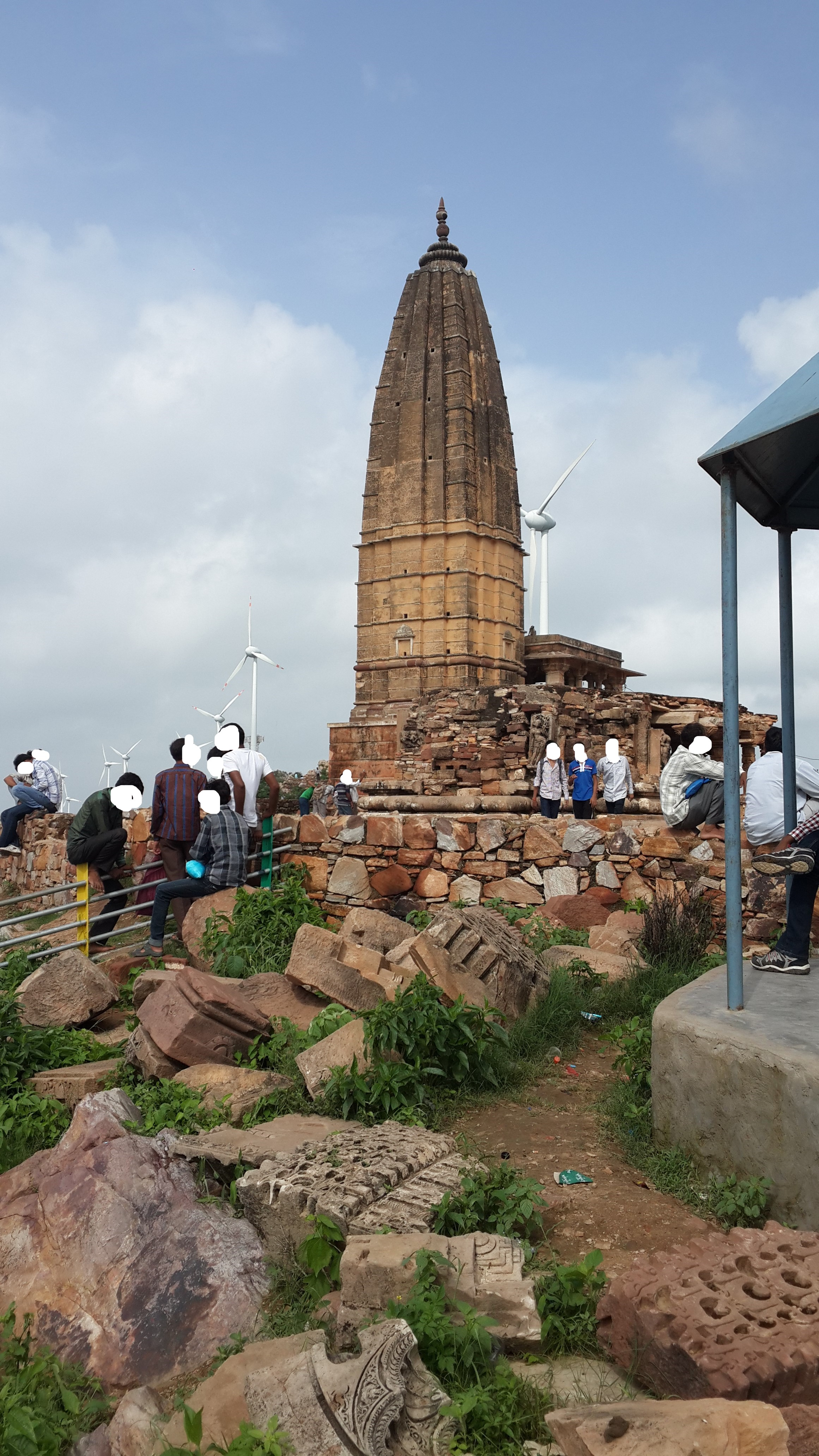
Temple View from Sunset Point

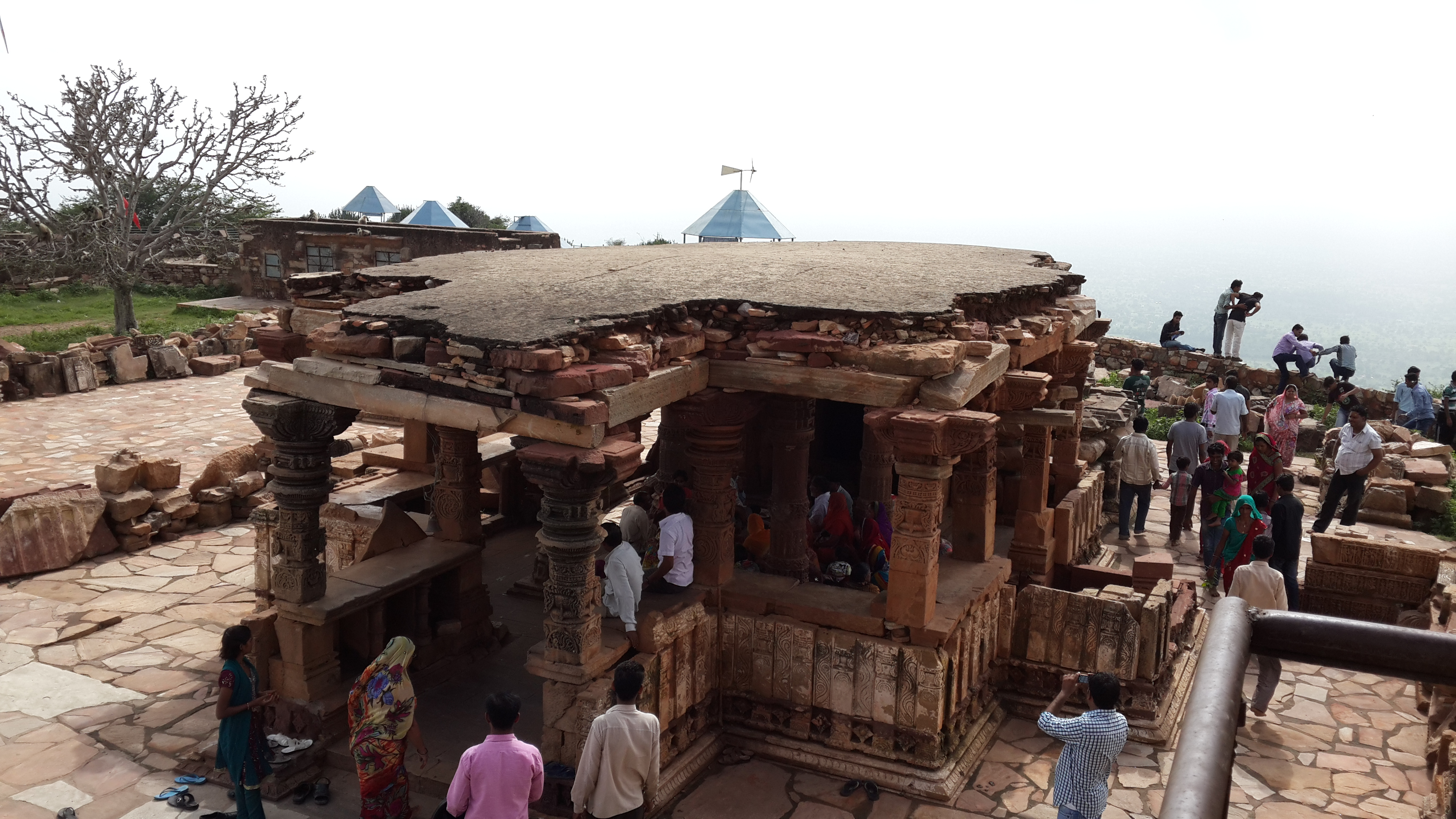
Destroyed section

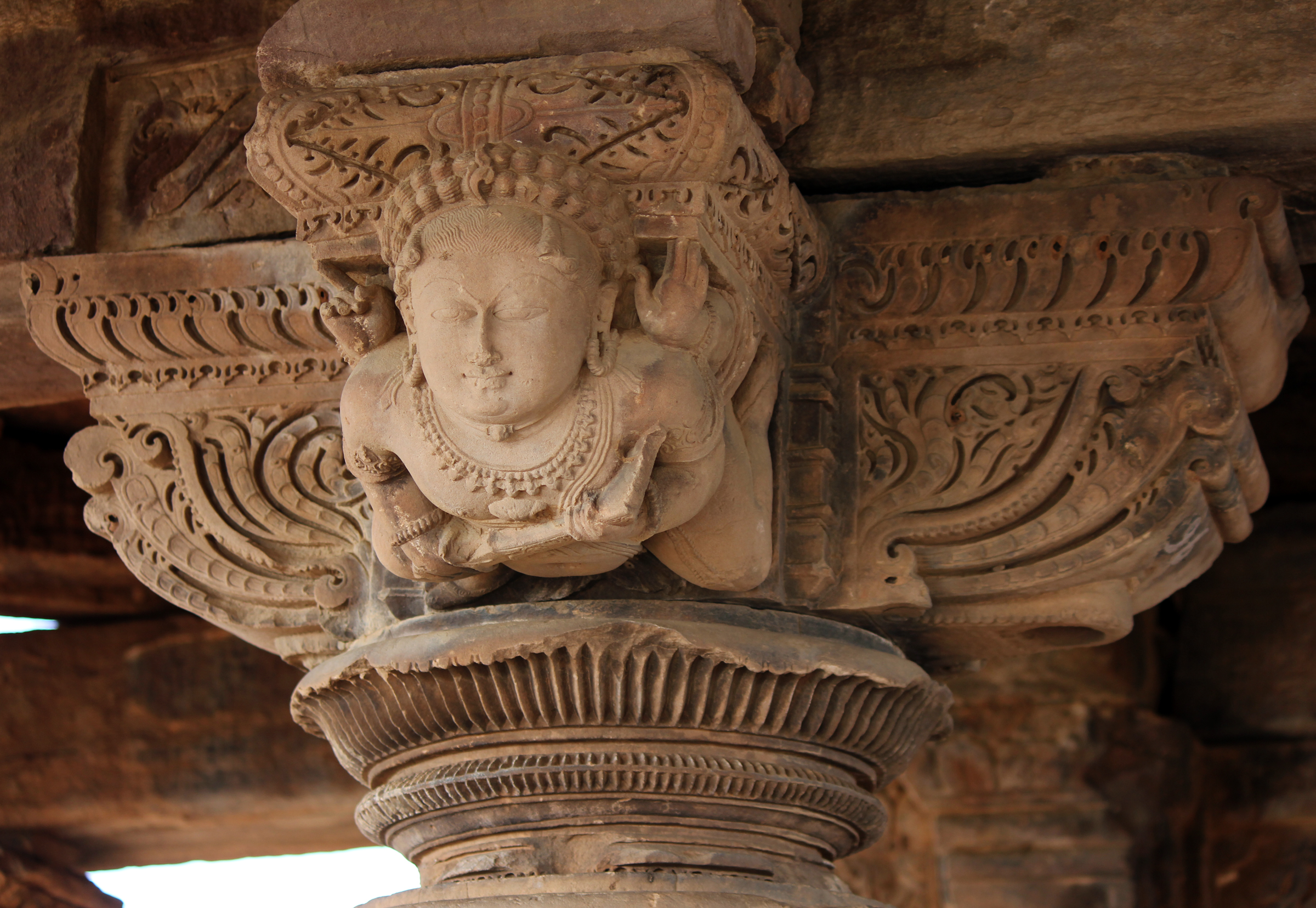
Sculptures

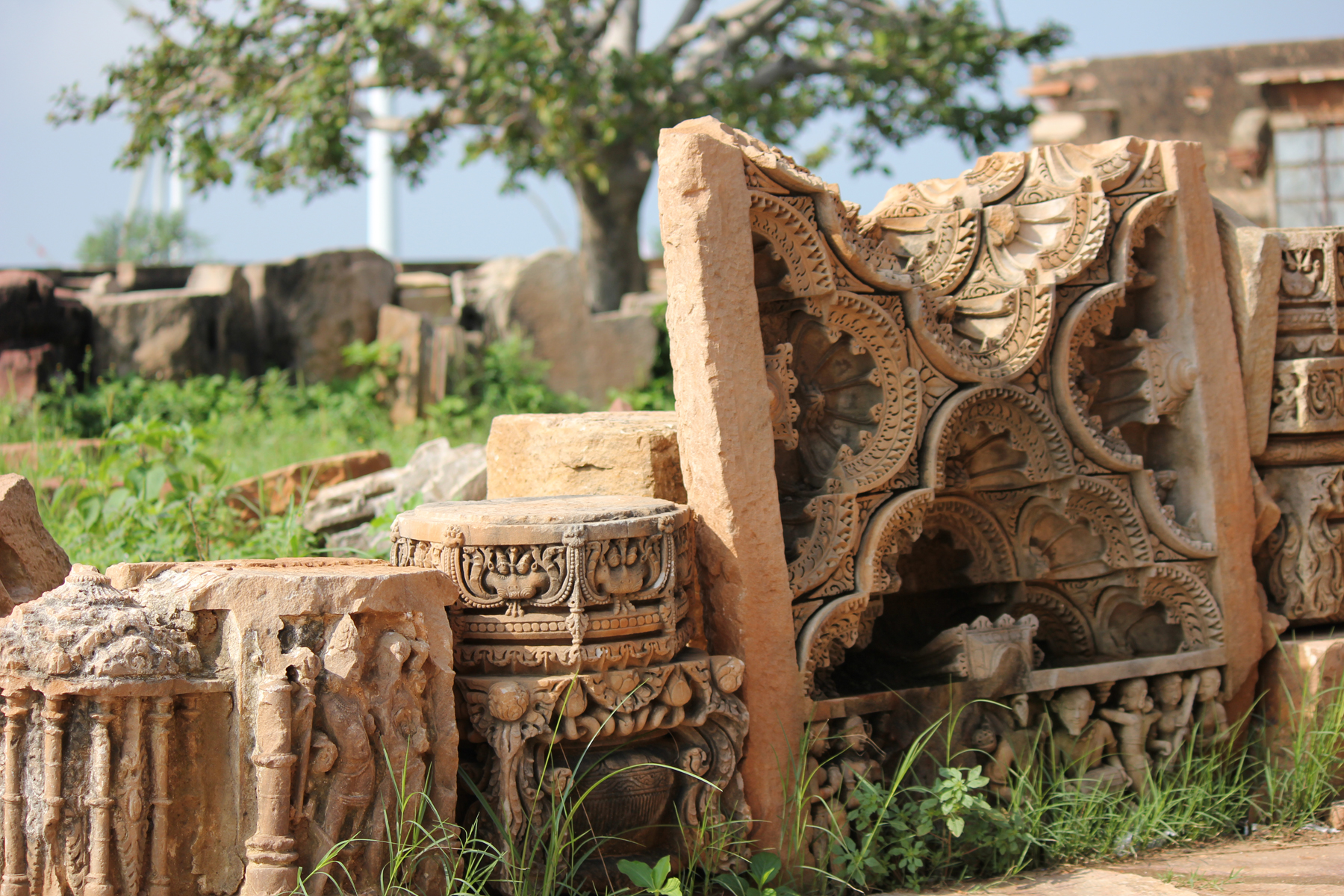
Broken pieces

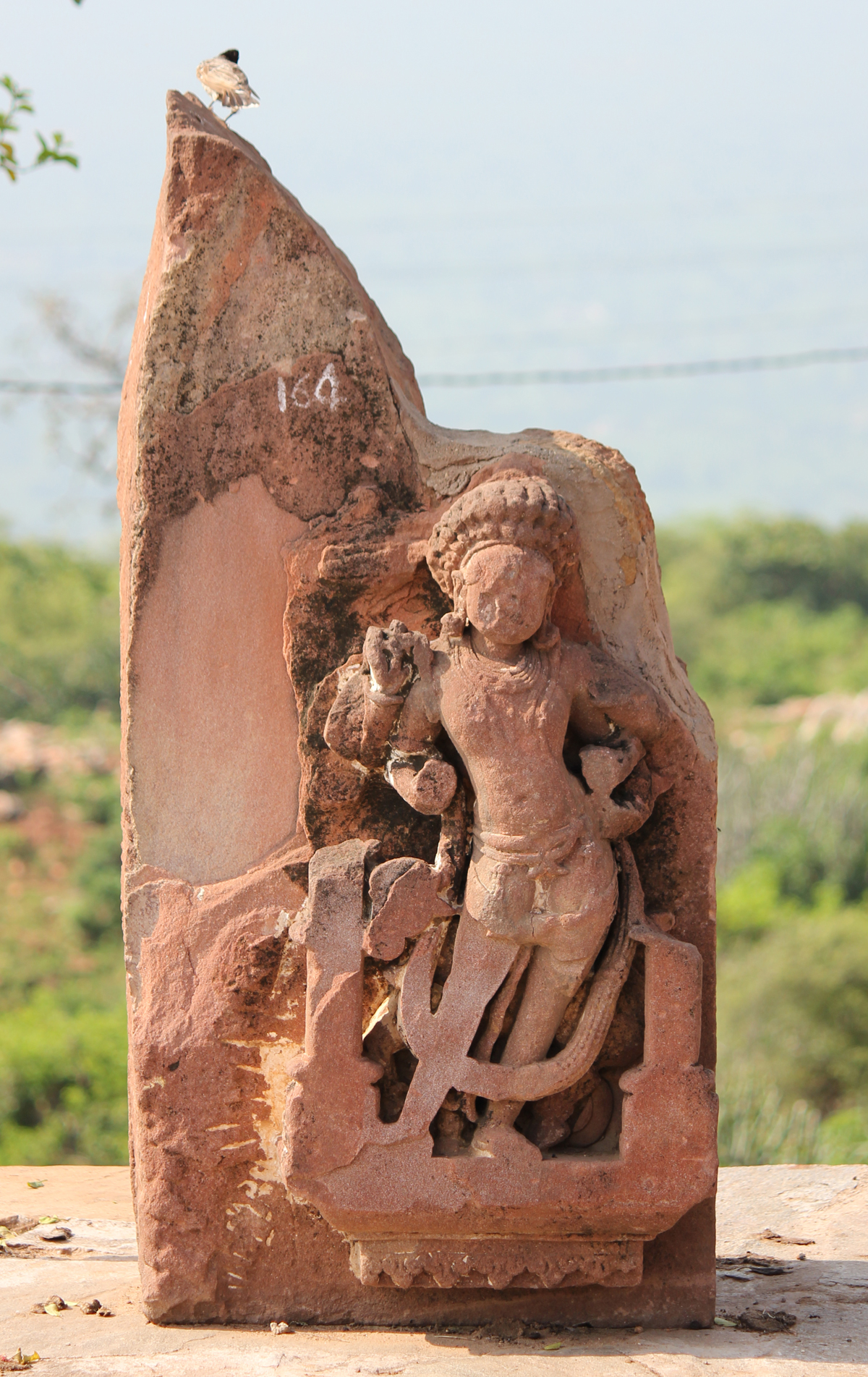
Sculptures

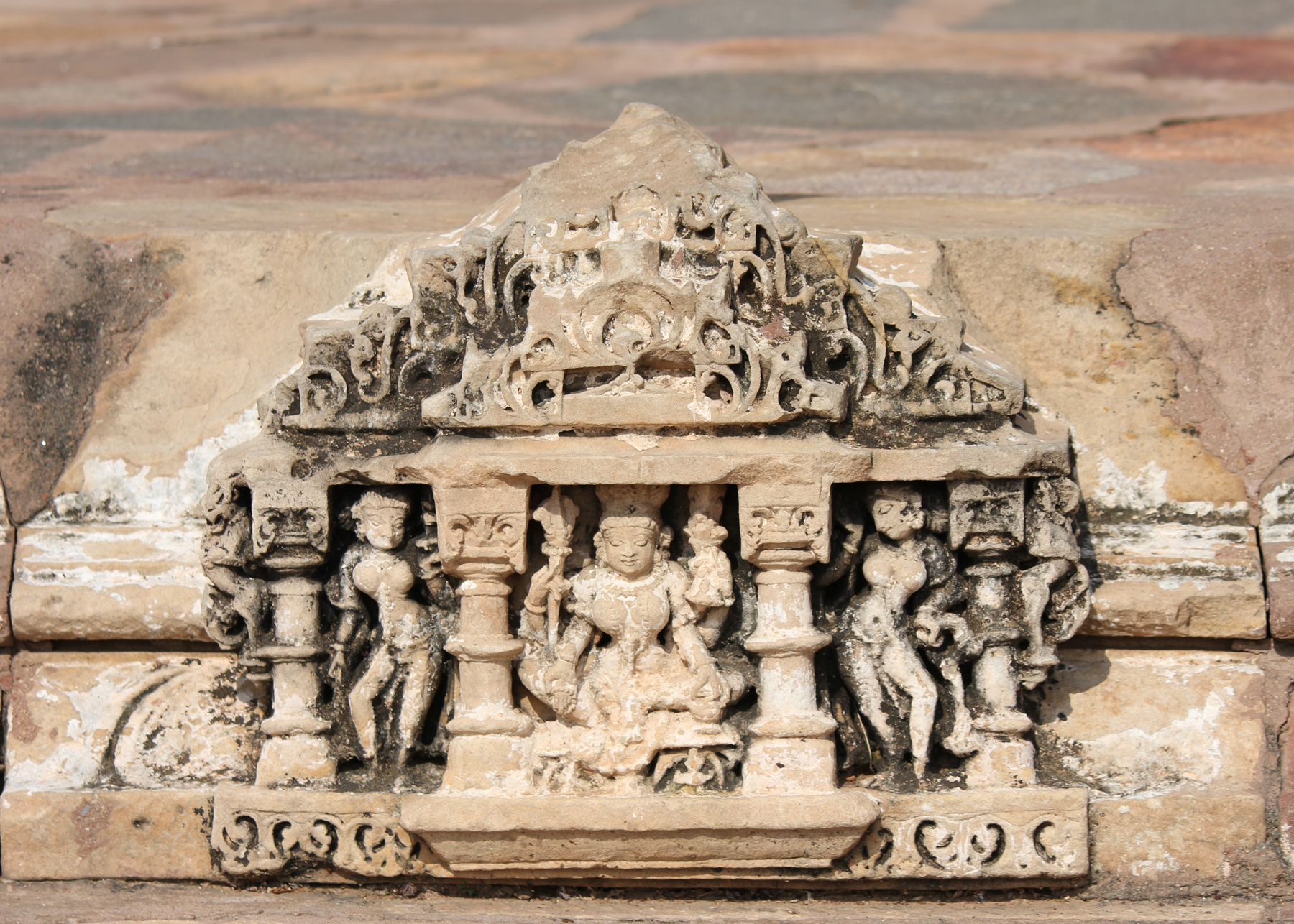
Sculptures

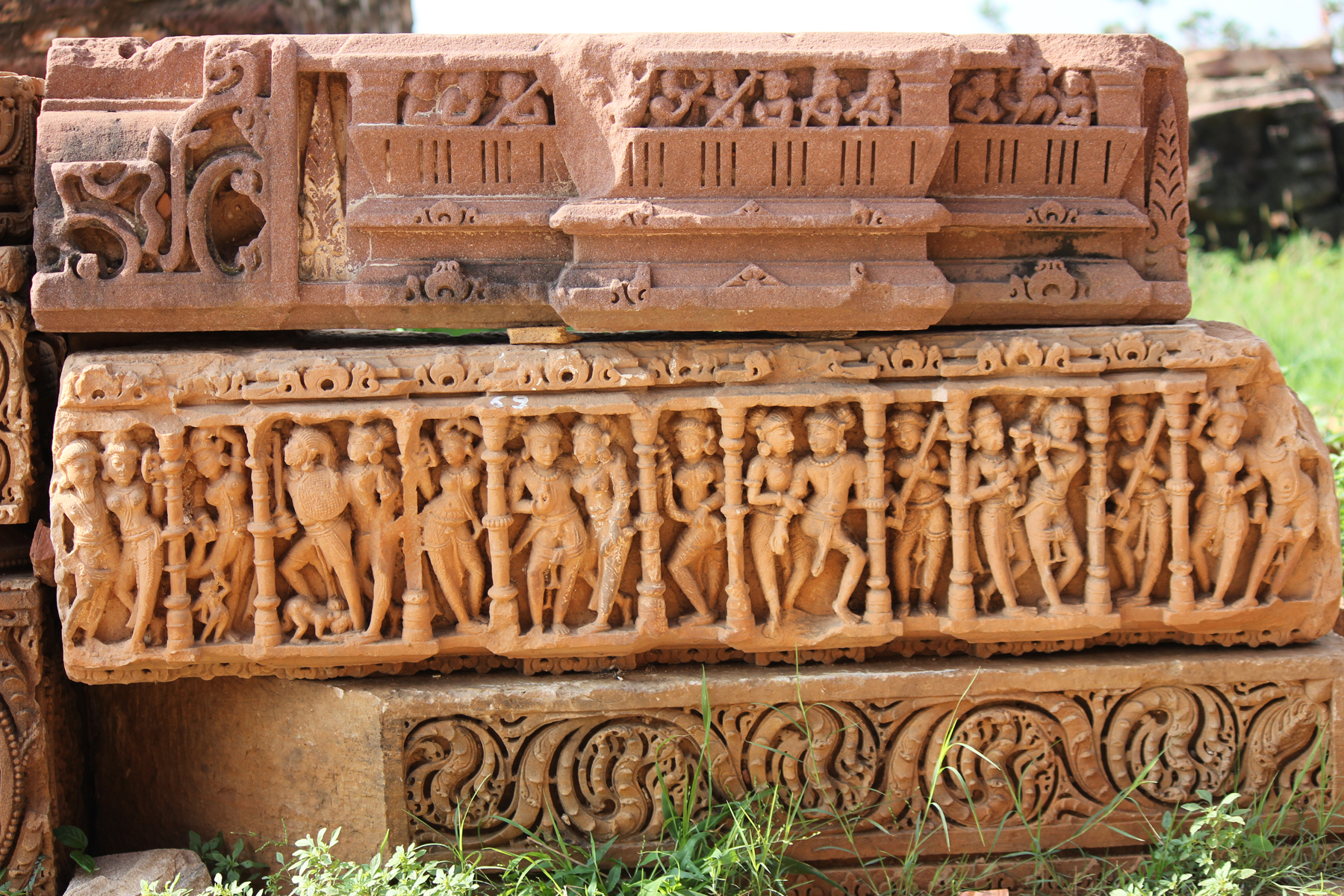
Sculptures

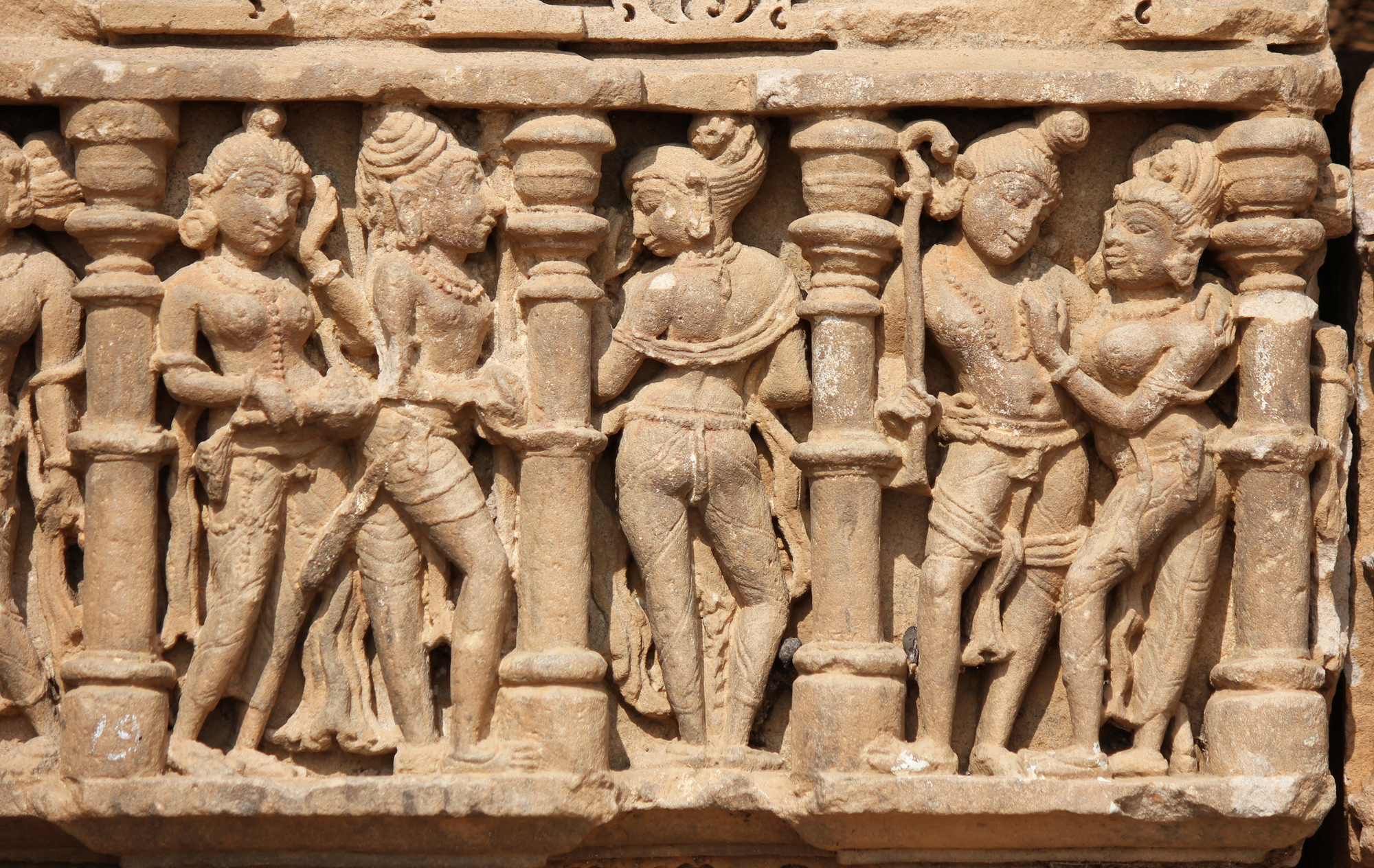
Sculptures

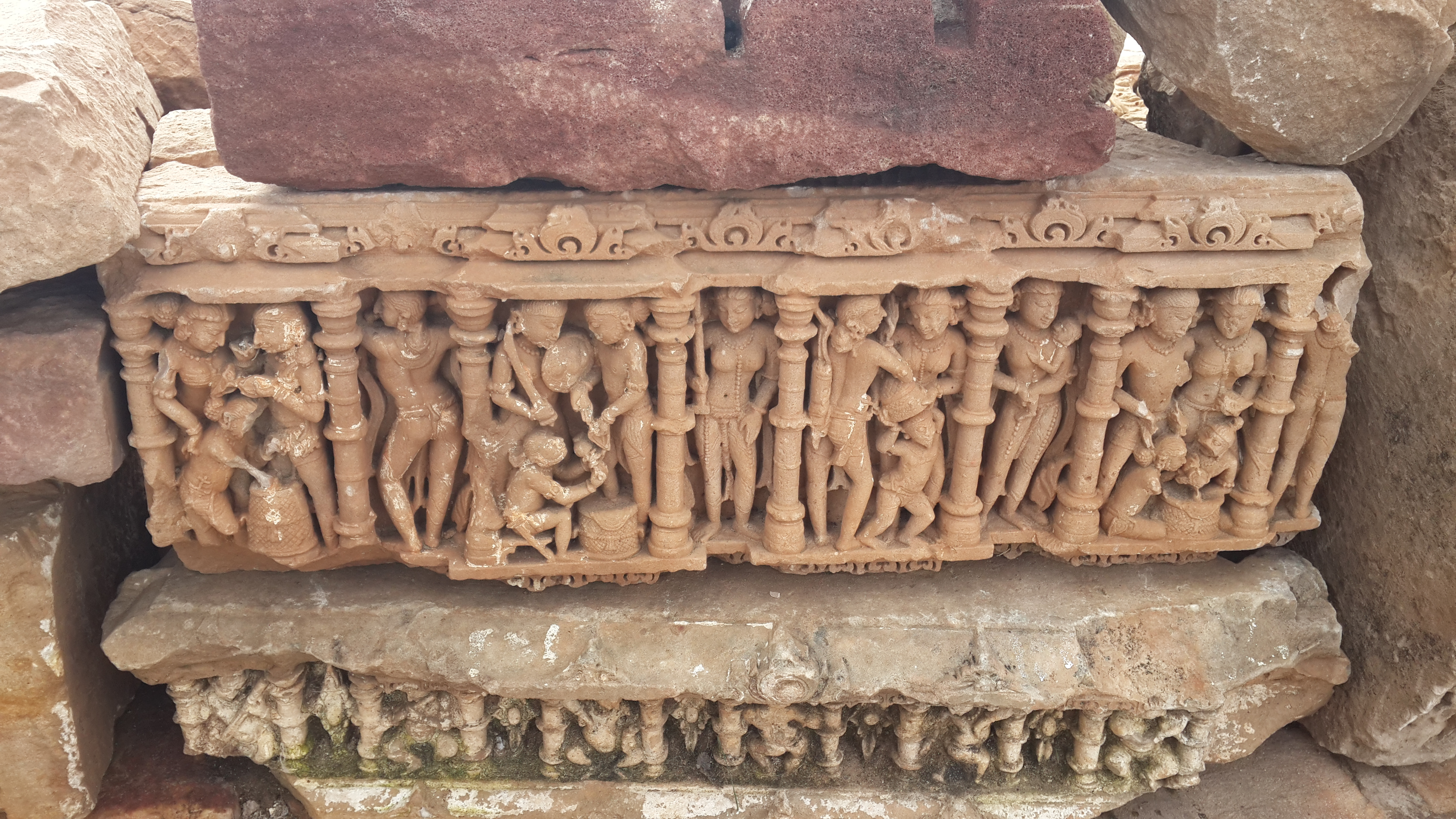
Sculptures

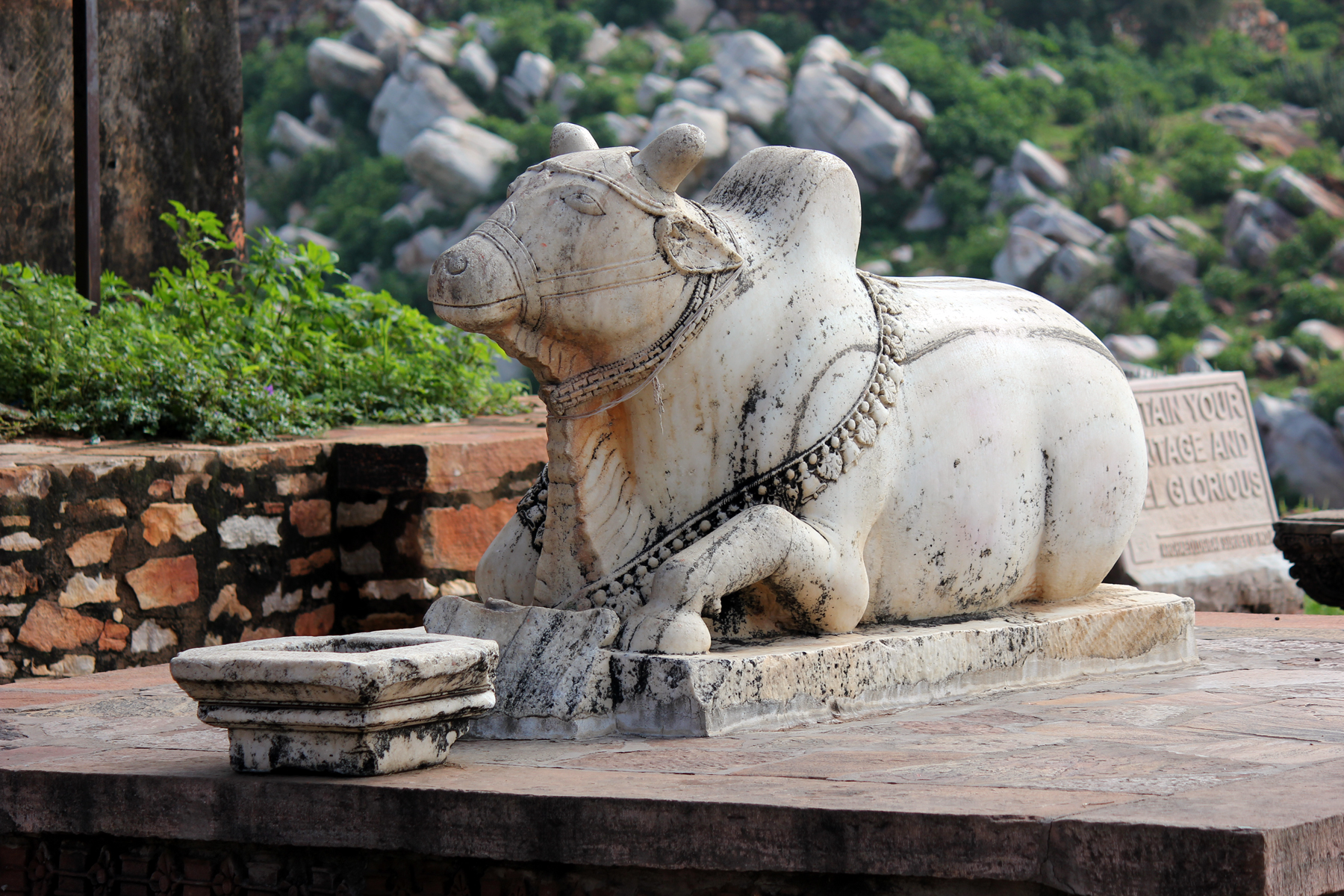
Nandi sculpture

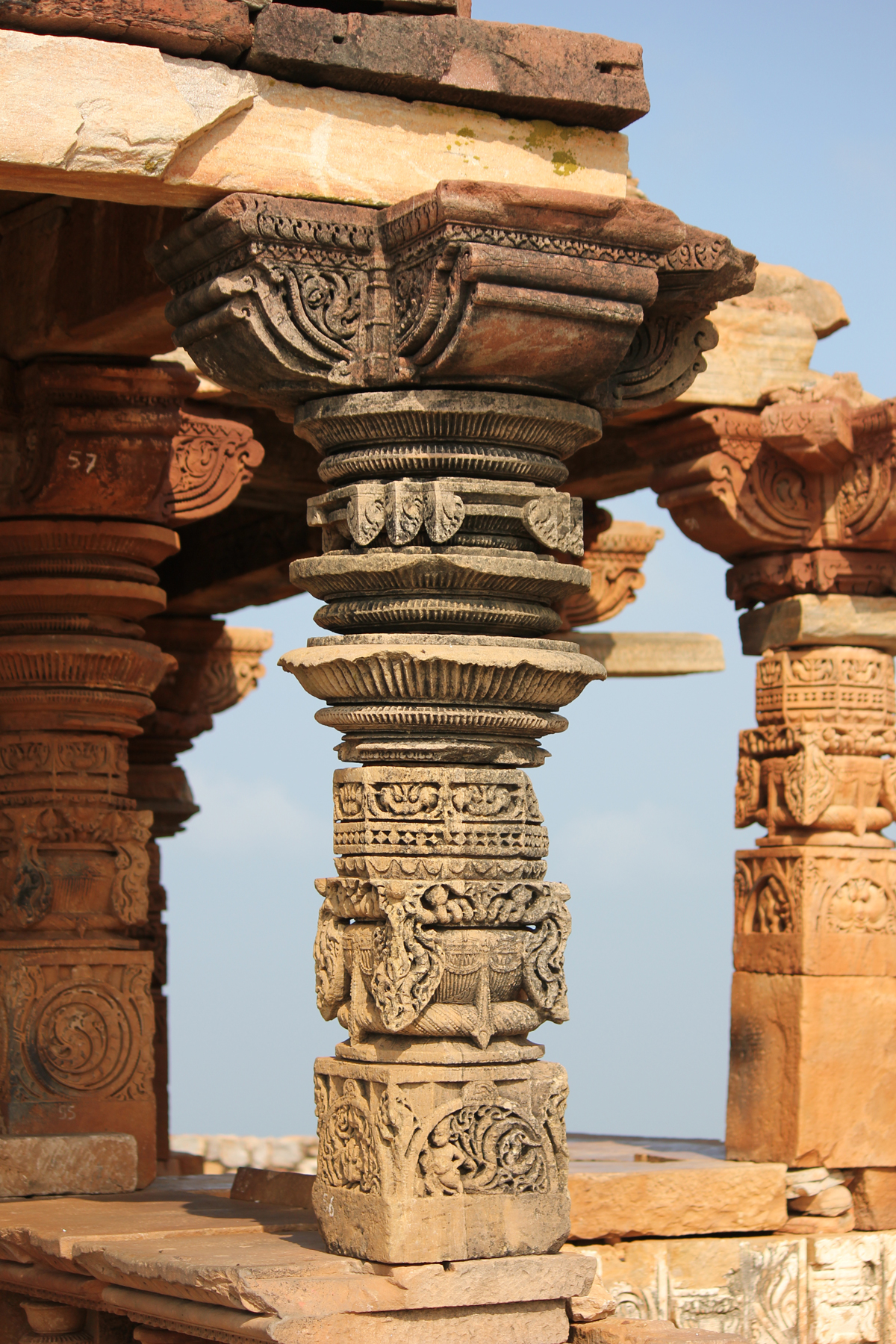
Pillar

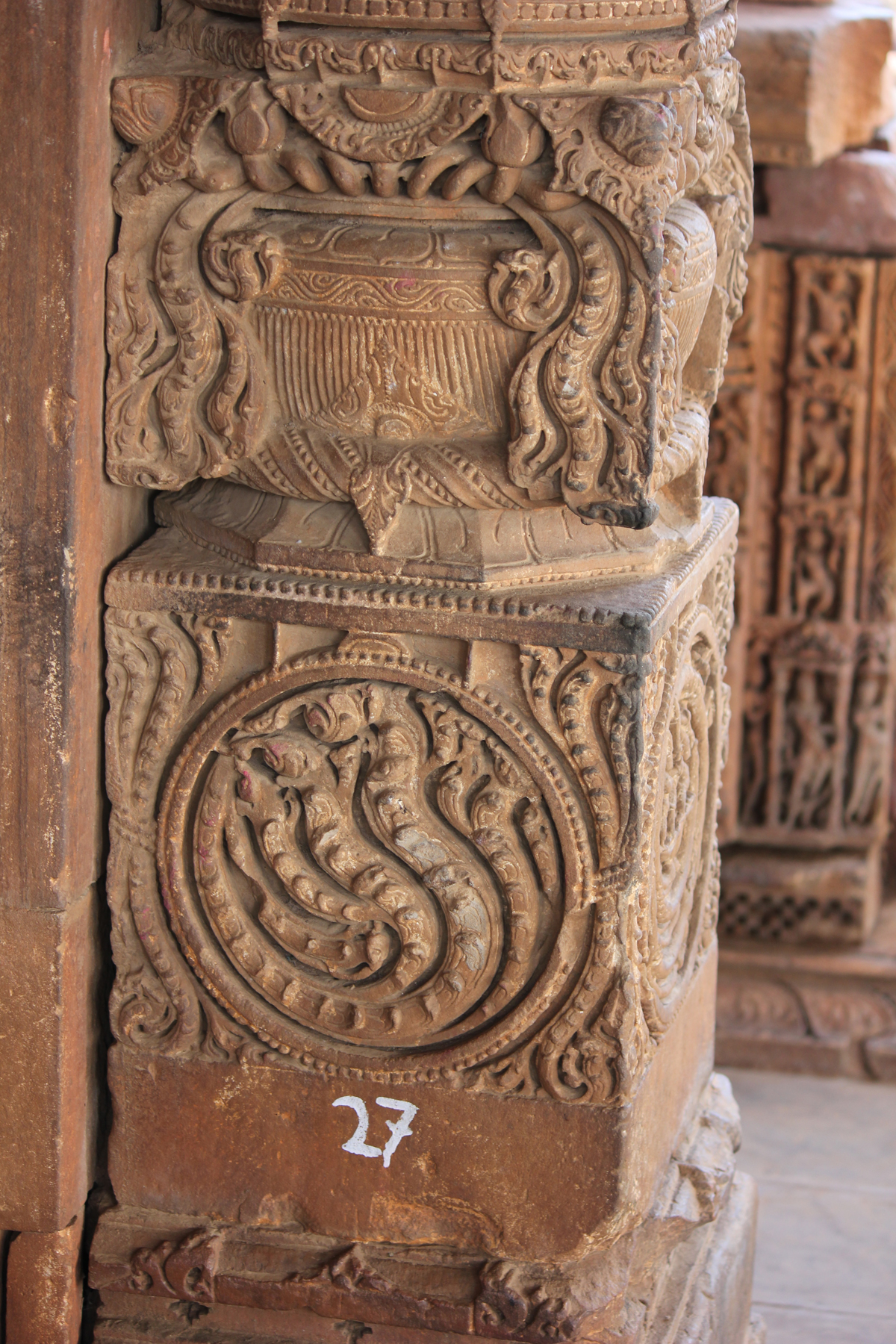
Pillar

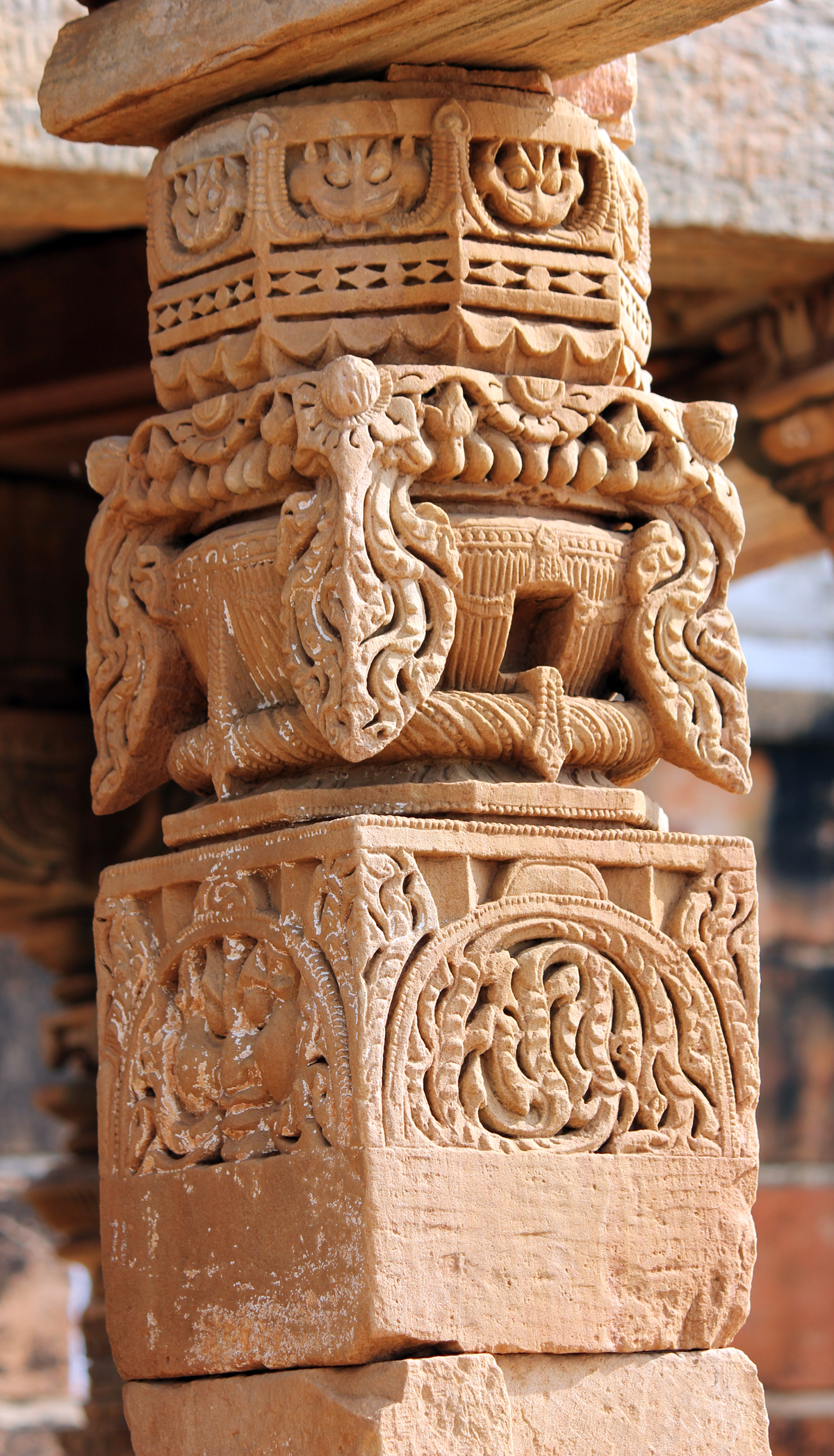
Pillar

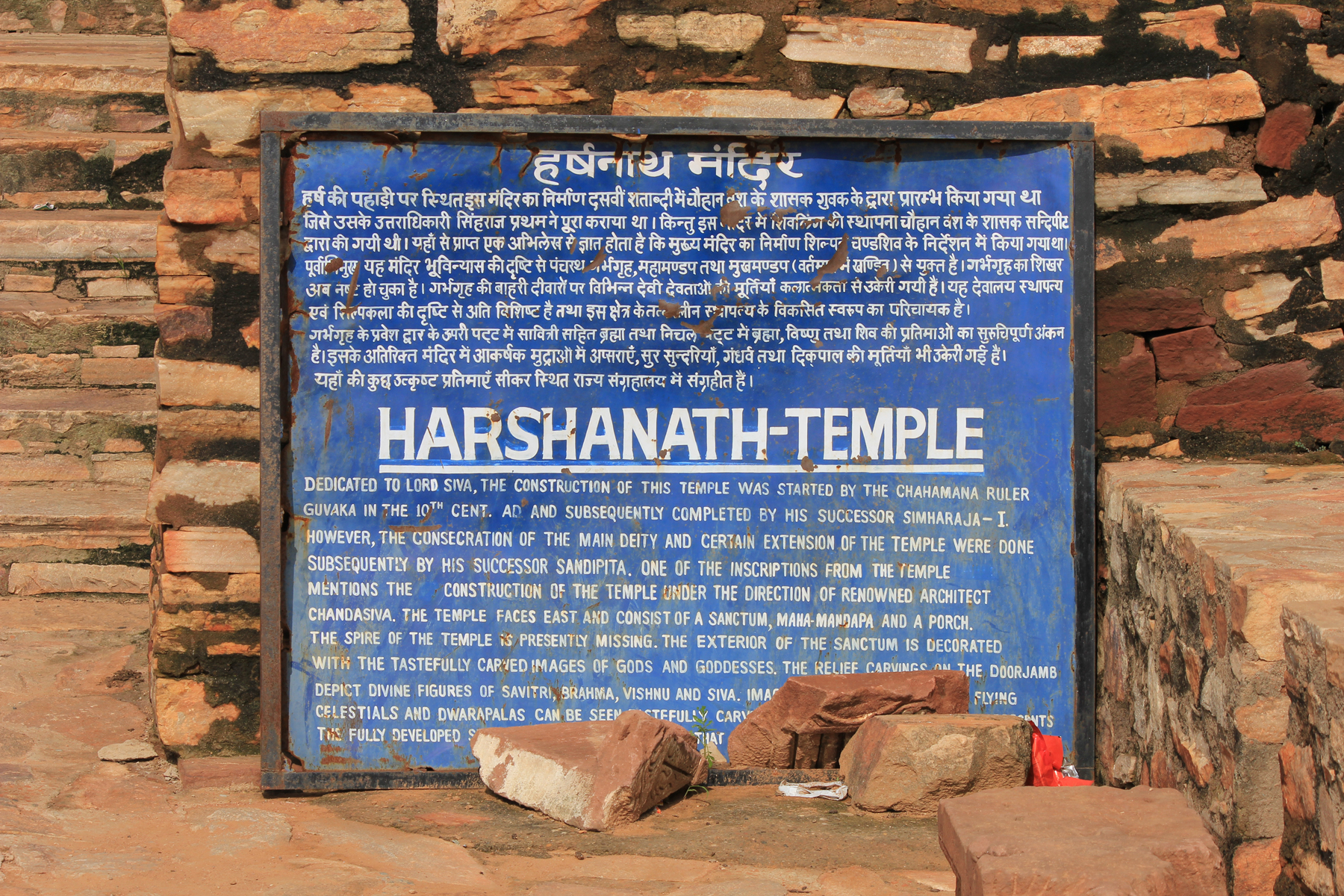
Information board

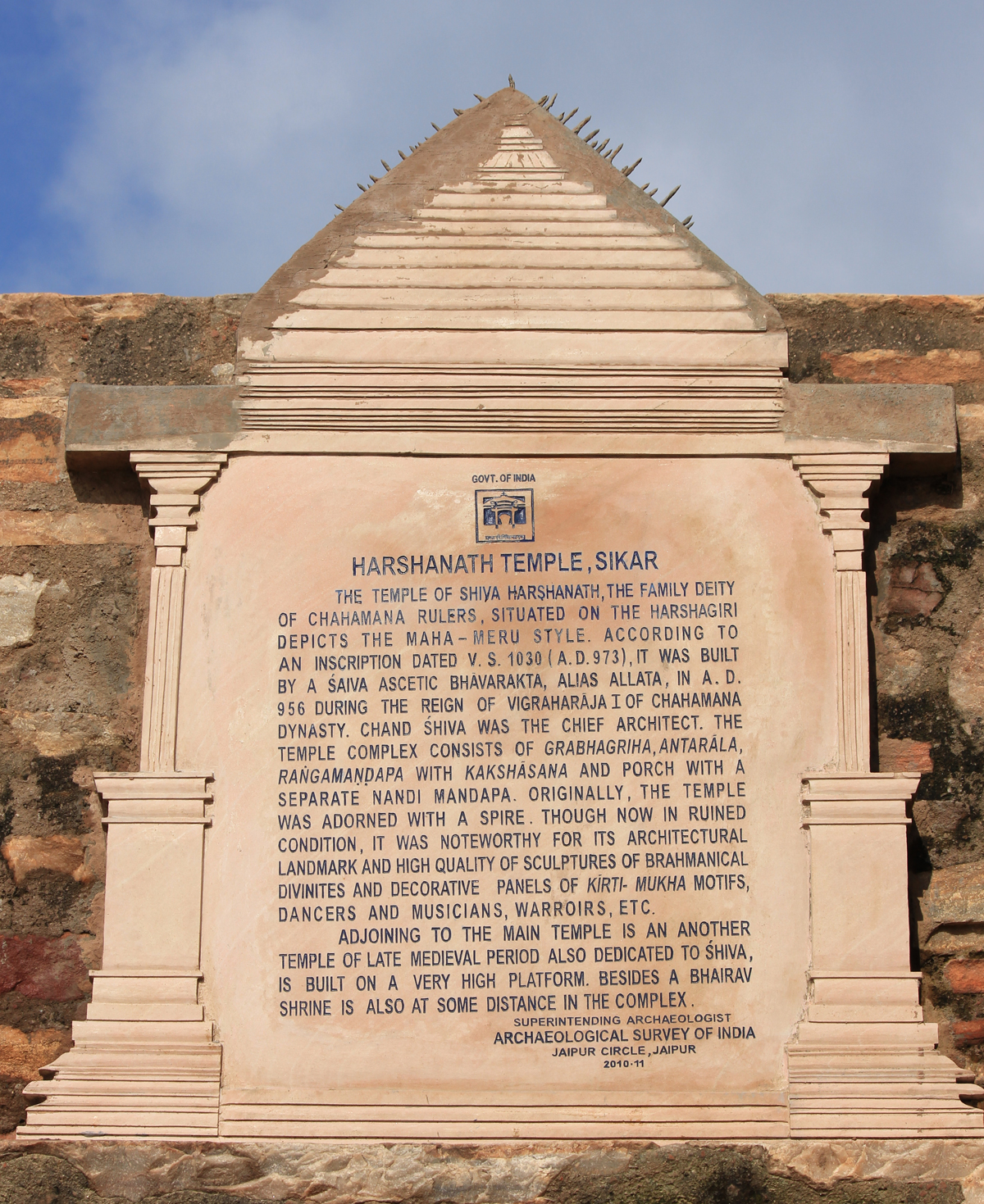
Information board

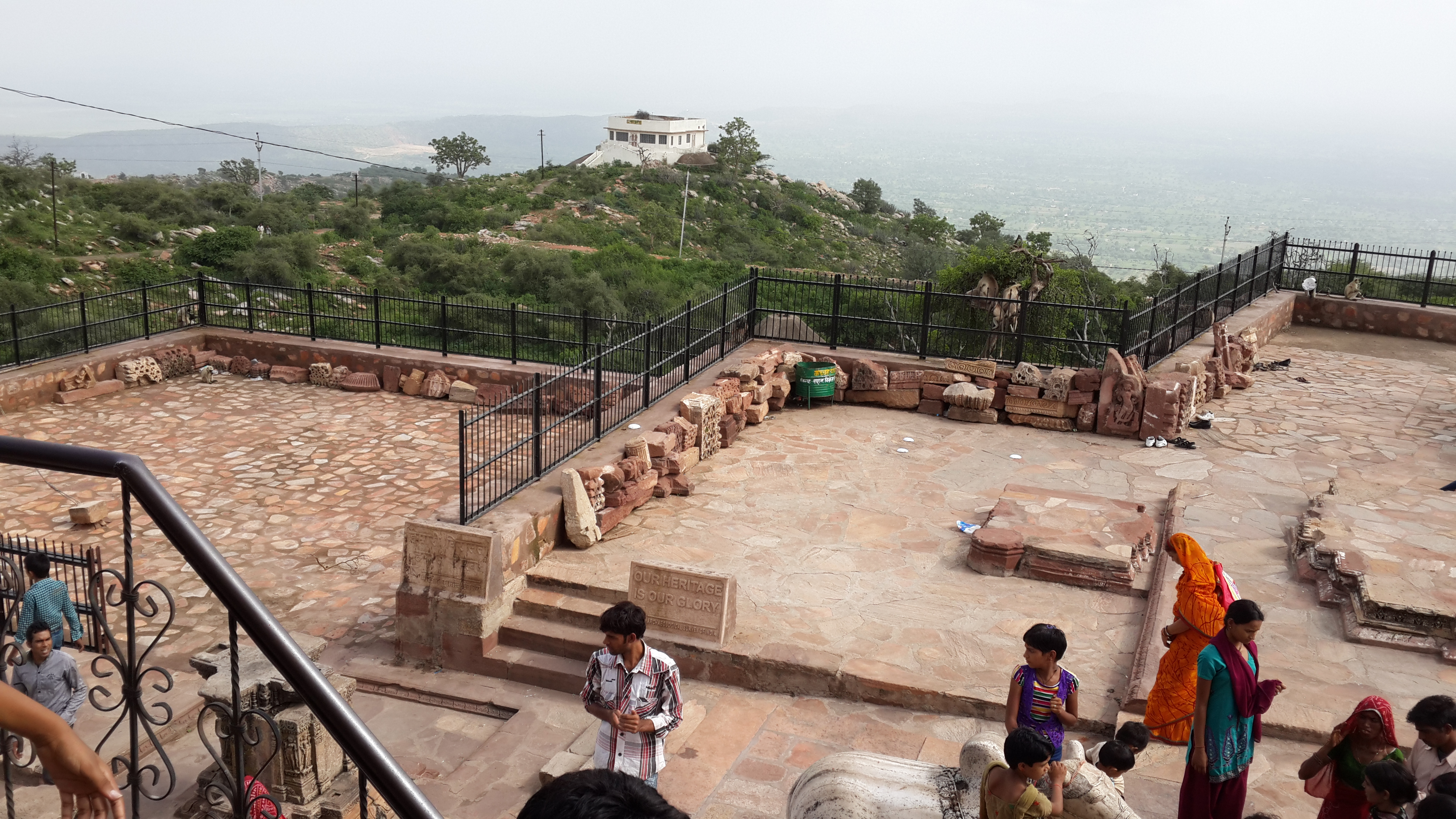
View from top

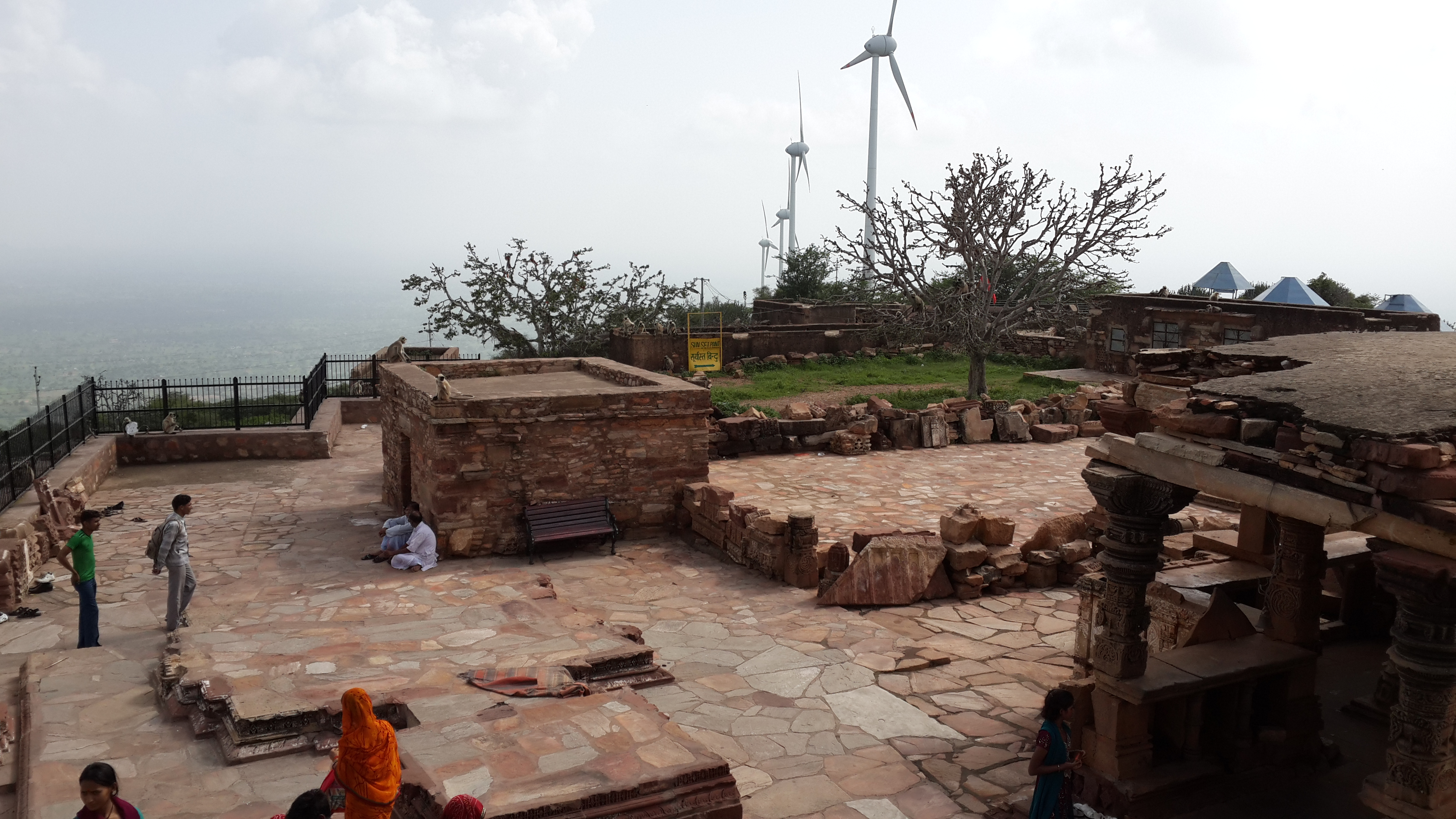
View from top
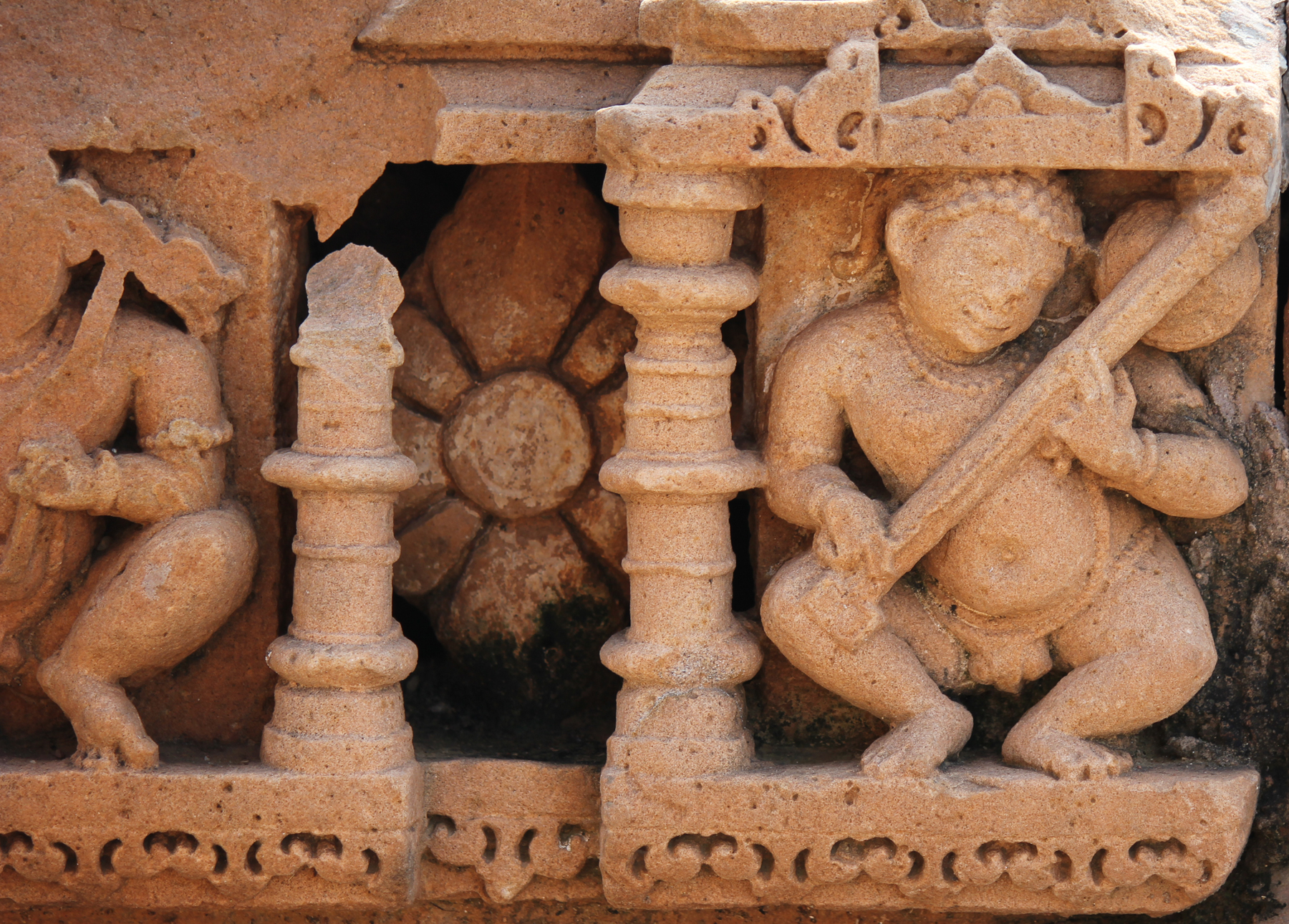
Sculpture of a musician playing an eka-tantri vina.

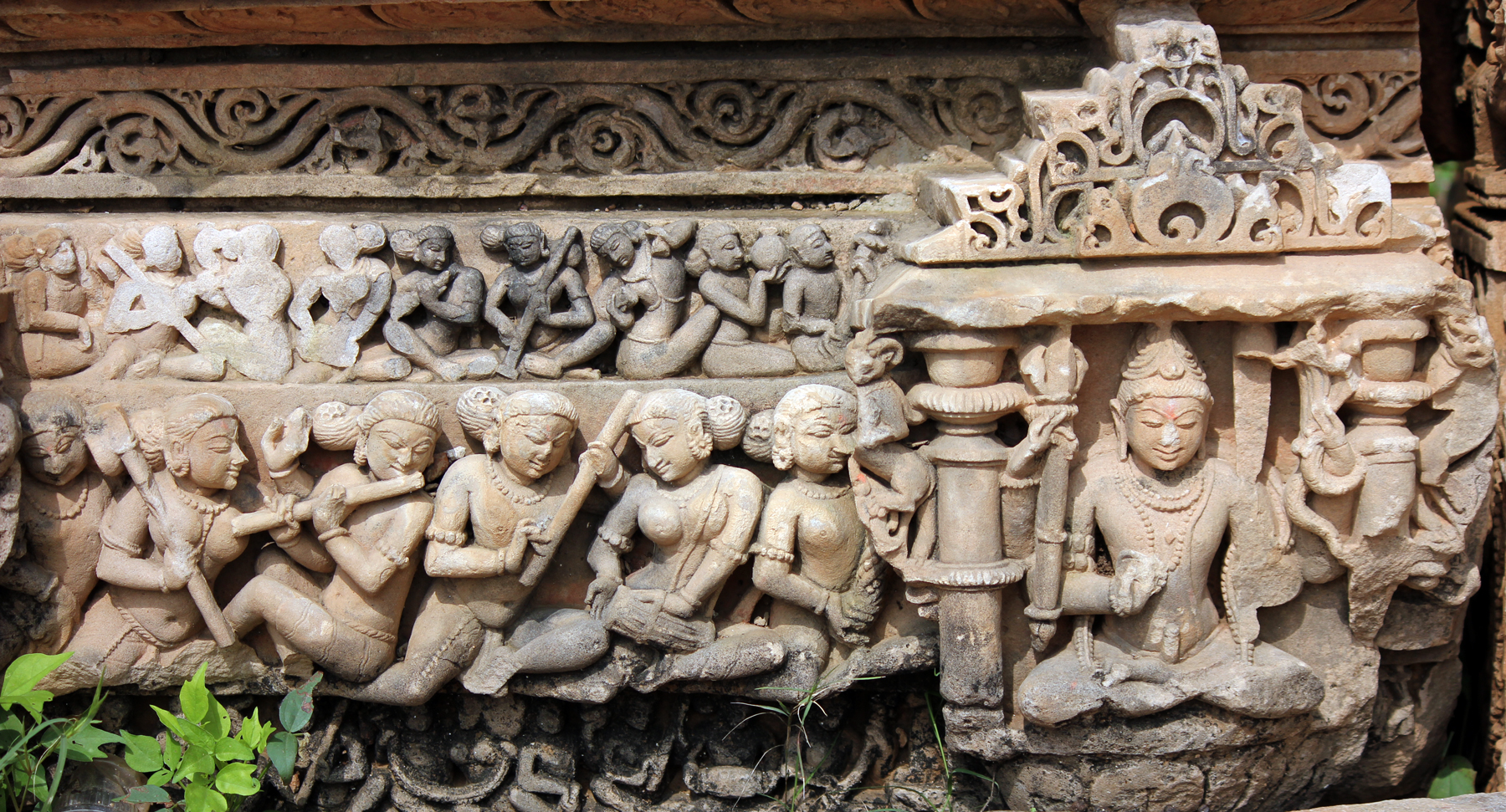
Sculpture of musicians playing eka-tantri vina, flute and drum

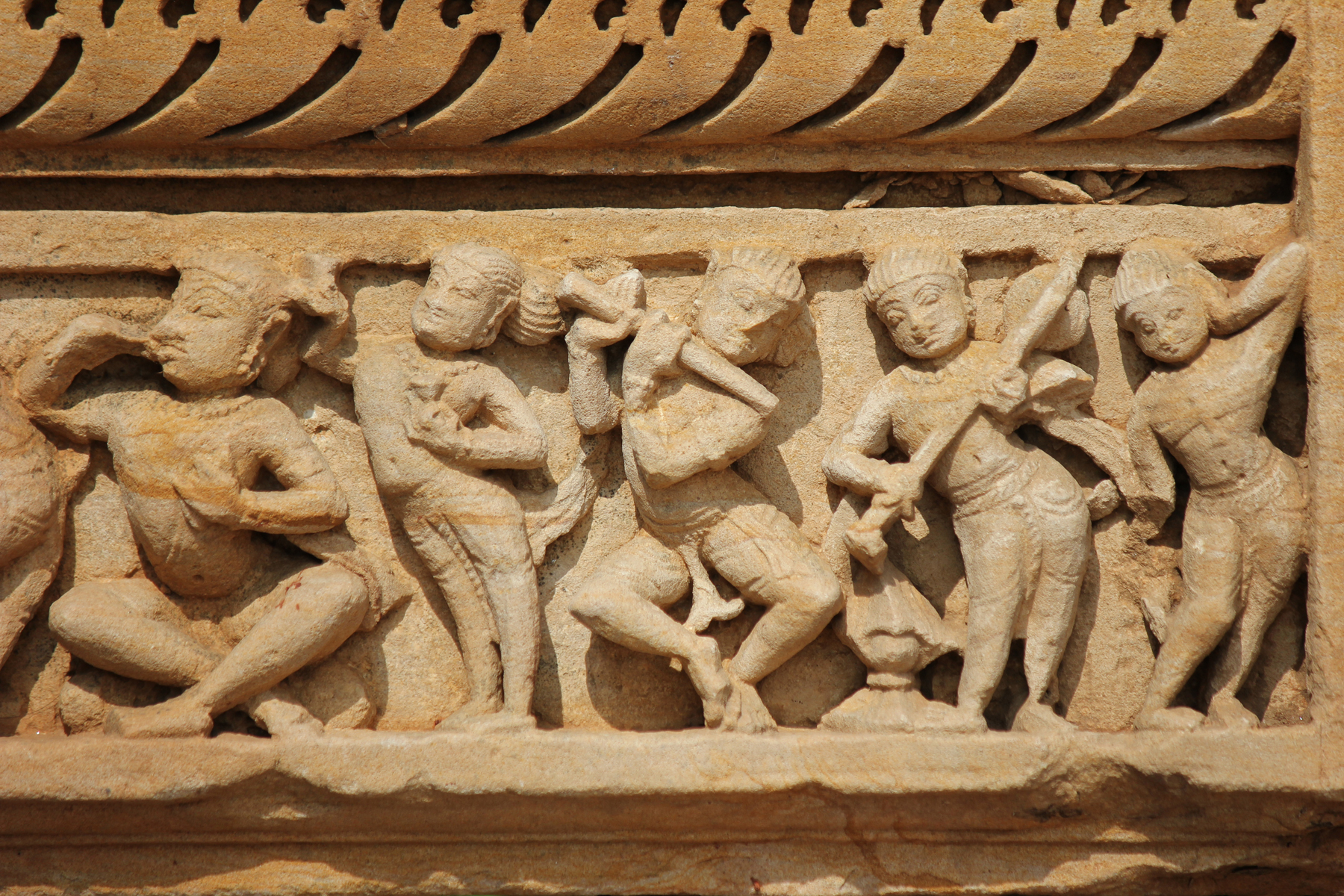
Musicians, an attendant ace a seated figure, possibly a nobleman

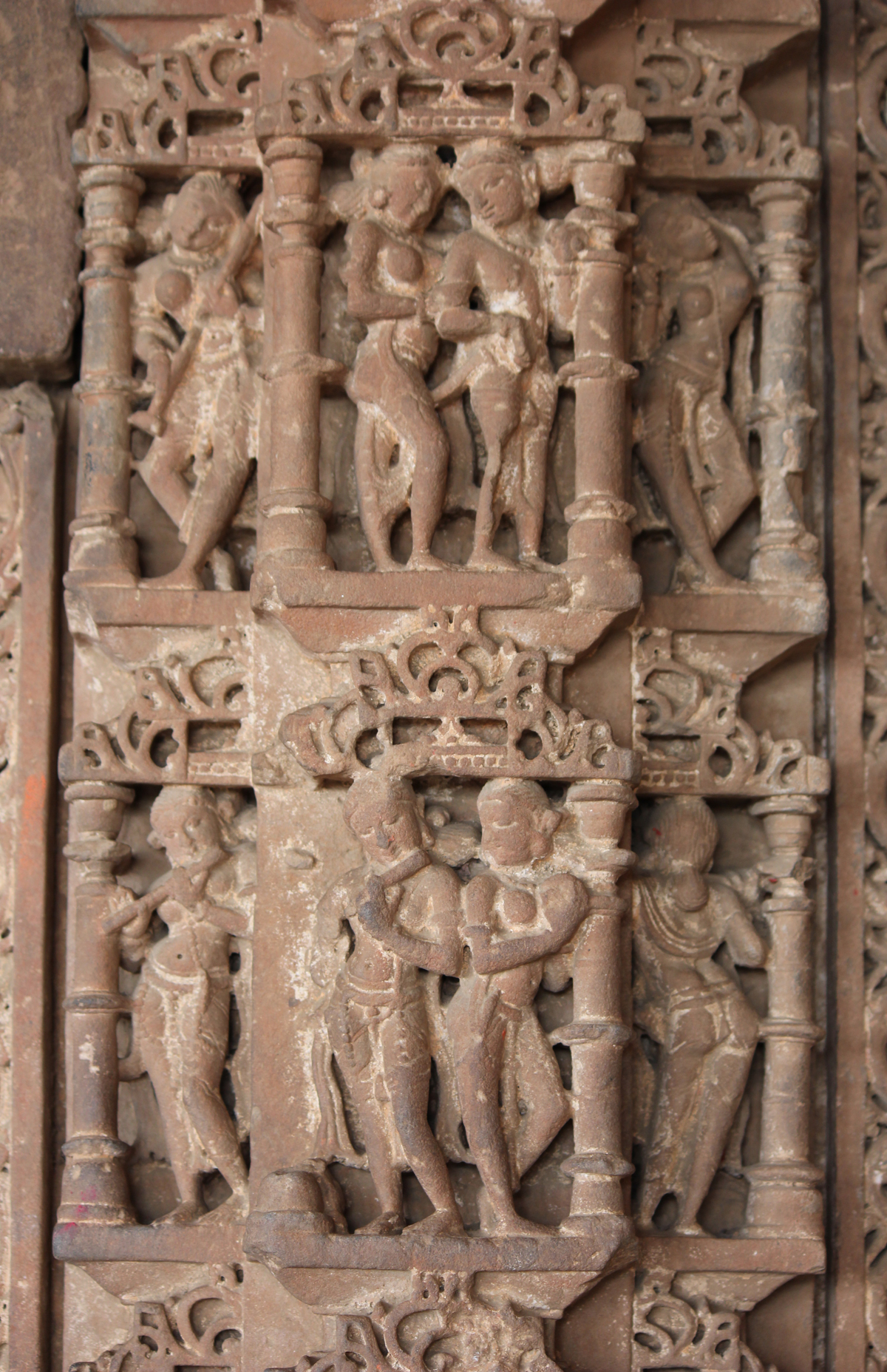
Sculpture showing musicians and a couple

== See also ==
- Harshat Mata Temple constructed during the Chahamana period
