= Banteay Srei =

Cambodian temple dedicated to Shiva

- ប្រាសាទបន្ទាយស្រី
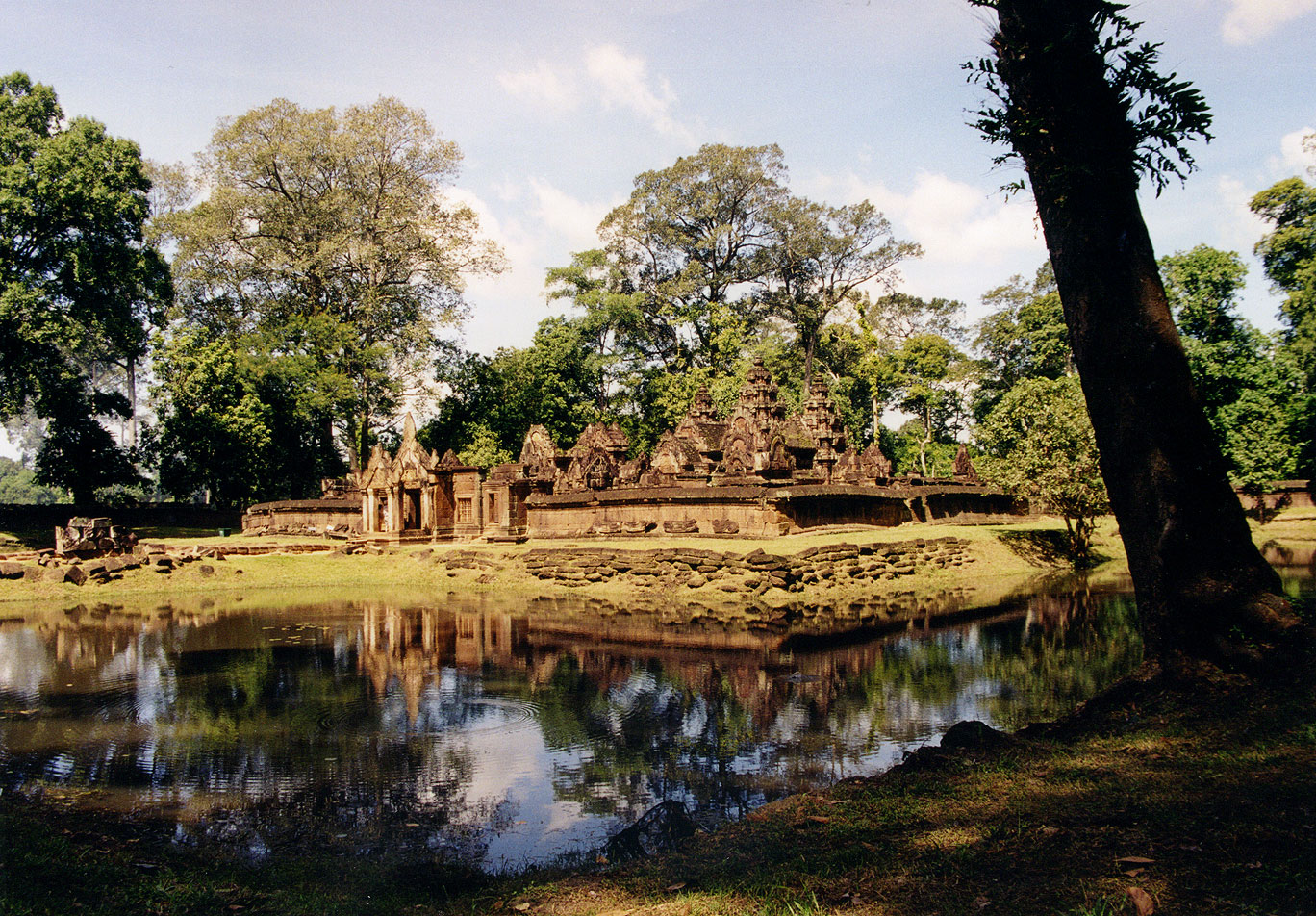

- Location within Cambodia

Religion
- Affiliation: Hinduism
- District: Banteay Srei
- Deity: Shiva and Parvati with many other Hindu deities

Location
- Location: Angkor
- State: Siem Reap
- Country: Cambodia
- Coordinates: 13°35′56″N 103°57′46″E

Architecture
- Type: Khmer
- Creator: Yajnavaraha
- Completed: 967

Banteay Srei (Khmer: បន្ទាយស្រី [ɓɑntiəj srəj]) is a 10th century CE Cambodian temple dedicated to the Hindu gods Shiva and Parvati. Located in the area of Angkor, it lies near the hill of Phnom Dei, 25 km (16 mi) north-east of the main group of temples that once belonged to the medieval capitals of Yaśodharapura and Angkor Thom. Banteay Srei is built largely of red sandstone, a medium that lends itself to the elaborate decorative wall carvings which are still observable today. The buildings themselves are miniature in scale, unusually so when measured by the standards of Angkorian construction. These factors have made the temple extremely popular with tourists, and have led to its being widely praised as the jewel of Khmer art.

== History ==
=== Foundation and dedication ===
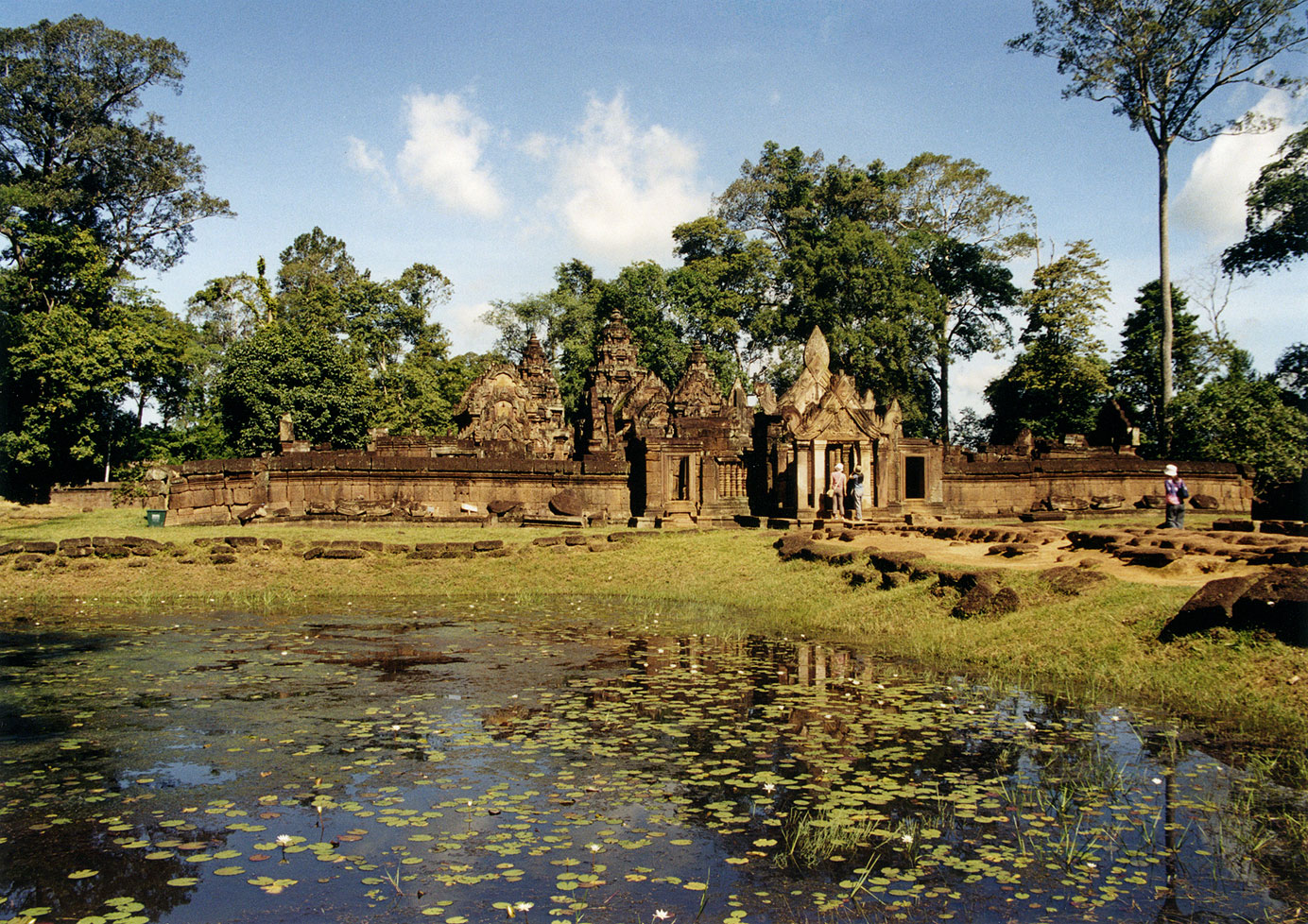
"Banteay Srei" ("Citadel of Women") is the modern name of a 10th-century CE Khmer temple originally called "Tribhuvanamaheshvara" ("Great Lord of the Threefold World"), an appellation of the god Shiva.

Consecrated on 22 April 967 CE, Banteay Srei was the only major temple at Angkor not built by rulers; its construction is credited to the courtiers named Vishnukumara and Yajnavaraha (modern Khmer: យជ្ញវរាហៈ), who served as counsellors to King Rajendravarman II (modern Khmer: ព្រះបាទរាជេន្រ្ទវរ្ម័ន). The foundational stela says that Yajnavaraha, grandson of King Harshavarman I, was a scholar and philanthropist who helped those who suffered from illness, injustice, or poverty. His pupil was the future King Jayavarman V (r. 968 – ca. 1001). Originally, the temple was surrounded by a town called Ishvarapura.

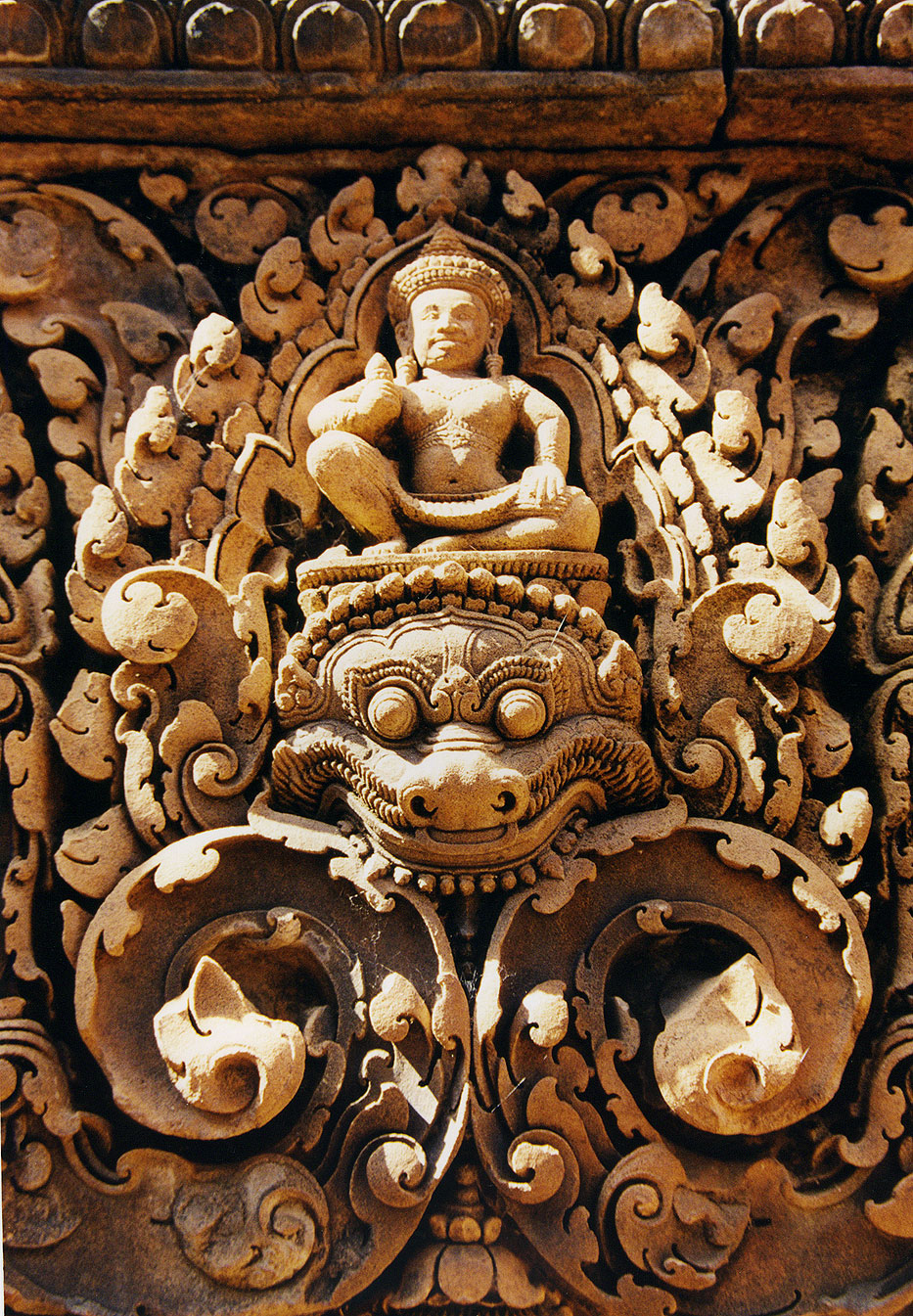
Banteay Srei is known for the intricacy of its carvings. This carving is of a Kala, a mythical animal representative of time and of the god Shiva.

Yajnavaraha's temple was primarily dedicated to the Hindu god Shiva. Originally, it carried the name Tribhuvanamaheshvara—great lord of the threefold world—in reference to the Shiva statue that served as its central religious image. However, the temple buildings appear to be divided along the central east–west axis between those buildings located south of the axis, which are devoted to Shiva, and those north of the axis, which are devoted to Vishnu.

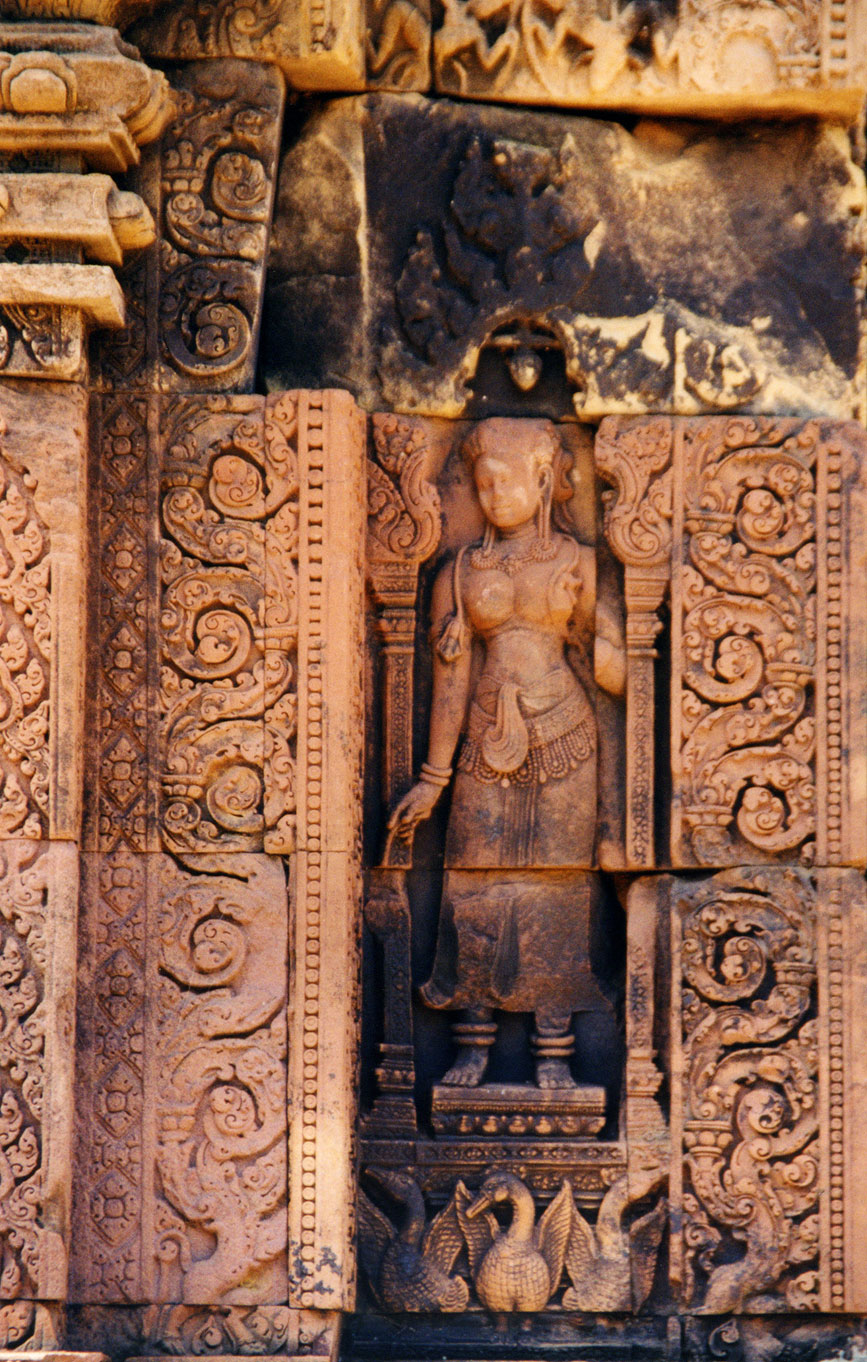
It has been speculated that the temple's modern name, Banteay Srei, is due to the many devatas carved into the red sandstone walls.

The temple's modern name, Banteay Srei—citadel of the women, or citadel of beauty—is probably related to the intricacy of the bas relief carvings found on the walls and the tiny dimensions of the buildings themselves. Some have speculated that it relates to the many devatas carved into the walls of the buildings.

=== Expansion and rededication ===
Banteay Srei was subject to further expansion and rebuilding work in the eleventh century CE. At some point it came under the control of the king and had its original dedication changed; the inscription K 194 from Phnom Sandak, dated Monday, 14 July 1119 CE records (line B 13) the temple being given to the priest Divakarapandita and being rededicated to Shiva. It remained in use at least until the fourteenth century, according to the last known inscription K 569, dated Thursday, 8 August 1303 CE.

=== Restoration ===
The temple was rediscovered in 1914 and was the subject of a celebrated case of art theft when André Malraux stole four devatas in 1923 (he was soon arrested, and the figures were returned). The incident stimulated interest in the site, which was cleared the following year.

In the 1930s Banteay Srei was restored through the first important use of anastylosis at Angkor whereby a ruined building or monument is restored using the original architectural elements to the greatest degree possible. Until the discovery of the foundation stela in 1936, it had been assumed that the extreme decoration indicated a later date than was the case.

To prevent the site from water damage, the joint Cambodian-Swiss Banteay Srei Conservation Project installed a drainage system between 2000 and 2003. Measures were also taken to prevent damage to the temples walls from nearby trees.

Unfortunately, the temple has been ravaged by pilfering and vandalism. When, toward the end of the 20th century, authorities removed some original statues and replaced them with concrete replicas, looters took to attacking the replicas. A statue of Shiva and Parvati, removed to the National Museum of Cambodia in Phnom Penh for safekeeping, was attempted to be stolen in the museum. The attackers were caught later and the statues were safely brought back to their location.

== Materials and style ==
Banteay Srei is built largely of a hard red sandstone that can be carved like wood. Brick and laterite were used only for the enclosure walls and some structural elements. The temple is known for the beauty of its sandstone lintels and pediments.

A pediment is the roughly triangular space above a rectangular doorway or openings. At Banteay Srei, pediments are relatively large in comparison to the openings below, and take a sweeping gabled shape. For the first time in the history of Khmer architecture, whole scenes of mythological subject-matter are depicted on the pediments.

A lintel is a horizontal beam spanning the gap between two posts. Some lintels serve a structural purpose, serving to support the weight of the superstructure, while others are purely decorative in purpose. The lintels at Banteay Srei are beautifully carved, rivalling those of the 9th century Preah Ko style in quality.

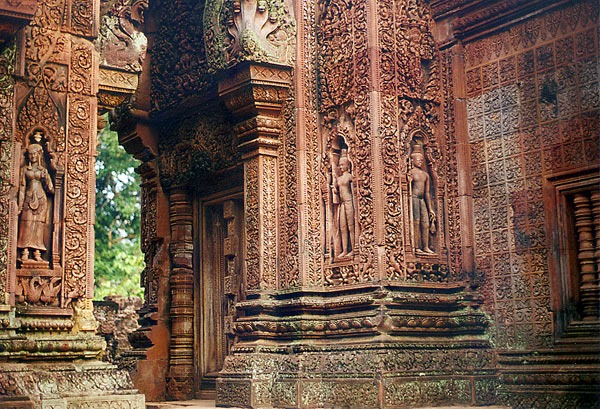
Many niches in the temple walls contain carvings of devatas or dvarapalas.

Noteworthy decorative motifs include Kala (a toothy mythical lion), the guardian dvarapalas (an armed protector of the temple) and devatas (gods and goddesses), the false door, and the colonette. Indeed, decorative carvings seem to cover almost every available surface. According to pioneering Angkor scholar Maurice Glaize, "Given the very particular charm of Banteay Srei – its remarkable state of preservation and the excellence of a near perfect ornamental technique – one should not hesitate, of all the monuments of the Angkor group, to give it the highest priority." At Banteay Srei, wrote Glaize, "the work relates more closely to the art of the goldsmith and to carving in wood than to sculpture in stone".

== The site ==
The site consists of three concentric rectangular enclosures constructed on an east–west axis. A causeway situated on the axis leads from an outer gopura, or gate, to the third or outermost of the three enclosures. The inner enclosure contains the sanctuary, consisting of an entrance chamber and three towers, as well as two buildings conventionally referred to as libraries.

=== The outer gopura ===
The gopura is all that remains of the outer wall surrounding the town of Ishvarapura. The wall is believed to have measured approximately 500 m square, and may have been constructed of wood. The gopura's eastern pediment shows Indra, who was associated with that direction, mounted on his three-headed elephant Airavata. The 67 m causeway with the remains of corridors on either side connects the gopura with the third enclosure. North and south of this causeway are galleries with a north–south orientation.

=== The third (outer) enclosure ===
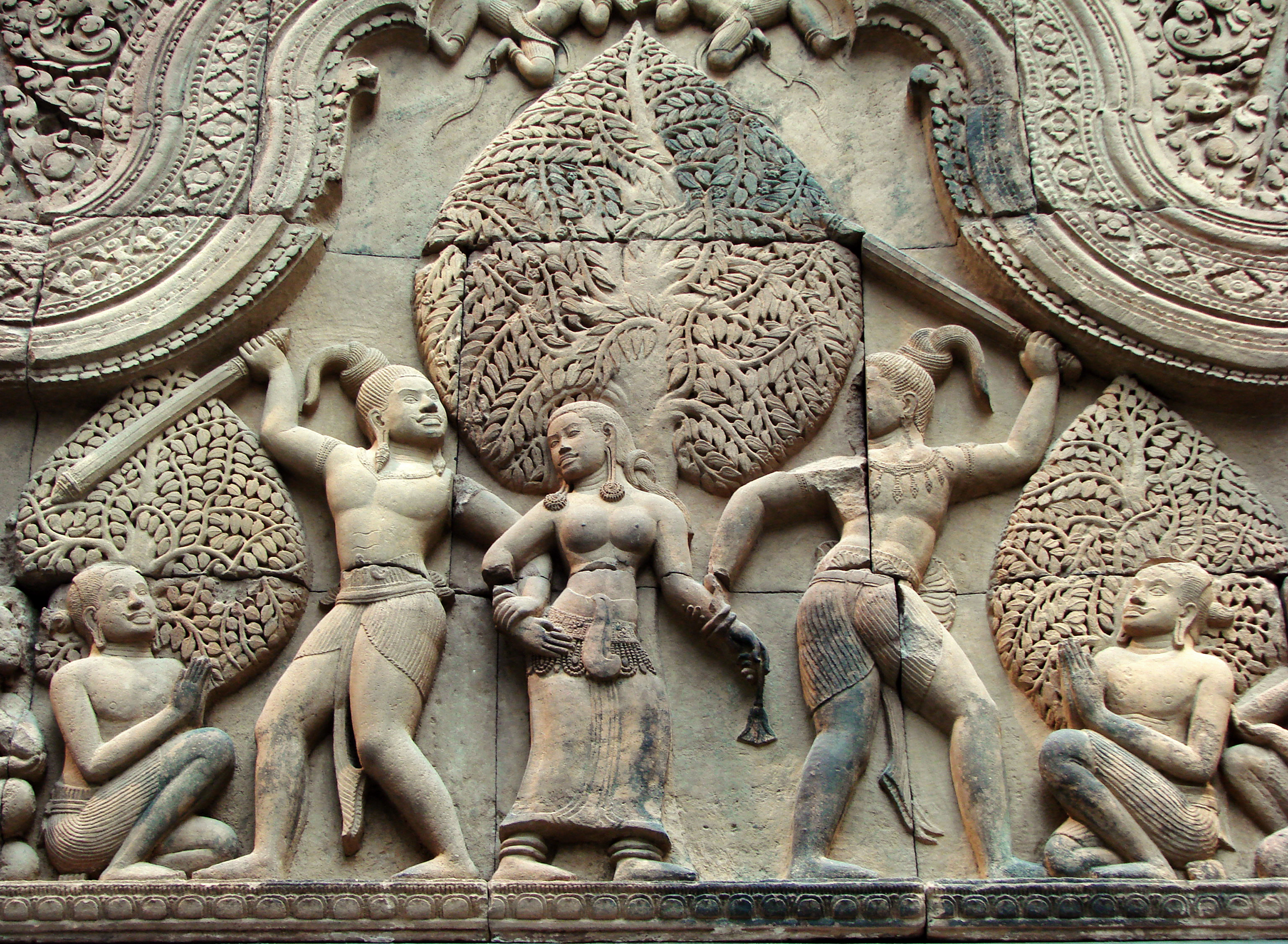
Pediment depicting the fight between Sunda and Upasunda Over the apsara Tilottama located in the Guimet Museum.

The third enclosure is 95 by 110 m; it is surrounded by a laterite wall breached by gopuras at the eastern and western ends. Neither pediment of the eastern gopura is in situ. The west-facing pediment is now located in the Guimet Museum in Paris. It depicts a scene from the Mahabharata in which the asura brothers Sunda and Upasunda fight over the apsara Tilottama and both Sunda and Upasunda kill each other and Tilottama escapes. The east-facing pediment is lying on the ground. It depicts a scene from the Ramayana in which the demon Maricha seizes Rama's wife Sita and Maricha is killed by Rama. Most of the area within the third enclosure is occupied by a moat divided into two parts by causeways to the east and west.

=== The second enclosure ===
The second enclosure

The combat between Vali and Sugriva and Rama kills Vali is depicted on the western gopura.

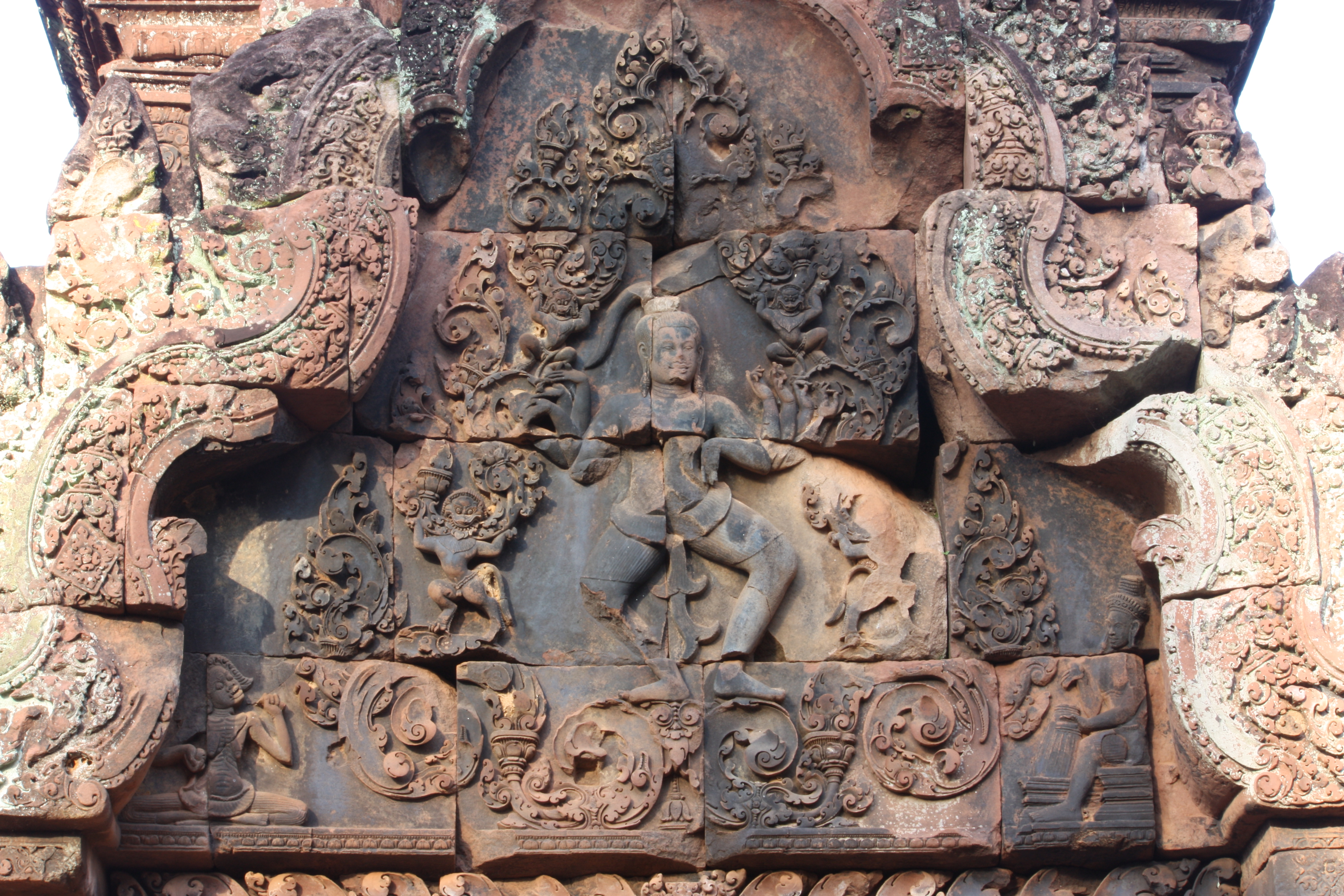
Shiva in the form of Nataraja is depicted on the eastern gopura of the inner enclosure wall.

The second enclosure sits between an outer laterite wall measuring 38 by 42 m, with gopuras at the eastern and western ends, and a brick inner enclosure wall, measuring 24 by 24 m. The western gopura features an interesting bas relief depicting the duel of the Vanara Kings Vali and Sugriva, as well as Rama's intervention on Sugriva's behalf when Rama kills Vali and makes Sugriva win the duel. The inner enclosure wall has collapsed, leaving a gopura at the eastern end and a brick shrine at the western. The eastern pediment of the gopura shows Shiva in the form of Nataraja; the west-facing pediment has an image of Karaikkal Ammaiyar, one of the three women saints amongst the sixty three Nayanars (hounds of Shiva). Likewise, the laterite galleries which once filled the second enclosure (one each to north and south, two each to east and west) have partially collapsed. A pediment on one of the galleries shows Vishnu as Narasimha, the fourth avatara of Vishnu in the Dashavatara disemboweling and killing the demon Hiranyakashipu to death.

=== The first (inner) enclosure ===
Between the gopuras on the collapsed inner wall are the buildings of the inner enclosure: a library in the south-east corner and another in the north-east corner, and in the centre the sanctuary set on a T-shaped platform 0.9 m high. Besides being the most extravagantly decorated parts of the temple, these have also been the most successfully restored (helped by the durability of their sandstone and their small scale). In 2010, the first enclosure is open to visitors again, but the inner temples are roped off and inaccessible.

==== The libraries ====
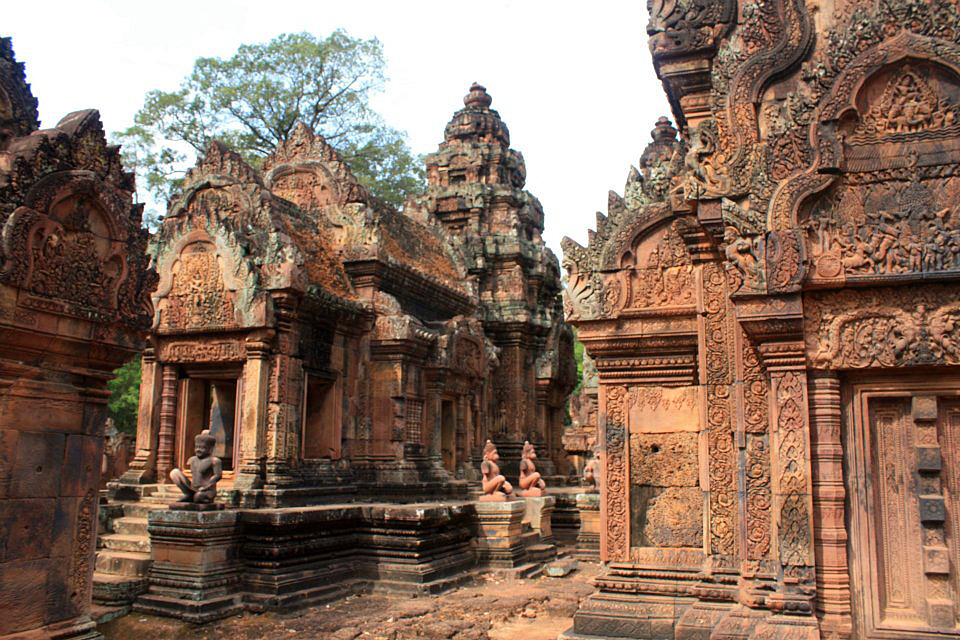
The intricate reliefs carving of red colored stone

The two libraries are of brick, laterite and sandstone. Each library has two pediments, one on the eastern side and one on the western. According to Maurice Glaize, the four library pediments, "representing the first appearance of tympanums with scenes, are works of the highest order. Superior in composition to any which followed, they show true craftsmanship in their modelling in a skilful blend of stylisation and realism."

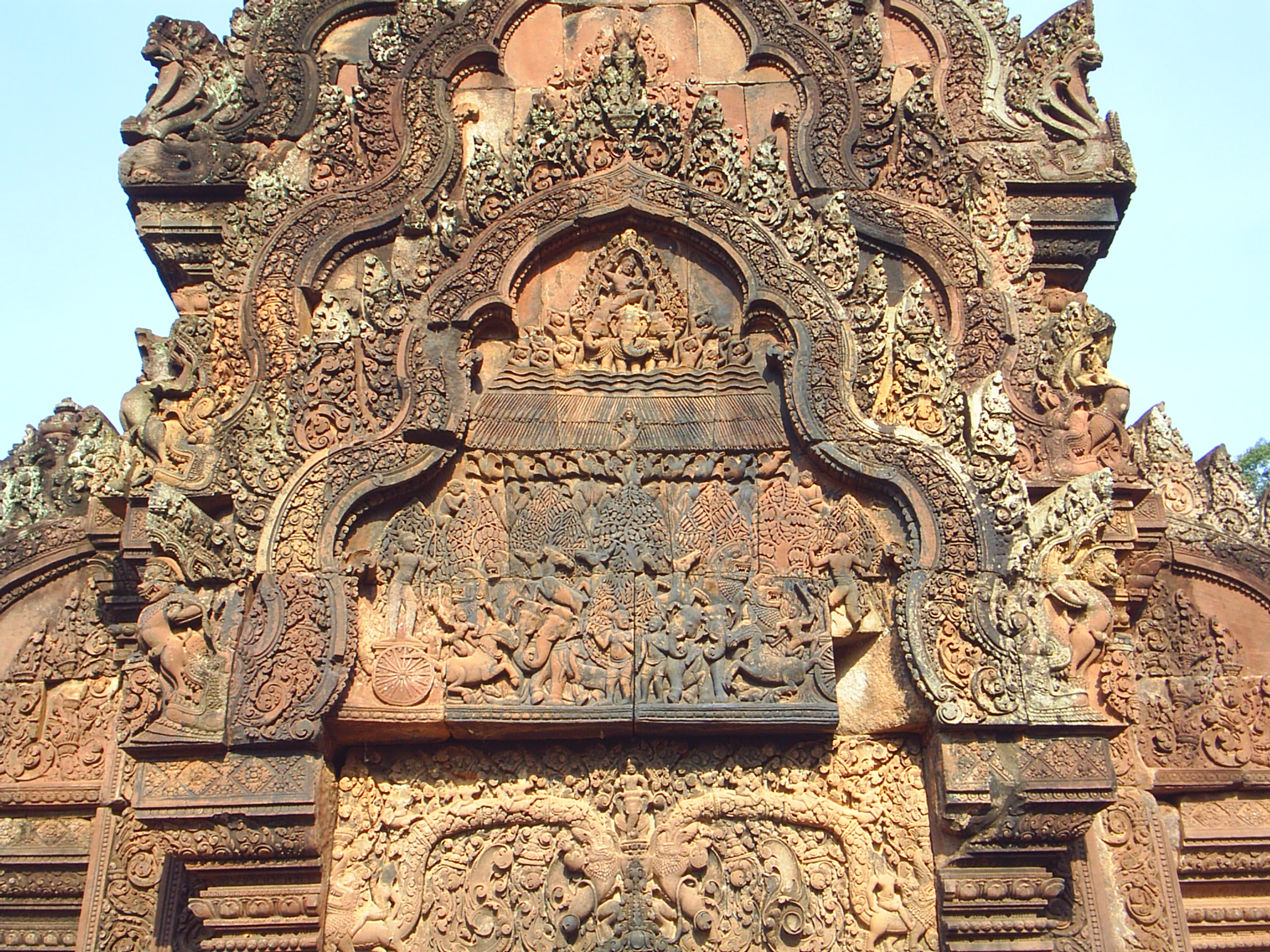
Another pediment shows the burning of Khandava Forest by Krishna and Arjuna with Agni against Indra in the Mahabharata.

The east-facing pediment on the southern library shows Shiva and Parvati seated on the summit of Mount Kailasha, their mythological abode. Their respective consorts Parvati and Shiva both sit near them and clings anxiously to their torsos. Other beings are also present on the slopes of the mountain, arranged in a strict hierarchy of three tiers from top to bottom. In the top tier sit bearded wise saints and ascetics, in the middle tier mythological figures with the heads of animals and the bodies of humans, and in the bottom tier large animals, including a number of lions. In the middle of the scene stands the ten-headed demon king Ravana. Ravana is shaking the mountain in its very foundations as the animals flee from his presence and as the wise saints and mythological beings discuss the situation and pray to Parvati and Shiva. According to the legend, Shiva and Parvati stopped Ravana from shaking the mountain by using their toes to press down on the mountain and to trap Ravana underneath before releasing him after sometime.

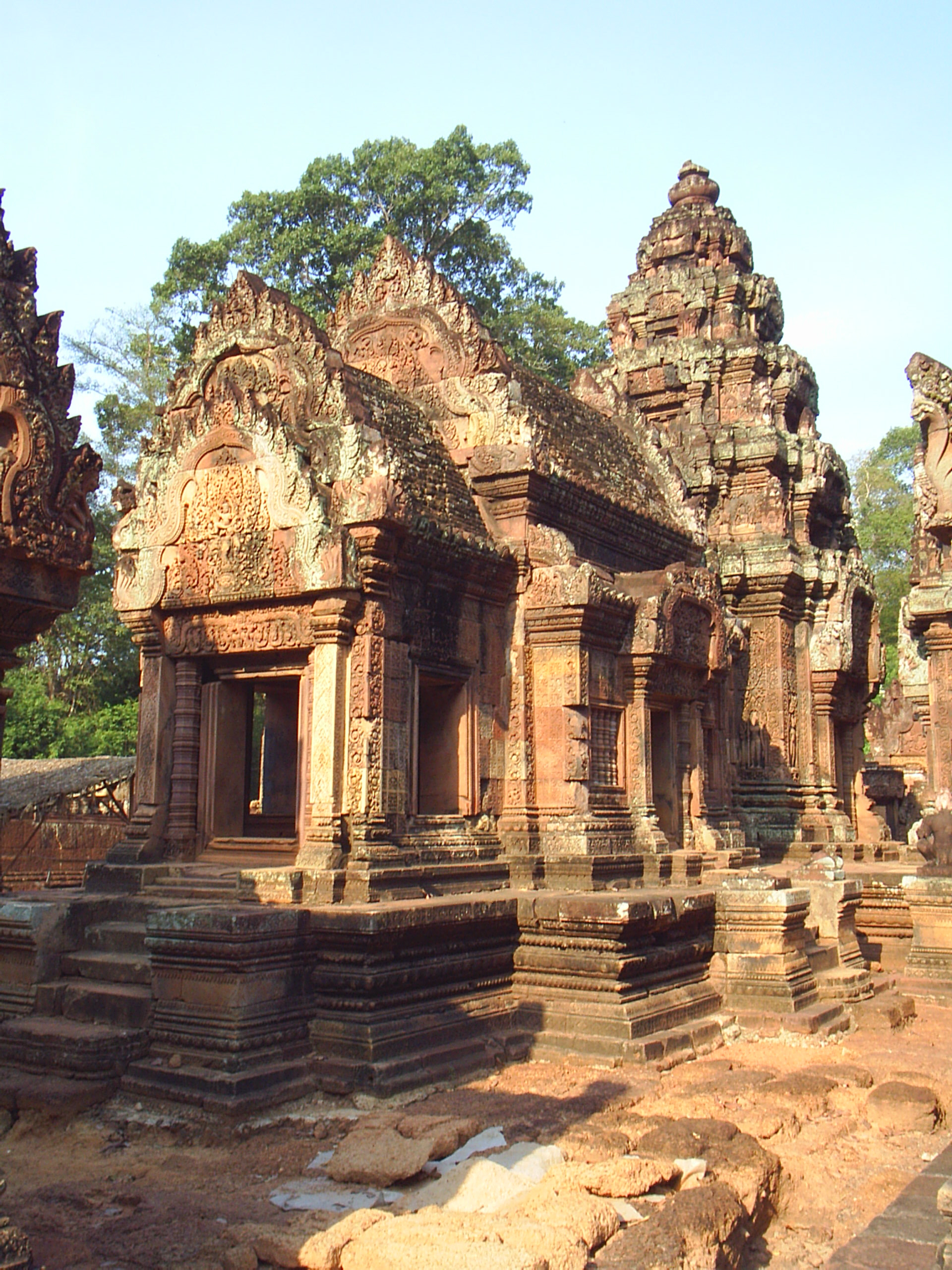
The mandapa and central tower, seen from the northeast

The west-facing pediment on the southern library shows Shiva again seated on the summit of Mount Kailasha. He is looking to his left at the god of love Kamadeva, who is aiming an arrow at him. Parvati sits to Shiva's right and Shiva sits to Parvati's left; he is handing her a chain of beads and she is taking it from him. The slopes of the mountain are crowded with other beings, again arranged in a strict hierarchy from top to bottom. Just under Shiva and Parvati sits a group of bearded wise saints and ascetics, under whom the second tier is occupied by mythological beings with the heads of animals and the bodies of humans; the lowest tier belongs to the common people, who mingle sociably with tame deer, gentle cattle, and other animals. According to the legend, Kamadeva fired an arrow at Shiva in order to cause Shiva to take an interest in Parvati. Shiva and Parvati, however, were greatly disturbed by this provocation as they did not want him to do so, and both destroyed Kamadeva by gazing upon him with their third eyes, burning Kamadeva to ashes and resurrecting him later.

The east-facing pediment on the northern library shows the god of the sky Indra creating enormous rains to put out a forest fire started by the god of fire Agni for purposes of killing the Naga king Takshaka who lived in Khandava Forest. In the Mahabharata, Krishna, the eighth avatara of Vishnu in the Dashavatara of Vishnu and his cousin, the Pandava Arjuna are shown helping Agni by firing a dense hail of arrows to block and destroy Indra's rains. Takshaka's son Ashvasena is depicted attempting to escape from the conflagration and he escapes so, while other animals stampede about in panic and also escape away.

The west-facing pediment on the northern library depicts Vishnu as Krishna killing his own evil maternal uncle Kamsa in Mathura.

==== The sanctuary ====
The sanctuary is entered from the east by a doorway only 1.08 m in height: inside is an entrance chamber (or mandapa) with a corbelled brick roof, then a short corridor leading to three towers to the west: the central tower is the tallest, at 9.8 m. Glaize notes the impression of delicacy given to the towers by the antefixes on each of their tiers. The six stairways leading up to the platform were each guarded by two kneeling statues of human figures with animal heads; most of those now in place are replicas, the originals having been stolen or removed to museums.

== See also ==
- Angkor
- Architecture of Cambodia

== Bibliography ==
- Albanese, Marilia (2006). The Treasures of Angkor (Paperback). Vercelli: White Star Publishers. ISBN 88-544-0117-X.
- Cœdès, George / Dupont, Pierre: «Les stèles de Sdŏk Kăk Thoṃ, Phnoṃ Sandak et Práḥ Vihằr», BEFEO XLIII, 1943, pp. 56–154.
- Finot, Louis / Parmentier, Henri / Goloubew, Victor: Le temple d’Īçvarapura, Paris: G. Vanoest, 1926 (Mémoires archéologiques I).
- Freeman, Michael; Jacques, Claude (2003). Ancient Angkor (Paperback). Bangkok: River Books. ISBN 974-8225-27-5.
- Glaize, Maurice (2003 edition of an English translation of the 1993 French fourth edition). The Monuments of the Angkor Group. Retrieved 14 July 2005.
- Higham, Charles (2001). The Civilization of Angkor. Phoenix. ISBN 1-84212-584-2.
- Inscriptions du Cambodge Éditées et traduites par G[eorge] Cœdès. Vol. I, Hanoi, 1937.
- Jessup, Helen Ibbetson (2004). Art & Architecture of Cambodia. Thames & Hudson. pp. 99–104.
- Polkinghorne, Martin (2008). Khmer decorative lintels and the allocation of artistic labour, in Arts Asiatiques 63: 21–35.
- Roveda, Vittorio (1997). Khmer Mythology: Secrets of Angkor. New York: Weatherhill (this work should be used with caution. While it is thorough in its treatment of Angkorian representational art, and contains many useful photographs, it is sometimes inaccurate in its characterization of the underlying Indian myths, and does not reflect a thorough investigation of sources for those myths).
- Bruno Bruguier, Jean-Baptiste Chevance, Olivier Cunin, (2020). Les "marches d'Angkor". Guide archéologique du Cambodge, tome 6, JSRC. ISBN 9789995055547.
- APSARA Authority. Banteay Srei
- German Angkor Imagery Project: Banteay Srei
- Banteay Srei Photo Gallery
