= Yajnavaraha =

Cambodian royal physician

Yajnavaraha (10th century) was priest-doctor and a royal physician at the court of king Rajendravarman in Angkor, Cambodia, practising traditional Cambodian medicine and Ayurveda. He was of royal descent and was the grandson of King Harshavarman I. Most of his learning was from his father Damodara, who was a vedic scholar. He was known for his religious contributions and helping the poor. He was rewarded for this with a parasol of peacock feathers. He was also a musician and an astronomer at the royal court. Along with his younger brother, Vishnukumara, he commissioned the erection of a Shaivite temple called Isvarapura or Banteay Srei, 15 miles north of Angkor Wat. He went on to become the guru of King Jayavarman V and practised ayurvedic medicine at the royal court. He was given the title vrah guru (holy spiritual master) by Jayavarman V.

== See also ==
- Traditional Cambodian medicine
