= Sunda and Upasunda =

Asura brothers in the Mahabharata

- Mahabharata character
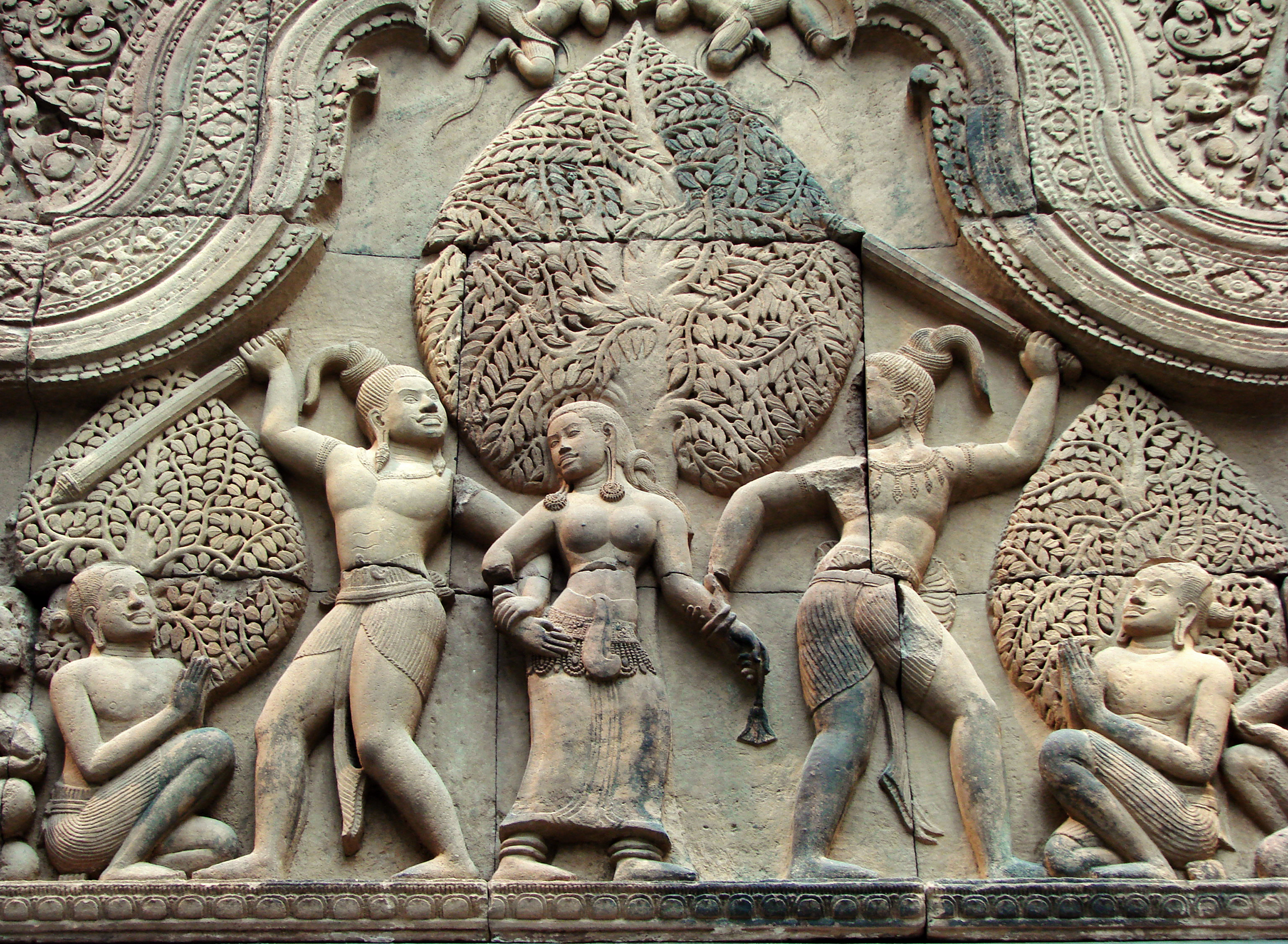
- Cambodian carving depicting the Asura brothers Sunda and Upasunda fighting over Tilottama

Information
- Affiliation: Asura
- Family: Nikumbha (father)

Sunda (Sanskrit: सुन्द) and Upasunda (Sanskrit: उपसुन्‍द) are asura brothers featured in the Hindu epic Mahabharata. They are the sons of Nikumbha. They are the descendants of Hiranyakashipu.

== Legend ==
The brothers Sunda and Upasunda once performed severe austerities upon the Vindhya mountains. Finally, Brahma agreed to grant the brothers a boon, and they sought immortality. This boon was not granted by Brahma. The inseparable brothers chose the boon of being completely invulnerable, except that they could be killed by each other. Leaving the mountains, Sunda and Upasunda slaughtered a number of Brahmins, and threatened the existence of the Vedic religion. Brahma was stirred into action. He instructed Vishvakarma to produce before him the perfect courtesan and he created the beautiful apsara, Tilottama. This damsel was instructed to cause dissent between the brothers. Tilottama found Sunda and Upasunda in the countryside with their retinue, drinking, and celebrating their victories. Beholding Tilottama, they immediately fell to fighting over her, and ended up killing each other. Hence, order was established once more.
