= Apsara =

Type of female spirit of the clouds and waters in Hindu and Buddhist culture

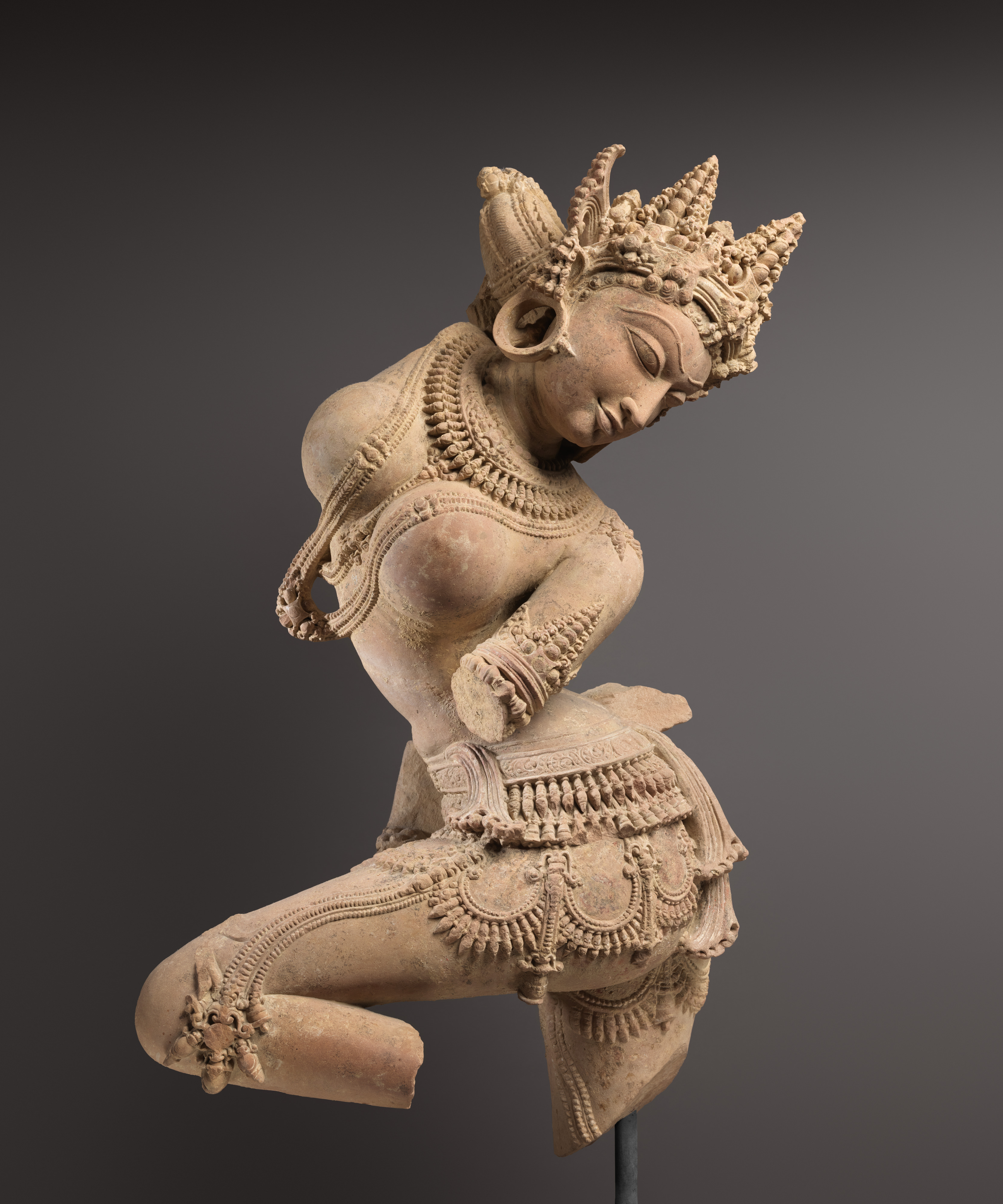
A 12th-century sandstone statue of an apsara from Madhya Pradesh, India

Apsaras (Sanskrit: अप्सरस्, IAST: Apsaras, Khmer: អប្សរា, romanized: Ăpsăra, Pali: अच्छरा, romanized: Accharā, Thai: อัปสร, romanized: Apsara) are a class of celestial beings in Hindu and Buddhist culture. They were originally a type of female spirit associated with clouds and water, but, later came to play the role of a "nymph" or "fairy". They figure prominently in the sculpture, dance, literature and paintings of many South Asian and Southeast Asian cultures.

The apsaras are described as being beautiful, youthful and elegant, and are said to be able to change their shape at will; making anyone fall for their beauty. There are two types of apsaras—laukika (worldly) and daivika (divine). They are said to excel at dancing, and are often considered the wives of the gandharvas, the court musicians of Indra. The apsaras reside in the palaces of the gods and entertain them by dancing to the music of the Gandharvas. The 26 apsaras of Indra's court are each said to symbolise a different facet of the performing arts, drawing comparisons to the Muses of Ancient Greece. They are also renowned for seducing rishis in order to prevent them from attaining divine powers. Famous apsaras include Urvashi, Menaka, Rambha, Tilottama and Ghritachi.

In Japan, Apsara are known as "Tennin" (天人); "Tennyo" (天女) for "female Tennin" and "Tennan" (天男) for "male Tennin".

== Etymology ==
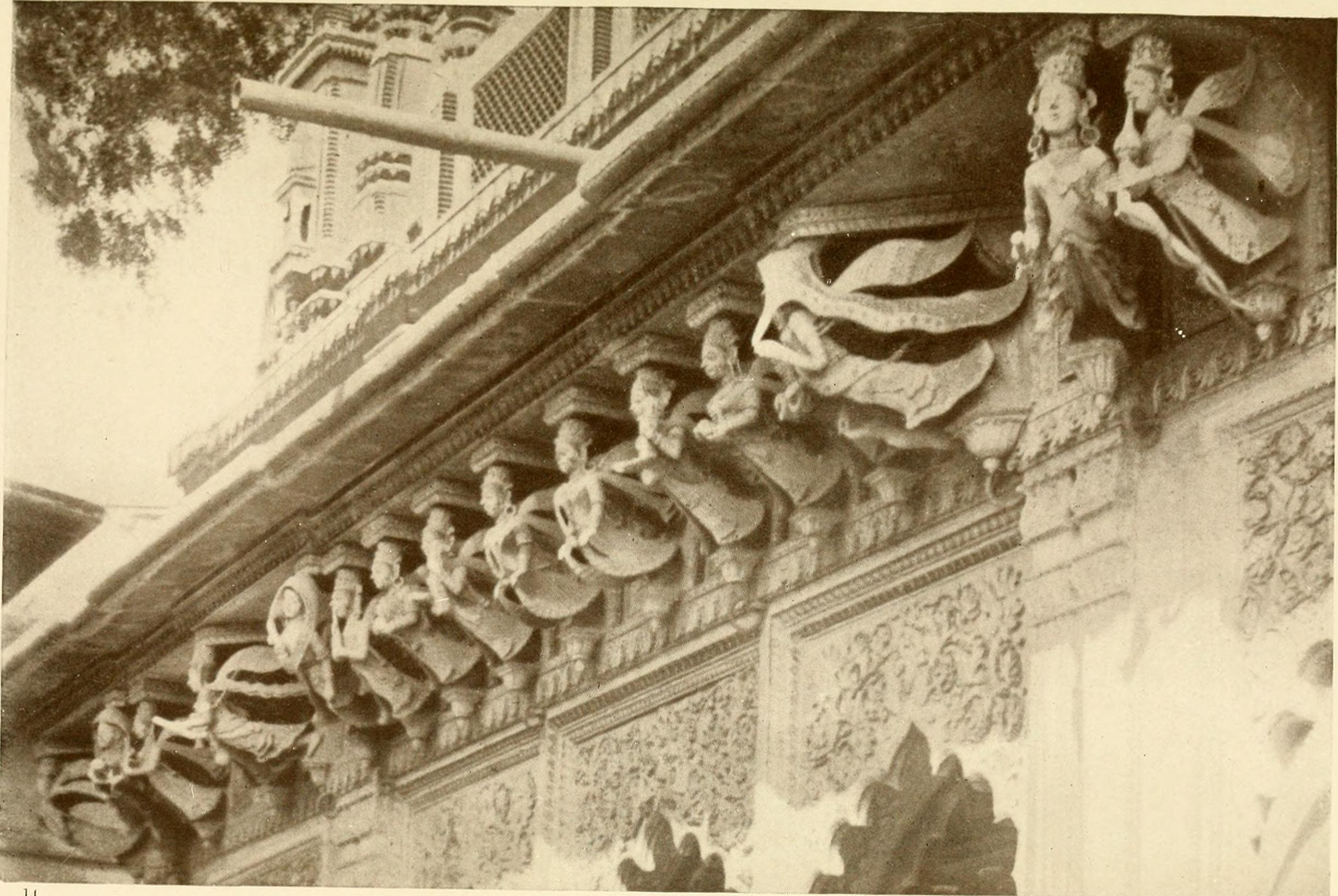
Apsaras on Hindu Temple at Banares, 1913

The origin of 'apsara' is the Sanskrit अप्सरस्, apsaras (in the stem form, which is the dictionary form). Note that the stem-form ends in 's' as distinct from, e.g. the nominative singular Rāmas / Rāmaḥ (the deity Ram in Hindi), whose stem form is Rāma. The nominative singular form is अप्सरास् apsarās, or अप्सरा: apsarāḥ when standing alone, which becomes अप्सरा apsarā in Hindi, from which in turn the English "apsara" presumably is derived. The Monier-Williams et al. (1899) gives the etymology as अप् + √सृ, "going in the waters or between the waters of the clouds".

The "Apsaras" are widely known as Apsara. Including, In Javanese, Sundanese, and Balinese: Hapsari / Apsari or Widadari / Widyadari; In Khmer: អប្សរា (Âbsâréa); In Malay and Maranao: Bidadari; In Meitei: Helloi; In Pali: Accharā; In Tausug and Sama–Bajaw: Biraddali; and In Thai: อัปสร (RTGS: Apson).

== Literature ==
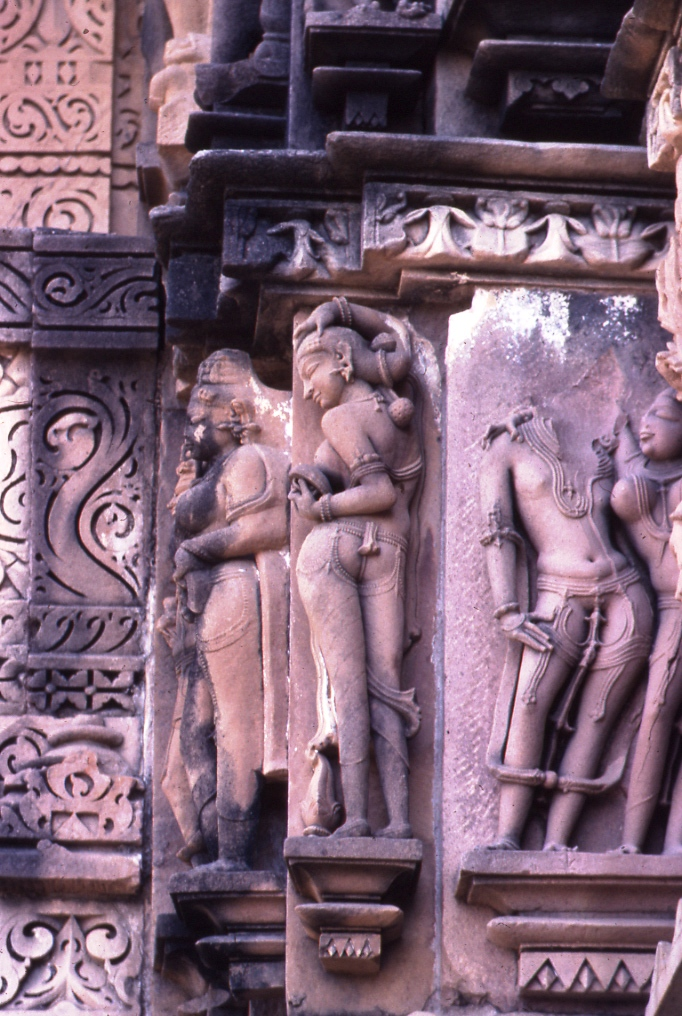
Apsara, Devi Jagadambi temple at Khajuraho in Madhya Pradesh, India

The most ancient descriptions of apsara portray them as "water nymph"-like beings.

The Rigveda tells of an apsara who is the wife of Gandharva; however, the Rigveda also seems to allow for the existence of more than one apsara. The only apsara specifically named is Urvashi. An entire hymn deals with the colloquy between Urvashi and her mortal lover Pururavas. Later Hindu scriptures allow for the existence of numerous apsaras, who act as the handmaidens of Indra or as dancers at his celestial court serving as musicians alongside the gandharvas ("celestial musicians").

The Kaushitaki Upanishad mentions apsaras as a class of divinities associated with ointments, garlands, vestments, and powdered aromatics.

The origin of the apsaras is described in the Ramayana and Puranas. Apsaras are further associated with water by relating them to the churning of the ocean, water sports, and groups such as nāgas.

In many of the stories related in the Mahabharata, apsaras appear in important supporting roles. The epic contains several lists of the principal Apsaras, which lists are not always identical. Here is one such list, together with a description of how the celestial dancers appeared to the residents and guests at the court of the gods:

Ghritachi, Menaka, Rambha, Tilottama, Purvachitti, Swayamprabha, Urvashi, Misrakeshi, Dandagauri, Varuthini, Gopali, Sahajanya, Kumbhayoni, Prajagara, Chitrasena, Chitralekha, Saha, and Madhuraswana—these and thousands more, possessed of eyes like lotus leaves, were employed in enticing the hearts of individuals practicing rigid austerities, and they danced there. And possessing slim waists and fair large hips, they began to perform various evolutions, shaking their deep bosoms, and casting their glances around, and exhibiting other attractive attitudes capable of stealing the hearts and resolutions and minds of the spectators.

The Mahabharata documents the exploits of individual apsaras, such as Tilottama, who rescued the world from the rampaging asura brothers Sunda and Upasunda; and Urvashi, who attempted to seduce the hero Arjuna.

A recurring theme in the Mahabharata is that of an apsara sent to distract a sage from his ascetic practices. One story embodying this theme is that recounted by the epic heroine Shakuntala to explain her own parentage. Once upon a time, the sage Vishvamitra generated such intense energy by means of his asceticism that Indra himself became fearful. Deciding that the sage would have to be distracted from his penances, he sent the apsara Menaka to work her charms. Menaka trembled at the thought of angering such a powerful ascetic, but she obeyed the god's order. As she approached Vishvamitra, the wind god Vayu tore away her garments. Seeing her thus disrobed, the sage abandoned himself to lust and they had sex, during which Vishvamitra's asceticism was put on hold. As a consequence, Menaka gave birth to a daughter, whom she abandoned on the banks of a river. That daughter was Shakuntala herself, the narrator of the story.

Shu Ting referenced apsara in her poem "O Motherland, Dear Motherland".

== In arts ==
Many Indian apsaras were identified with names and were central in myths. However, since they were not attributed specific physical features or attributes, artistic depictions do not individualize them.

=== Gandhara ===
In Gandhāran art they are originally portrayed as winged beings placing garlands at a stupa, the original symbolic depiction of the Buddha before more anthropomorphic imagery was developed. Then later once this had occurred, they are depicted crowning the Buddha in a similar manner to Nike crowning the gods of Ancient Greece, and it is speculated that the imagery of Nike was the main influence on the development of Apsara imagery. This in turn was adapted, adjusted and developed into the Feitian dancing-girl imagery found in Chinese Buddhism detailed below.

=== Natya Shastra ===
Natya Shastra, the principal work of dramatic theory for Sanskrit drama, lists the following apsaras: Manjukesi, Sukesi, Misrakesi, Sulochana, Saudamini, Devadatta, Devasena, Manorama, Sudati, Sundari, Vigagdha, Vividha, Budha, Sumala, Santati, Sunanda, Sumukhi, Magadhi, Arjuni, Sarala, Kerala, Dhrti, Nanda, Supuskala, Supuspamala and Kalabha.

=== Cambodia ===
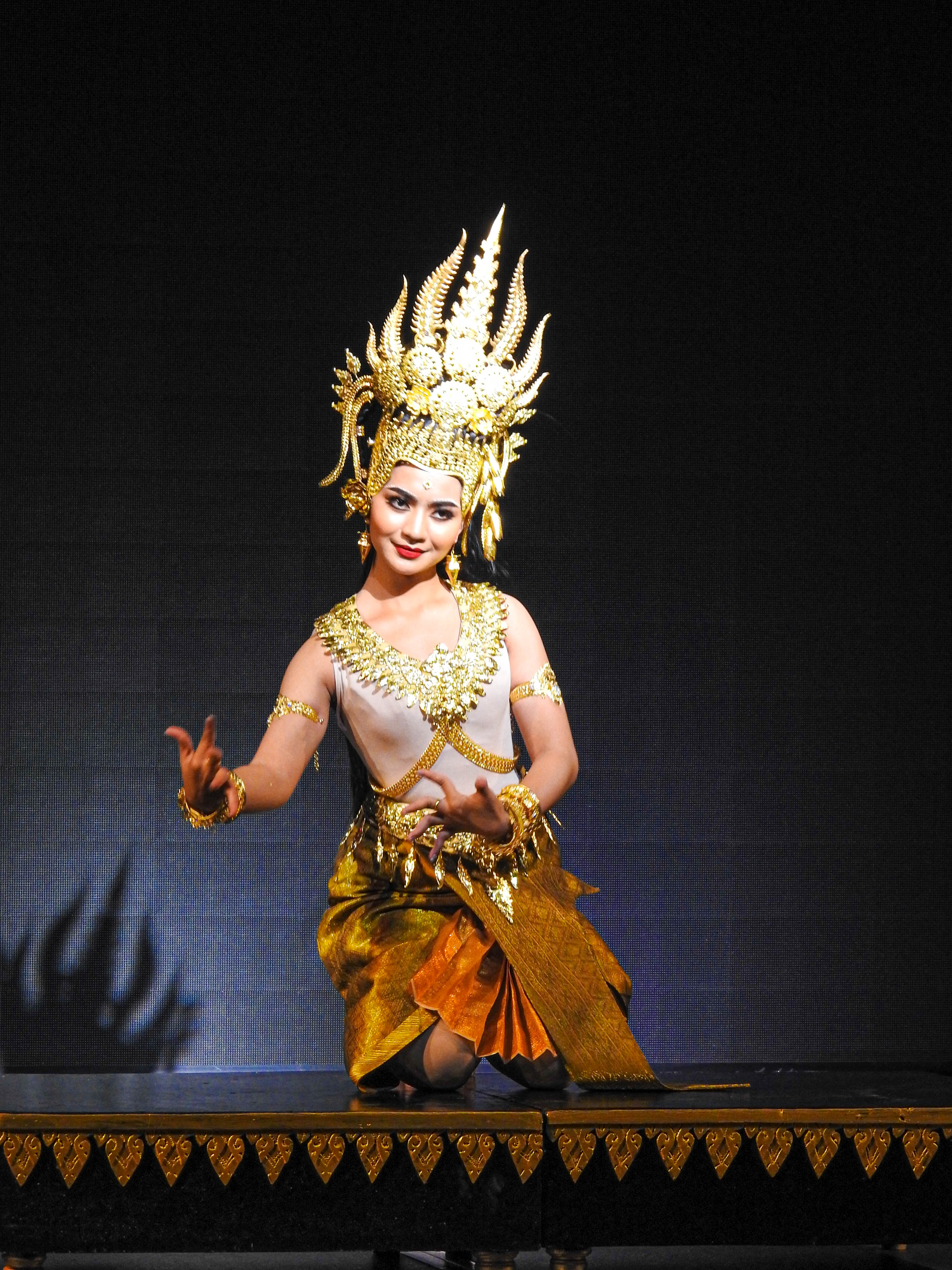
Cambodia Apsara Dancer

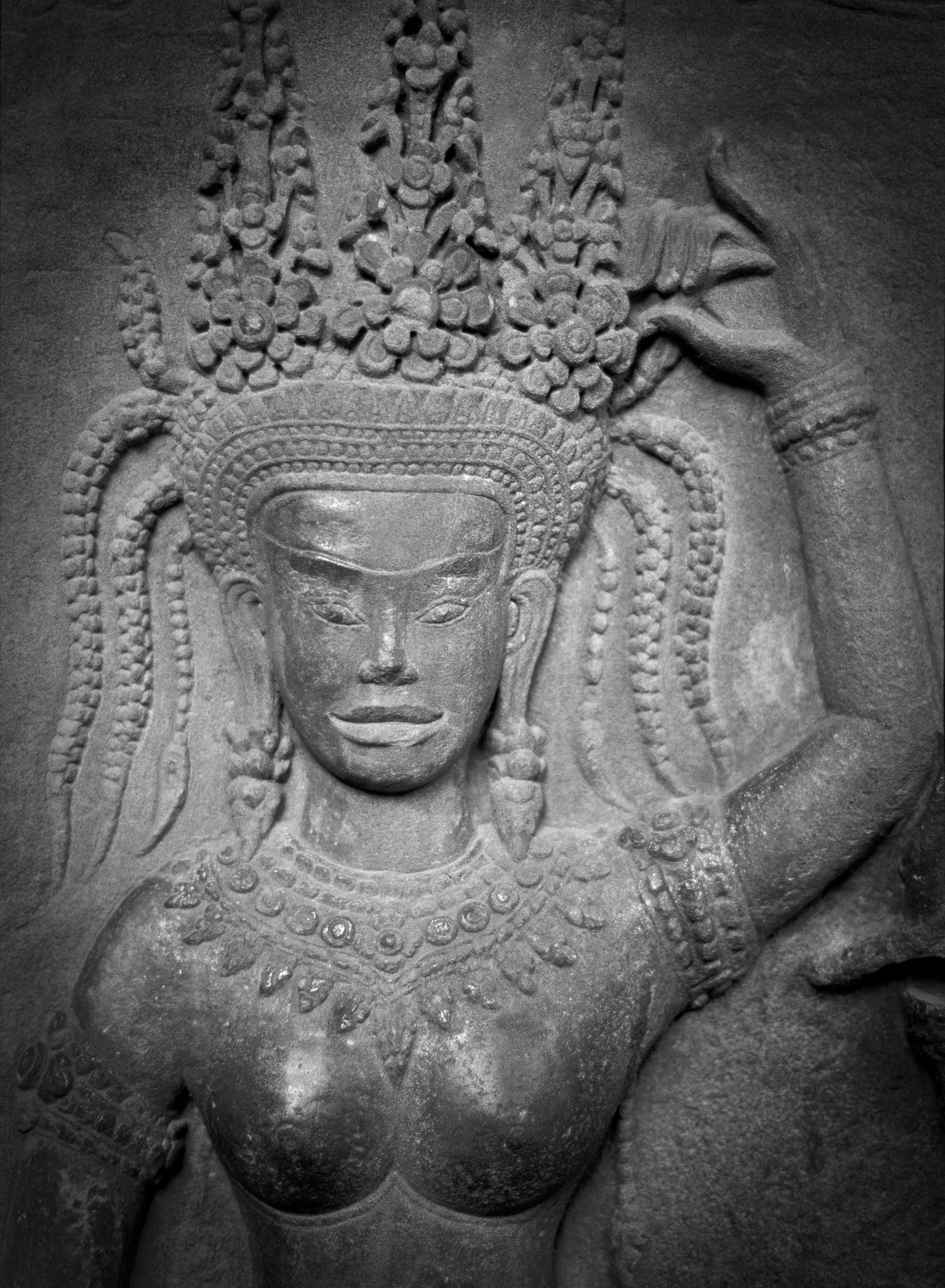
Apsara relief sculpture on Angkor Wat temple wall

Apsaras represent an important motif in the stone bas-reliefs of the Angkorian temples in Cambodia (8th–13th centuries AD). The shapely, celestial nymphs appeared from the foam that emerged out of the Churning of the Sea of Milk, from the Hindu creation myth. However, not all female images are considered to be apsaras. In harmony with the Indian association of dance with apsaras, Khmer female figures that are dancing or are poised to dance are considered apsaras; female figures, depicted individually or in groups, who are standing still and facing forward in the manner of temple guardians or custodians are called devatas.

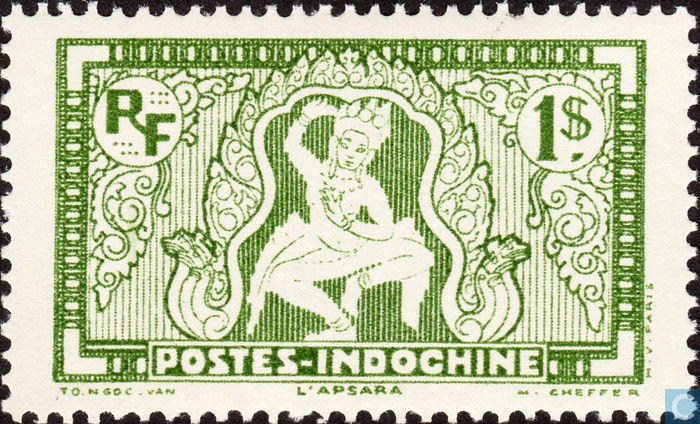
Apsara on a 1931 postage stamp of Indochina

Angkor Wat, the largest Angkor temple (built in 1113–1150 AD), features both Apsaras and Devata, however, the devata type are the most numerous with more than 1,796 in the present research inventory. Angkor Wat architects employed small apsara images (30–40 cm as seen below) as decorative motifs on pillars and walls. They incorporated larger devata images (all full-body portraits measuring approximately 95–110 cm) more prominently at every level of the temple from the entry pavilion to the tops of the high towers. In 1927, Sappho Marchal published a study cataloging the remarkable diversity of their hair, headdresses, garments, stance, jewelry and decorative flowers, which Marchal concluded were based on actual practices of the Angkor period. Some devatas appear with arms around each other and seem to be greeting the viewer. "The devatas seem to epitomize all the elements of a refined elegance," wrote Marchal.

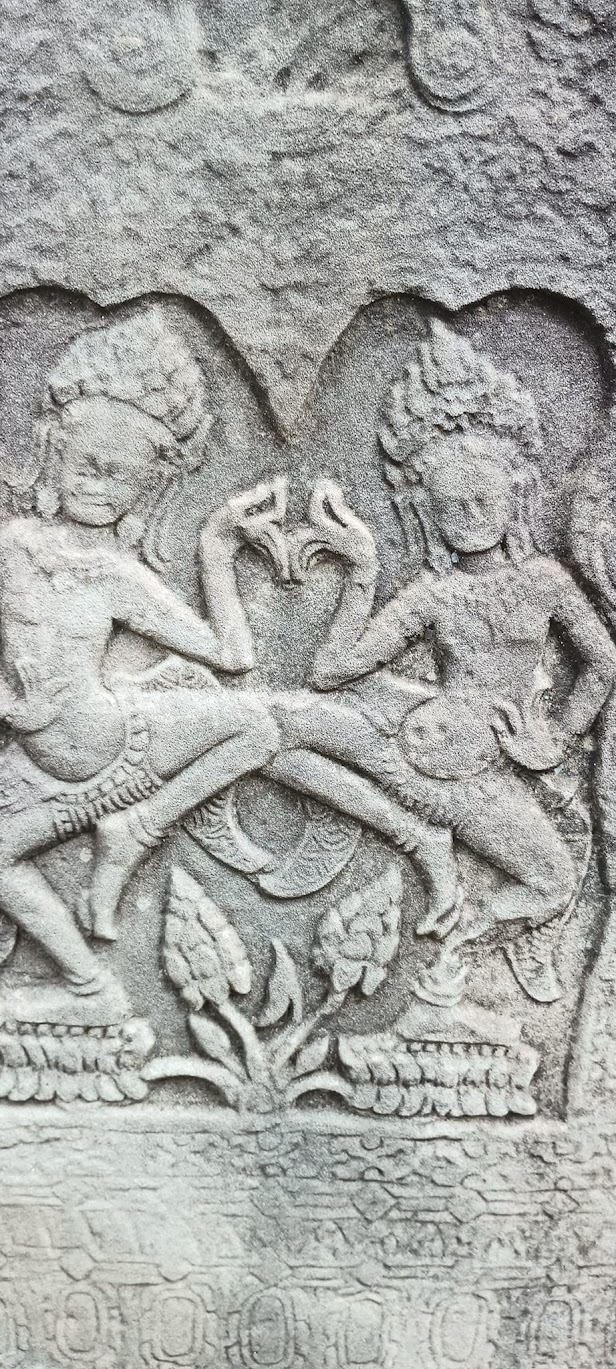
A pair of dancing apsaras on a Bayon pillar.

The Bayon temple, built by King Jayavarman in the late 12th-early 13th century, featured some 6,250 of the dancing apsaras. Mostly found carved into the temple's pillars, these celestial women are usually depicted dancing on lotus flowers, representing a mythical world. The apsaras portrayed dancing on the ground may represent real women performing for ritual purposes, especially when surrounded by musicians.

Within Ta Prohm temple at Angkor, a pavilion on its eastern axis is adorned almost entirely in lifelike bas-reliefs. With 96 pillars and three welcoming porches on both sides for entrance, the structure earns the name Hall of Dancers from its multiple lintels featuring dancing apsaras in long rows.

The bas-reliefs of Angkorian temples have become an inspiration of Khmer classical dance. The indigenous ballet-like performance art of Cambodia is frequently called "Apsara Dance". The dance was created by the Royal Ballet of Cambodia in the mid-20th century under the patronage of Queen Sisowath Kossamak of Cambodia. The role of the apsara is played by a woman, wearing a tight-fitting traditional dress with gilded jewelry and headdress modelled after Angkor bas-reliefs, whose graceful, sinuous gestures are codified to narrate classical myths or religious stories.

=== Java and Bali, Indonesia ===
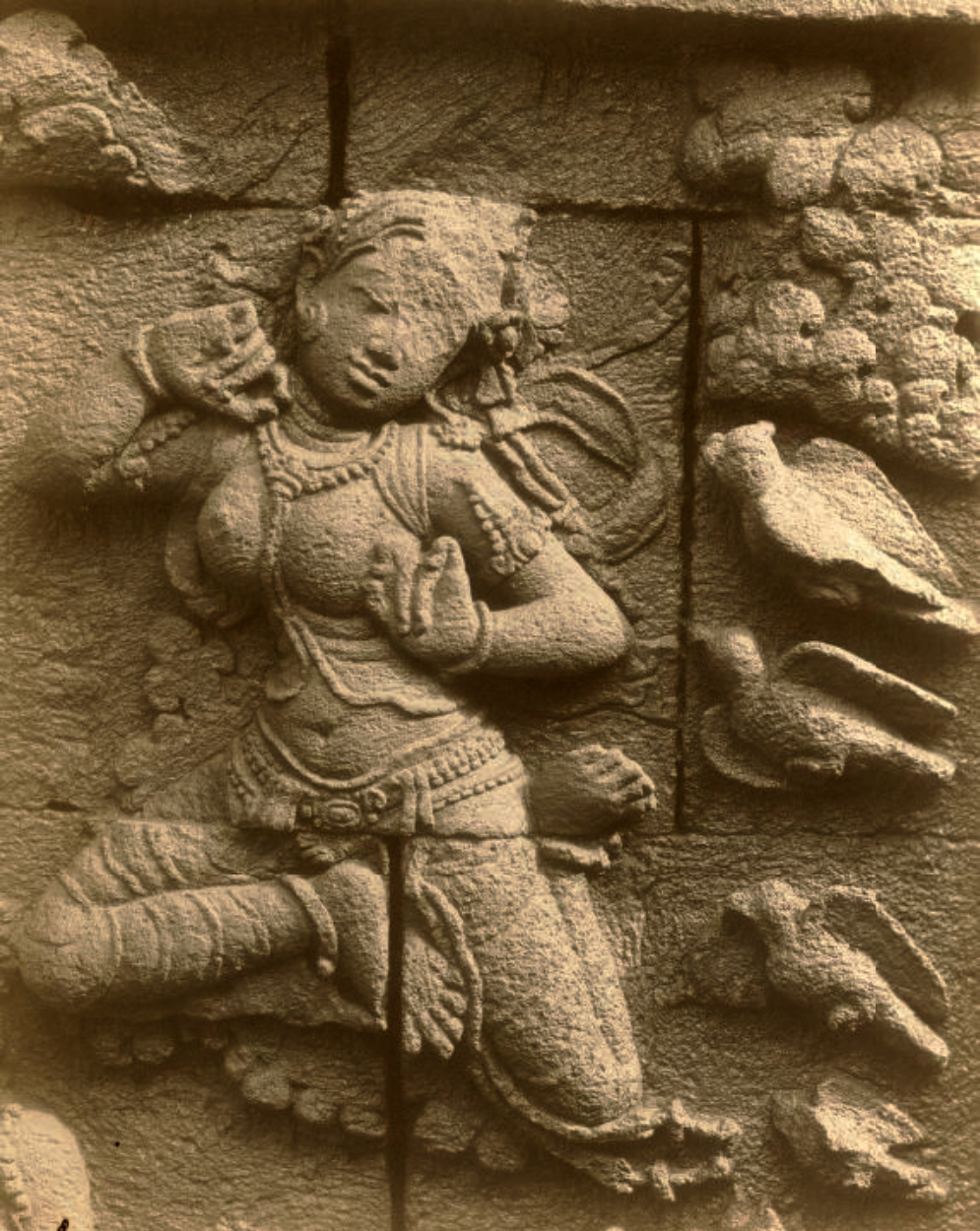
The Apsara of Borobudur, the flying celestial maiden depicted in a bas-relief of the 9th-century Borobudur temple, Java, Indonesia

In the Indonesian language throughout medieval times, apsaras are also known as 'bidadari', being conflated with the 'vidyadharis' (from Sanskrit word vidhyadhari: vidhya, 'knowledge'; dharya, 'having, bearer, or bringer') known as Bidadari in the modern Indonesian, the females of the vidyādharas, another class of celestial beings in Indian mythology. 'Vidyādhara' literally means 'possessed of science or spells', and refers to 'a kind of supernatural being ... possessed of magical power' or 'fairy' according to Monier-Williams' dictionary. The bidadaris are heavenly maidens, living in the svargaloka or in celestial palace of Indra, described in Balinese dedari (bidadari or apsara) dance.

Traditionally apsaras are described as celestial maidens living in Indra's heaven (Kaéndran). They are well known for their special task: being sent to earth by Indra to seduce ascetics who by their severe practices may become more powerful than the gods. This theme occurs frequently in Javanese traditions, including the Kakawin Arjunawiwaha, written by mpu Kanwa in 1030 during the reign of king Airlangga. The story tells that Arjuna, in order to defeat the giant Niwatakawaca, engaged in meditation and asceticism, whereupon Indra sent apsaras to seduce him. Arjuna, however, managed to conquer his lust and then to win the ultimate weapons from the gods to defeat the giant.

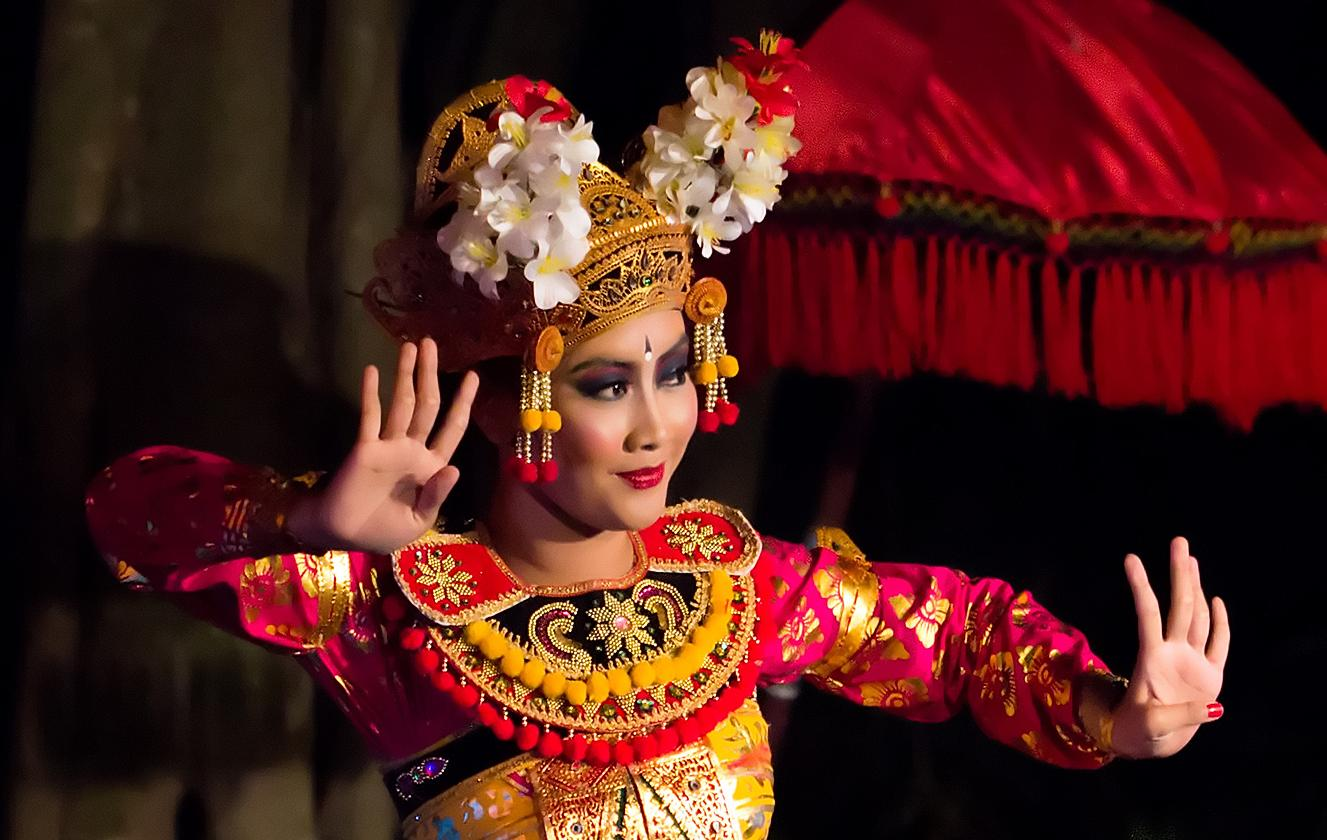
The Balinese Legong dance depict celestial maidens, Bali, Indonesia.

Later in the Javanese tradition the apsara was also called Hapsari, also known as Widodari (from Sanskrit word vidyādhari). The Javanese Hindu-Buddhist tradition also influenced Bali. In Balinese dance, the theme of celestial maidens often occurs. Dances such as Sanghyang Dedari and Legong depicted divine maidens in their own way. In the court of Mataram Sultanate the tradition of depicting heavenly maidens in dances is still alive and well. The Javanese court dances of Bedhaya portray apsaras.

However, after the adoption of Islam, bidadari is equated with houri, the heavenly maiden mentioned in the Quran, in which God stated that the 'forbidden pearls' of heaven are for those men who have resisted temptation and borne life's trials. Islam spread in the Malay archipelago when Arabic traders came to trade spices with the Malays; at that time, Hinduism formed the basis of the Malay culture, but syncretism with the Islamic religion and culture spawned the idea of a Bidadari. It is usually seen as a prize offered to those who lived a lifestyle in service to and pleasing to God; after death, the Bidadari was the man's wife or wives, depending on what type of person he was. The worthiness of a man who was offered Bidadari depended upon his holiness: how often he prayed, how much he turned away from the 'outside world', and how little he heeded worldly desires.

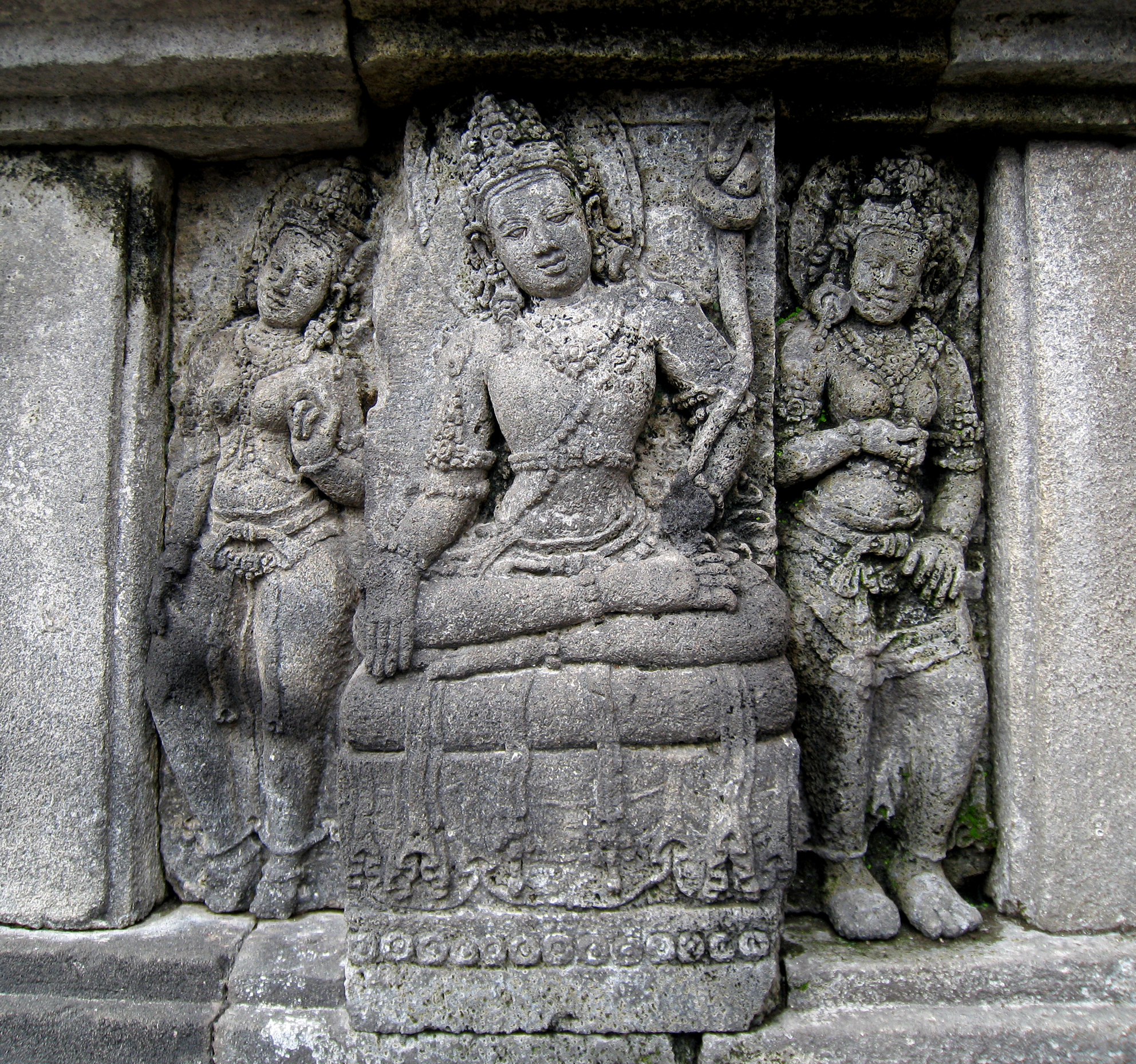
A male devata flanked by two apsaras, Vishnu temple, Prambanan, Java

Images of apsaras are found in several temples of ancient Java dating from the era of the Sailendra dynasty to that of the Majapahit empire. The apsara celestial maidens might be found as decorative motifs or also as integral parts of a story in bas-relief. Images of apsaras can be found on Borobudur, Mendut, Prambanan, Plaosan, and Penataran.

At Borobudur apsaras are depicted as divinely beautiful celestial maidens, pictured either in standing or in flying positions, usually holding lotus blossoms, spreading flower petals, or waving celestial clothes as if they were wings enabling them to fly. The temple of Mendut near Borobudur depicted groups of devatas, divine beings flying in heaven, which included apsaras. In the Prambanan temple compound, especially in Vishnu temple, along with the gallery, some images of male devata are found flanked by two apsaras.

=== Manipur, India ===
In the ancient Manipur culture of the Meitei people of northeastern India, apsaras are considered as celestial nymphs or hellois as the flying creatures resembling the human female body attracting the male wanderers or any knights who lost their ways in the woods. They were known for their beauty, glamour, magical powers and enchanting supernatural Androphilic Magnetism. They are believed to be seven in number and are the daughters of the sky god or the Soraren deity.

=== Champa ===
Apsaras were also an important motif in the art of Champa, medieval Angkor's neighbour to the east along the coast of what is now central Vietnam. Especially noteworthy are the depictions of apsaras in the Tra Kieu Style of Cham art, a style which flourished in the 10th and 11th centuries AD.

=== China ===
Apsaras are often depicted in East Asian Buddhist art. They are referred to as Feitian (simplified Chinese: 飞天; traditional Chinese: 飛天) in Chinese.

They are depicted as flying figures in the mural paintings and sculptures of Buddhist cave sites in China such as in the Mogao Caves, Yulin Caves, Tianlongshan grottoes, the Yungang, and Longmen Grottoes. They are also depicted on tiles of pagoda, such as Xiuding-si pagoda.

They may also be depicted as dancers or musicians holding musical instruments such as flute, pipa, or sheng. Apsara may be portrayed as multiple spirits who played music for Buddhas. Generally, they are depicted with a long skirt fluttering in the wind.

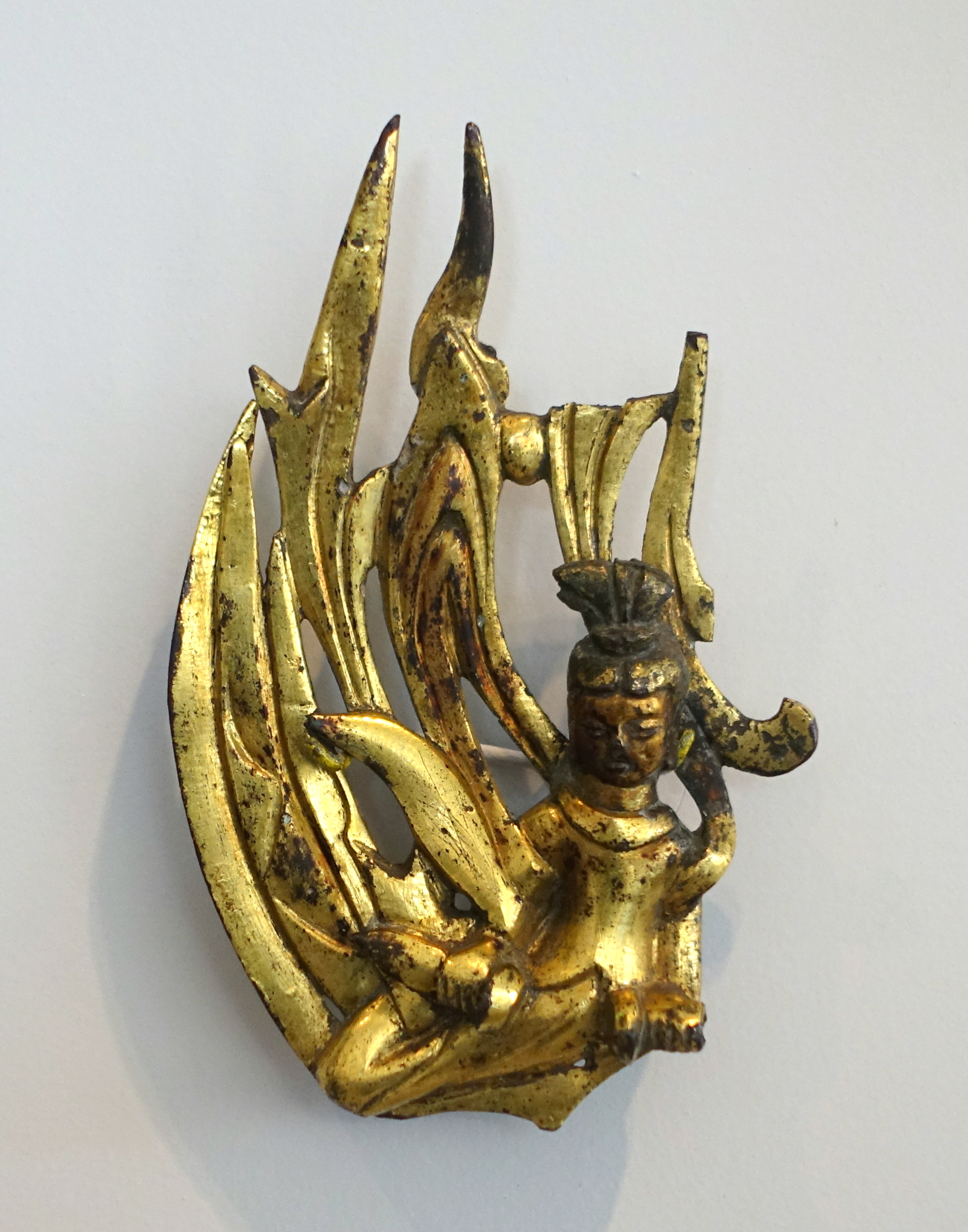
Apsara (Feitian), China, Northern or Eastern Wei dynasty, 500–550 AD

Apsara is sometimes portrayed as a single powerful and influential spirit or god who wears an outfit with "flowing sleeves" and lives in Tian. This version of Apsara is used in Chinese folk religion as an object of worship and in Chinese folklore.

== Gallery ==
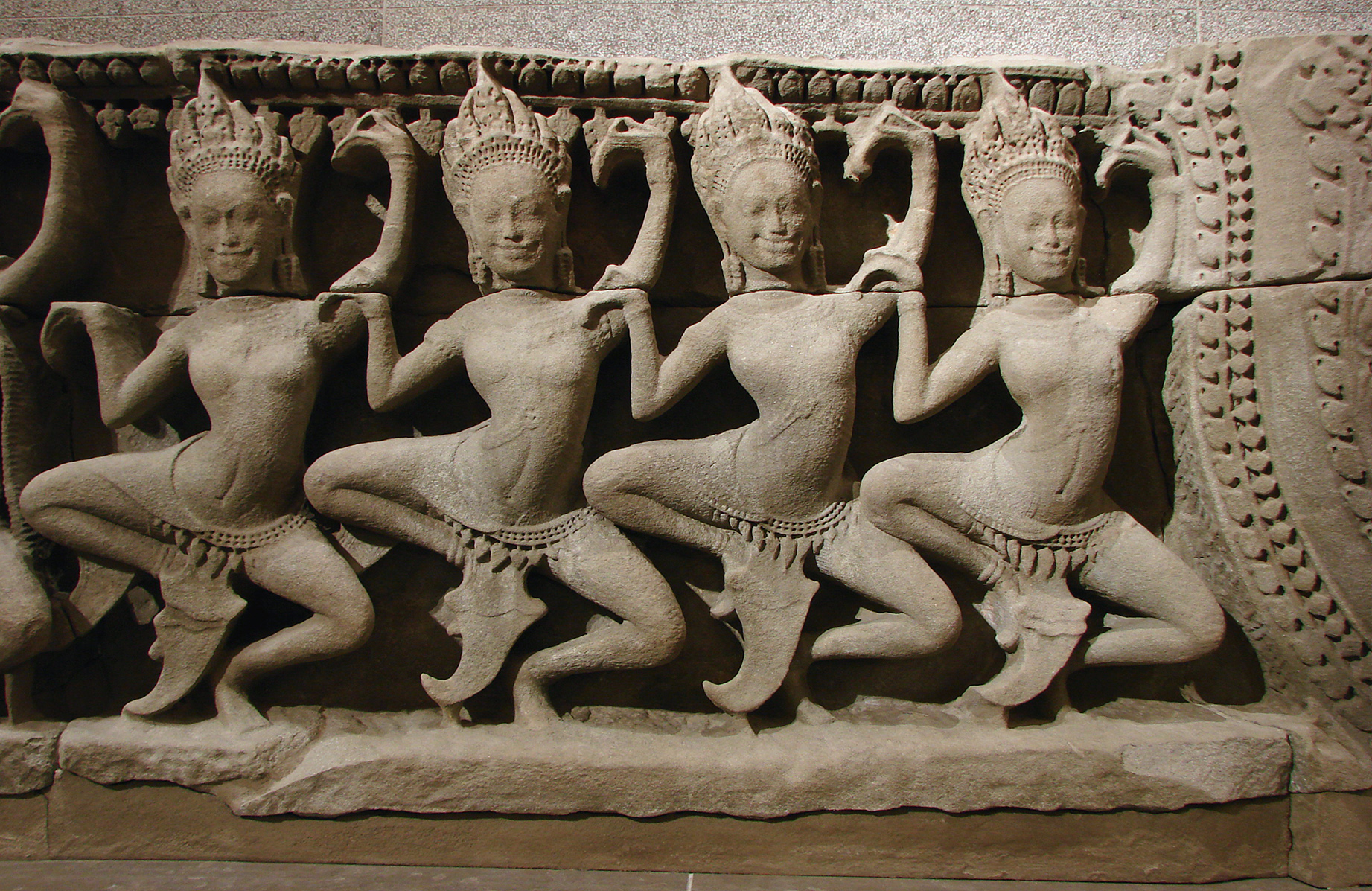
Apsaras dance taken from the 12th-century Bayon temple at Angkor in Cambodia

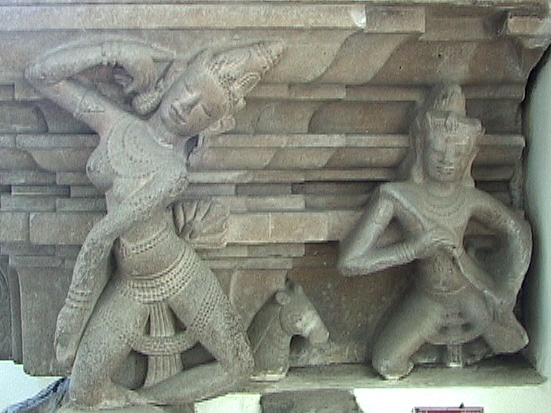
Apsaras are depicted on the base of the Tra Kieu Pedestal, a work of 10th-century Cham art.

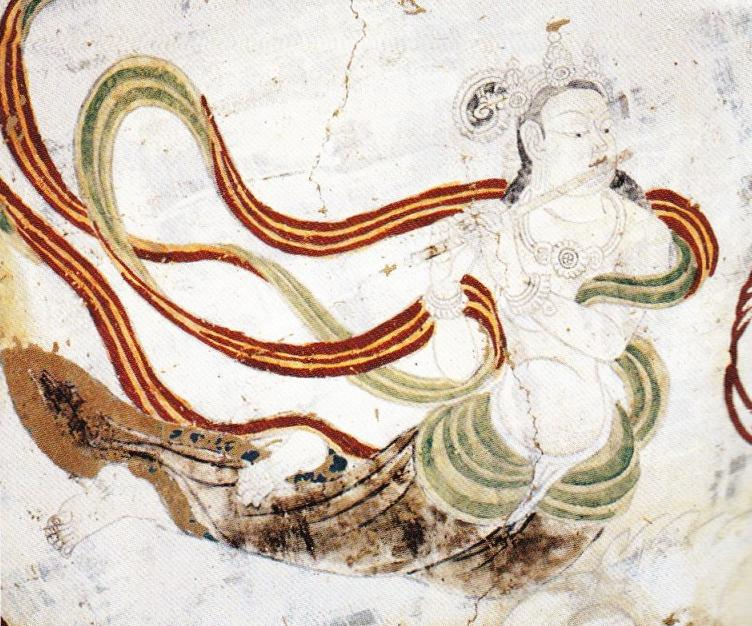
Apsara from Yulin Caves near Dunhuang, China

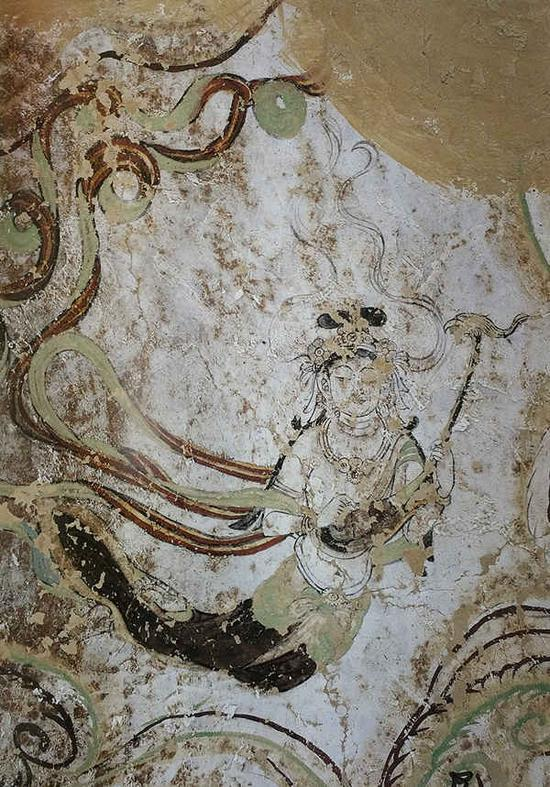
Apsara playing a Phoenix-headed konghou – Yulin Cave 15

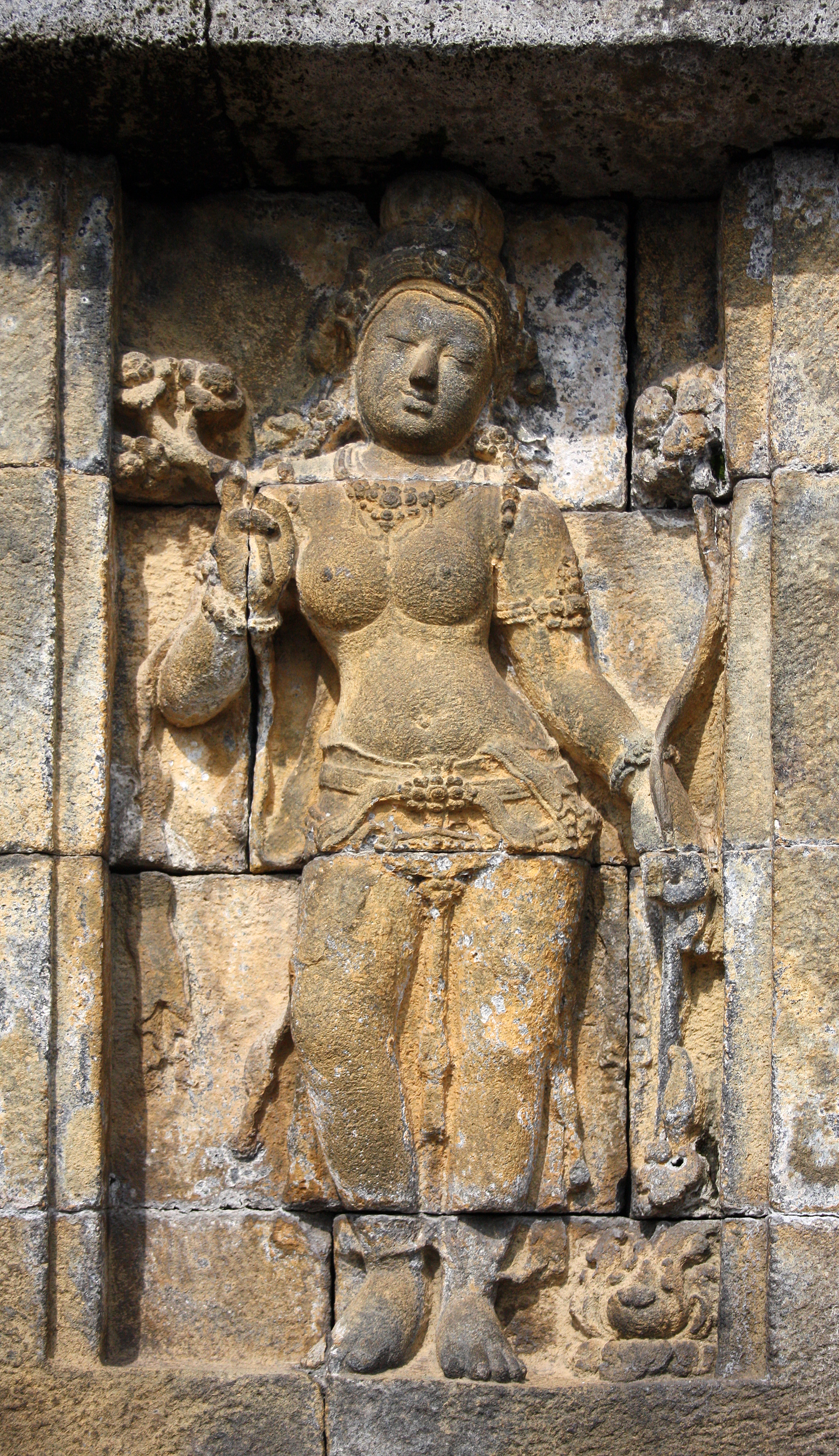
Apsara Surasundari in Borobudur

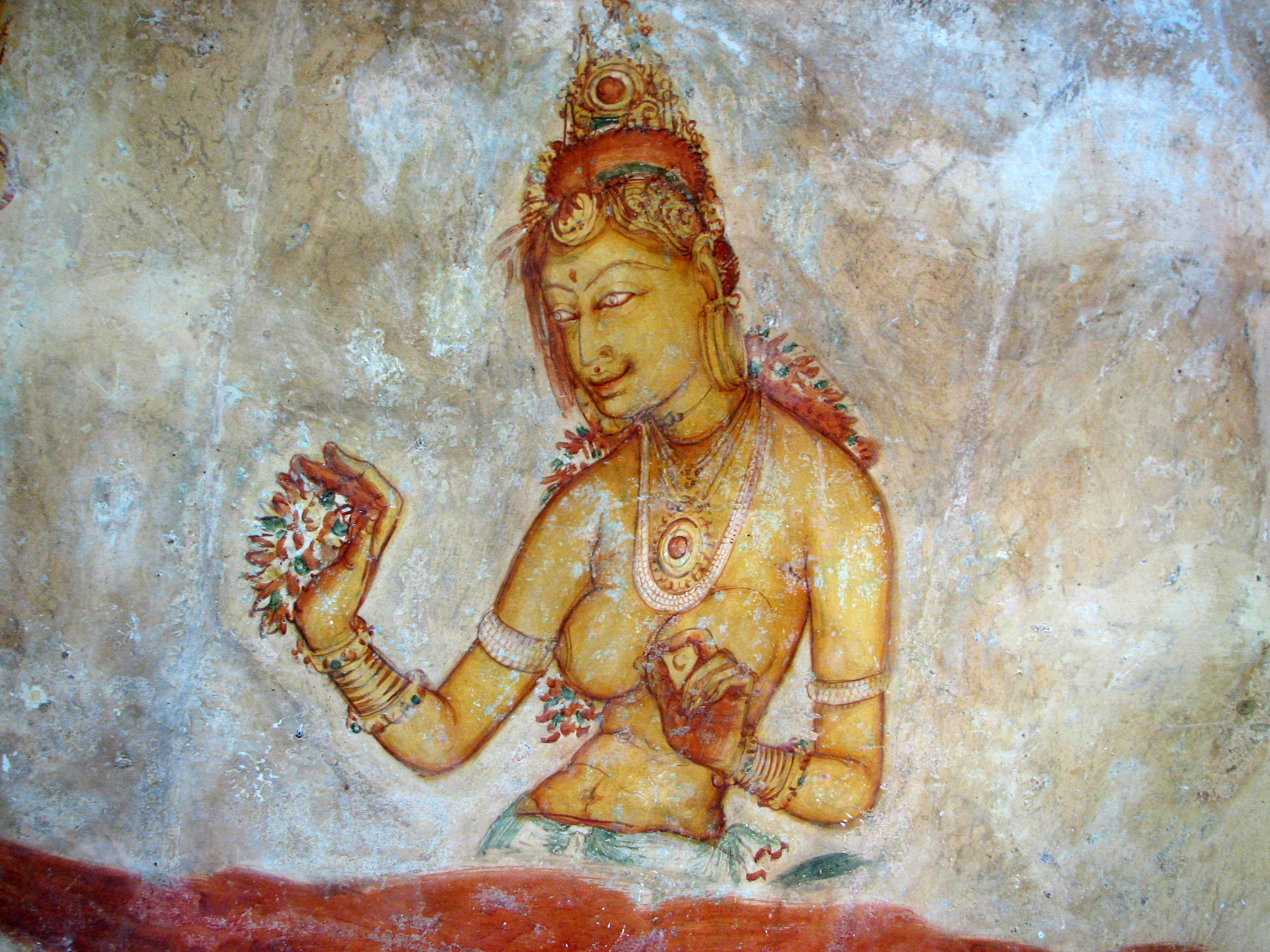
Painting of Apsara at Sigiriya, Sri Lanka

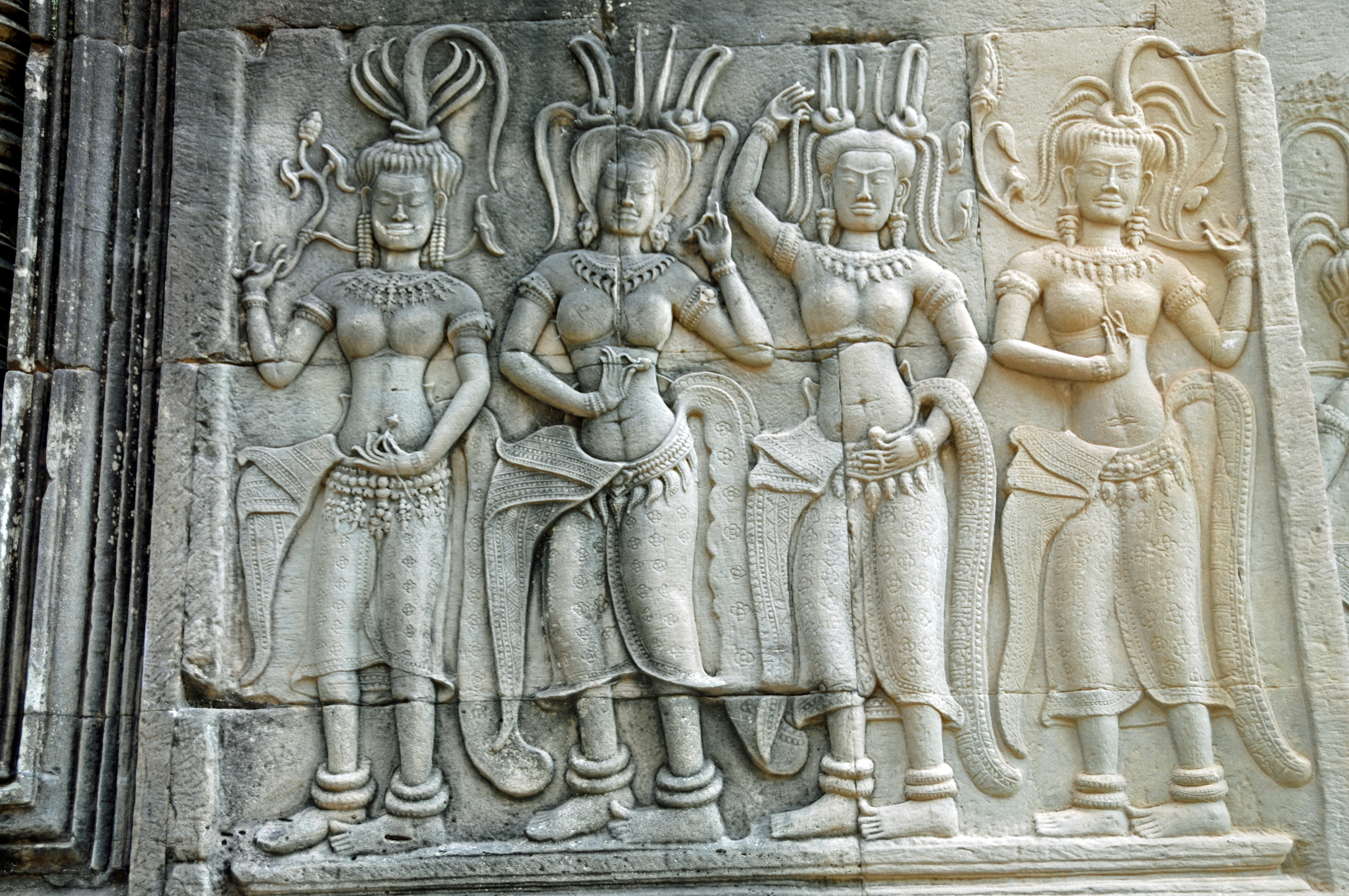
Apsara relief sculpture at Angkor Wat

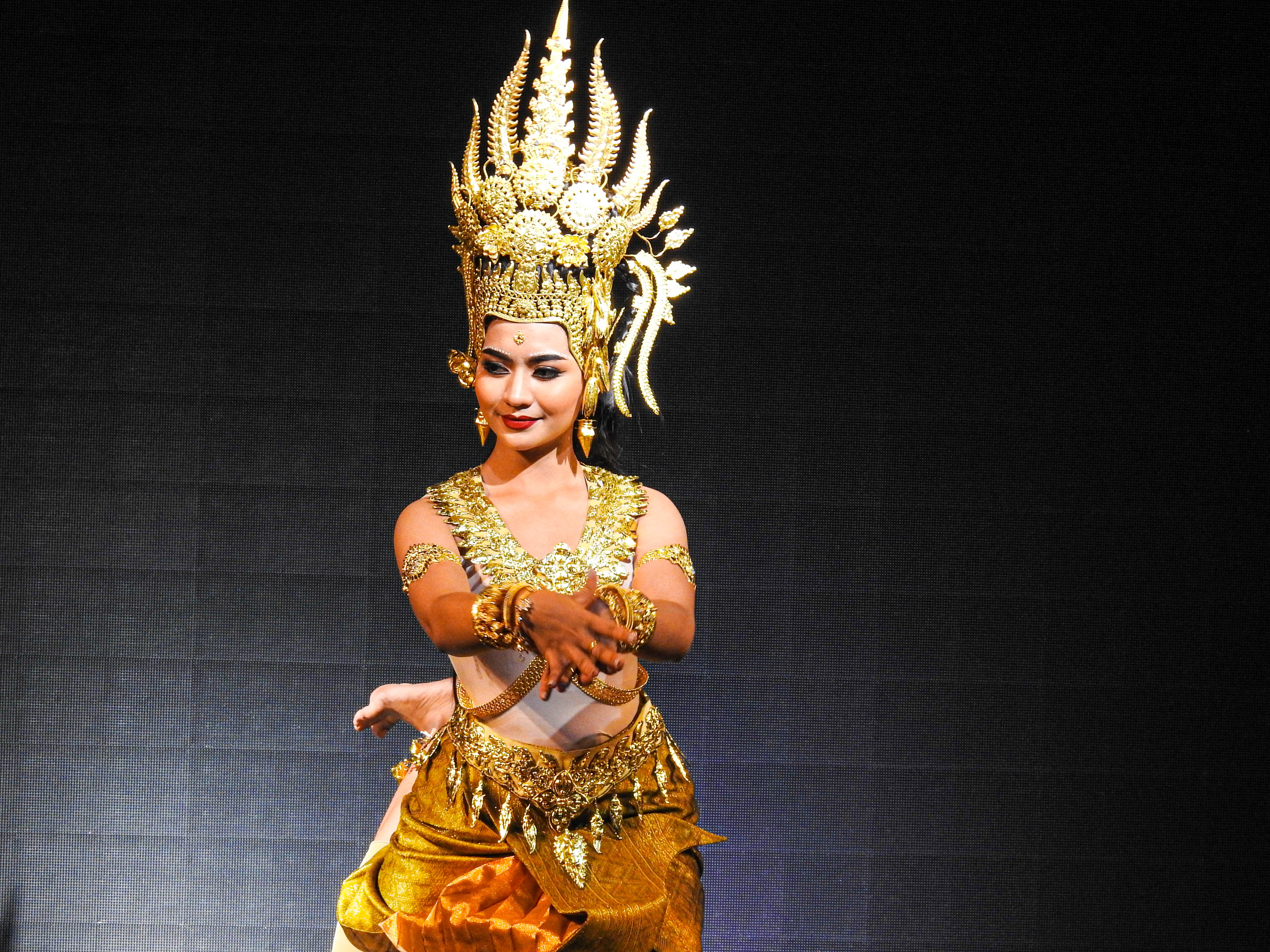
Cambodia Apsara dance

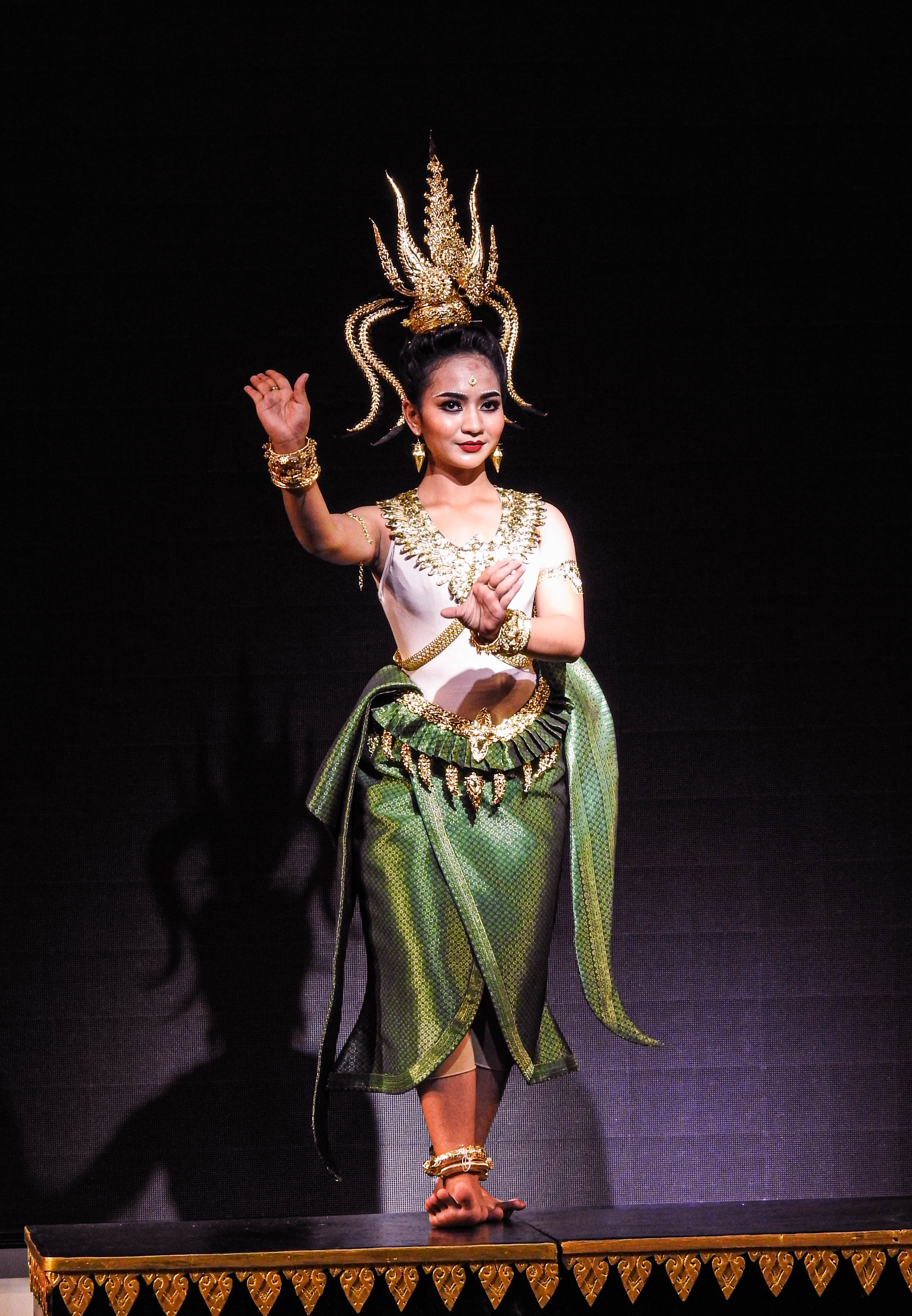
Cambodia apsara dancer

== See also ==
- Angel
- Angkor Wat
- Art of Champa
- Dakini
- Devata
- Dunhuang dance
- Elf
- Fairy
- Gandharva - Celestial male companions of the apsaras
- Houri
- Nymph
- Peri, winged female creatures of Persian mythology
- Rusalka
- Swan maiden
- Tennin, a Japanese development of Indian apsaras
- Valkyrie from Norse mythology
- Vidyadhara
- Yakshini
