= Tilottama =

Apsara in Hindu mythology

- Apsara
- Devanagari: तिलोत्तमा
- Sanskrit transliteration: Tilottamā
- Associate: Vishvakarma (creator)
- Abode: Svarga

Tilottama (Sanskrit: तिलोत्तमा, romanized: Tilottamā), is an apsara (celestial nymph) described in Hindu mythology.

"Tila" is a Sanskrit word for a small particle and "uttama" means the ultimate. Tilottama, therefore, means the being whose smallest particle is the finest or one who is composed of the finest and highest qualities.

In the Hindu epic Mahabharata, Tilottama is described to have been created by the divine architect Vishvakarma, at Brahma's request, by taking the best quality of everything as the ingredients. She is responsible for bringing about the mutual destruction of the asuras (a class of malevolent beings), Sunda and Upasunda. Even devas (a class of benevolent beings) like Indra are described to be enamoured of Tilottama.

While a legend talks about a pre-birth as an ugly widow, another narrates how she was cursed to be born as a daitya princess Usha by sage Durvasa.

== Legend ==
=== Death of Sunda and Upasunda ===
In the Adi Parva (Book 1) of the epic Mahabharata, the divine sage Narada tells the Pandava brothers the story of the destruction of asura brothers Sunda and Upasunda due to the apsara Tilottama and warns the Pandavas that their common wife Draupadi could be a reason of quarrel between them. The tale states Sunda and Upasunda were sons of the asura Nikumbha. They are described as inseparable siblings who shared everything: the kingdom, the bed, food, house, a seat. Once, the brothers practiced severe austerities on the Vindhya mountains, compelling the creator-god Brahma to grant them a boon. They asked for great power and immortality, but the latter was denied, instead, Brahma gave them the boon that nothing but they themselves can hurt each other. Soon, the asuras attacked Svarga and drove the devas out. Conquering the whole universe, the asuras started harassing sages and creating havoc in the universe.

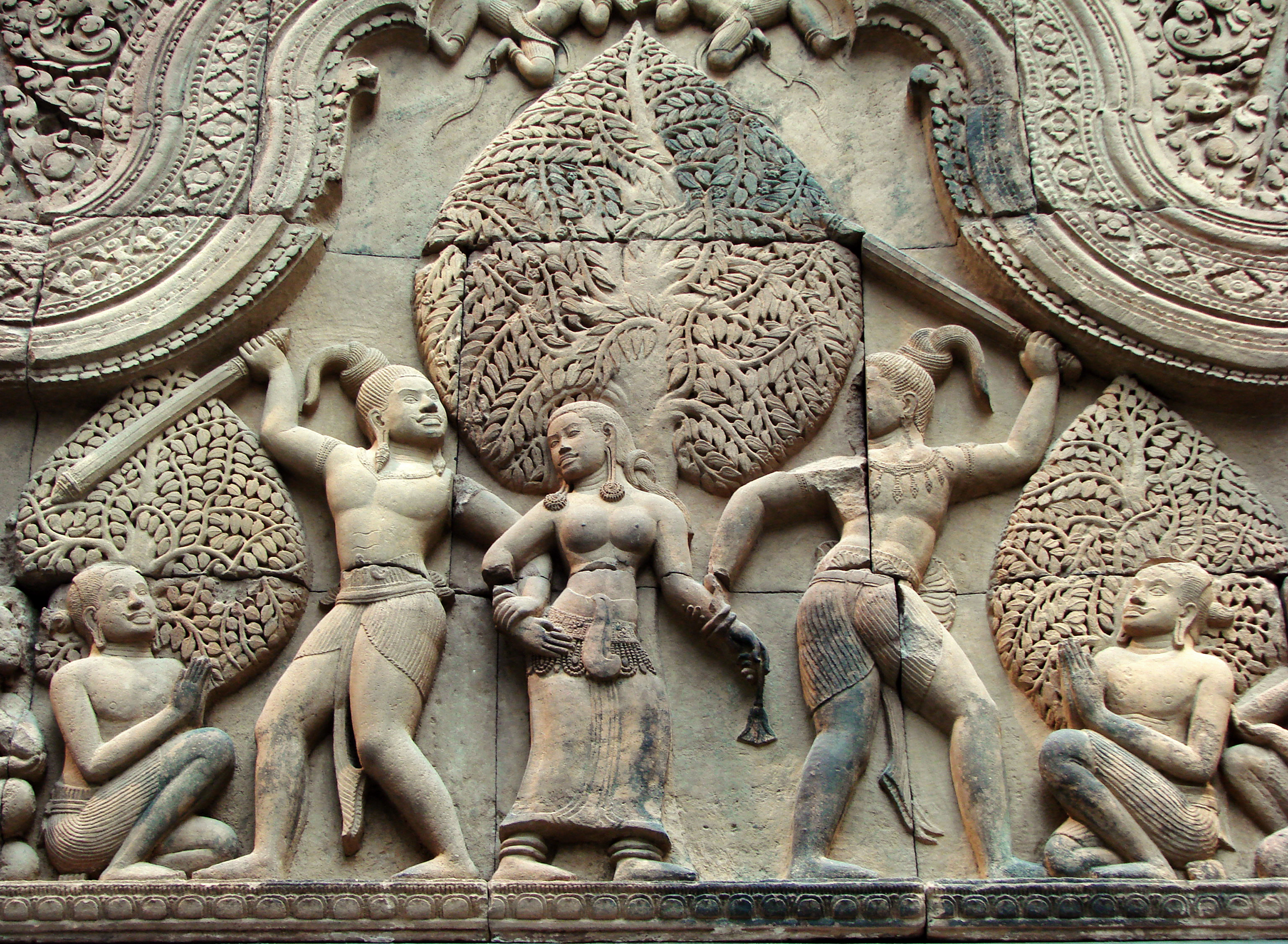
The asuras Sunda and Upasunda fighting over the apsara Tilottama, a pediment from Banteay Srei Temple, Cambodia

The devas and seers sought refuge with Brahma. Brahma then ordered the divine architect Vishvakarma to create a beautiful woman. Vishvakarma collected all that was beautiful from the three worlds (Svarga, earth, Patala) and all the gems of the world and created an alluring woman - with unrivalled beauty - from them. As she was created bit by bit from the gems, Brahma named her Tilottama and directed her to seduce the asura brothers to the extent that she would become an issue of contention between them.

As Sunda and Upasunda were enjoying a dalliance with women and engrossed in drinking liquor along a riverbank in the Vindhya mountains, Tilottama appeared there plucking flowers. Bewitched by her voluptuous figure and drunk with power and liquor, Sunda and Upasunda took hold of Tilottama's right and left hands respectively. As both of the brothers argued that Tilottama should be his own wife, they grabbed their clubs and attacked each other, ultimately killing each other. The devas congratulated her and Brahma granted her the right to roam freely in the universe as a boon. Brahma also decreed that no one would be able to look at her for a long time due to her luster.

=== Enchantress of the devas ===
The Mahabharata (Book 1: Adi Parva) narrates: Though Brahma was unaffected by Tilottama's beauty, the other devas were spell-bound by her beauty. Initially, Shiva and Indra remain unperturbed, however, so great was the desire of the great god Shiva (referred to as "Sthanu" - the firm one) to see her, a head developed on both his sides and back of his head as she circumambulated him as a mark of reverence. The king of Svarga, Indra, however, developed a thousand red eyes on his body to see her. Another legend describes sage Gautama cursing Indra for seducing his wife Ahalya. Gautama decreed that Indra would develop a thousand vulvae on his body, but they change to thousand eyes once Indra lays his eyes on Tiliottama.

Another tale in the Mahabharata (Book 13) narrates that Tilottama comes to tempt Shiva. Eager to see her as she circumambulated him, Shiva developed four visible faces, another interpretation states that Shiva revealed himself to Tilottama as the five Brahmans, with his five faces (4 visible, 1 invisible). The east face signifying his sovereignty over the world, the north face to sport with Parvati, the west to ensure the happiness of creatures; the south face, to destroy the universe and the fifth face was invisible as it was beyond the comprehension of Tilottama. Another legend from the Puranas says Brahma created Tilottama and was aroused by her. He makes five heads in order to see her and then sends her to Mount Kailash, the abode of Shiva, to pay her obeisance to him. Shiva glances at her but avoids carefully looking at her as his consort Parvati was seated beside him. As Tilottama circumambulated Shiva, he develops a head in each direction to see her. The divine sage Narada taunts Parvati, "You can imagine what Shiva is thinking about this woman who is reviled by wise men". Agitated, Parvati covers Shiva's eyes with her hands submerging the universe in darkness. Shiva then develops the third eye to bring light to the universe.

=== Curse to king Sahasranika ===
The Kathasaritsagara, the 11th century Sanskrit translation of the 1st-2nd century Paishachi text Brihatkatha, tells how king Sahasranika was cursed by Tilottama. As the king was returning from Indraloka to his kingdom, Tiliottama told him to wait so she could tell an interesting fact, but the king engrossed in the thoughts of his sweetheart - the apsara Alambusa, ignored what Tilottama said. Infuriated by the king's conduct, Tilottama cursed the king that he would suffer separation from the one he was thinking about - for a period of fourteen years.

=== Previous birth and rebirth ===
The Padma Purana narrates that Tilottama was an ugly widow named Kubja in her previous birth. Kubja underwent auspicious ceremonies for eight years and finally performing the ritual Magha puja. This ensured that she was born as Tiliottama and appeared in Svarga as an apsara.

The Brahma Vaivarta Purana narrates that Sahasika, grandson of Bali disturbed sage Durvasa's penance in his amours with Tilottama. As the result, the sage turned him into a donkey and cursed Tilottama, to be born as asura Banasura's daughter Usha. Usha would later become the wife of Aniruddha, the grandson of Krishna.

== In popular culture ==
Her tale was made into a movie in 1954, by Homi Wadia, Directed by Babubhai Mistry, starring Chitra, Kailash, Maruti, B. M. Vyas, Babu Raje and Indira Bansal.
