= Vastupala =

13th century Vaghela prime minister

Vastupāl
- Died: 1240 CE; Ankevalia (now in Gujarat, India)
- Spouse: Lalitādevī, Sokhukādevī
- Issue: Jayantasiṃha
- Father: Aśvarājā
- Mother: Kumāradevī
- Occupation: Minister in Vaghela court

Vastupāla (died 1240 CE) was a prime minister of the Vāghelā king Vīradhavala and his successor Vīsaladeva, who ruled in what is now the Gujarat region of India, in the early 13th century. Although he served in an administrative and military capacity, he was also a patron of art, literature and public works. He, together with his brother Tejapāla, (Note: Also spelled Tejaḥpāla in some inscriptions.) assisted in the restoration of peace in the kingdom, and served in a number of campaigns against Lāṭa, Godraha, Kutch and the Delhi Sultanate. The brothers were instrumental in the construction of the Luniga-vasahi temple on Mount Abu and the Vastupala-vihara on Girnar.

== Ancestry and family ==
Vastupala and his brother Tejapala were born to a Pragavata, or Porwad as they are known today, Jain family in Anahilavada Patan (modern day Patan, Gujarat). Vijayasenasuri, a Jain monk of Nagendra Gachchha, was their clan guru. Extensive information on their ancestry has been drawn from literary works and inscriptions: in Naranarayanananda, Vastupala referred to Chandapa as his ancestor and this descent has been expanded upon in Prabandha-kosha and Puratana-prabandha-sangraha.

Chandapa was a minister, probably in the Chaulukya court, where his son Chandaprasada also served as a minister. Jaishree, Chandaprasada's wife, bore him two sons, Sura and Soma, who became a jewel keeper to the Chaulukya ruler, Jayasimha Siddharaja. Soma's wife, Sita, bore him one son, Ashwaraja (or Asharaja). (Note: No other sources mention these ancestors, who probably held ministerial ranks, but likely did not wield the same influence as Vastupala and Tejapala.) Later in life, Ashwaraja became a minister and married Kumaradevi, a daughter of Abhu, a Pragvata vanika and a dandapati (commander-in-chief) by profession. Kumaradevi was apparently (Note: This was first noted by Merutunga and also mentioned in three Old Gujarati poems titled Vastupala-Rasa by Laksmisagara, Parshwachandra and Meruvijaya. Puratana-prabandha-sangraha also mentions that she was a child widow. Old Gujarati texts also mention that this widow remarriage split the Pragavatas into two branches: Vriddha-shakha ('old' or 'superior' branch, modern Visa branch) and Laghu-shaka ('new' or 'inferior' branch, modern Dasa branch).) a widow when she married Ashwaraja; however, this has been disputed. (Note: C. D. Dalal and M. D. Desai argue that it does not appear in any contemporary sources and was added by later authors. Sandesara rebuts that contemporary writers may have avoided writing information that was deemed critical but later writers would not feel the same compunction.)

The couple had eleven children — seven daughters: Jalhu (or Bhau or Jalu), Mau, Sau, Dhanadevi, Sohaga, Vaijuka (or Tejuka) and Padmaladevi; and four sons: Luniga, Malladeva, Vastupala and Tejapala. Luniga died in childhood while Malladeva died after fathering a son, Purnasimha.

== Early life ==
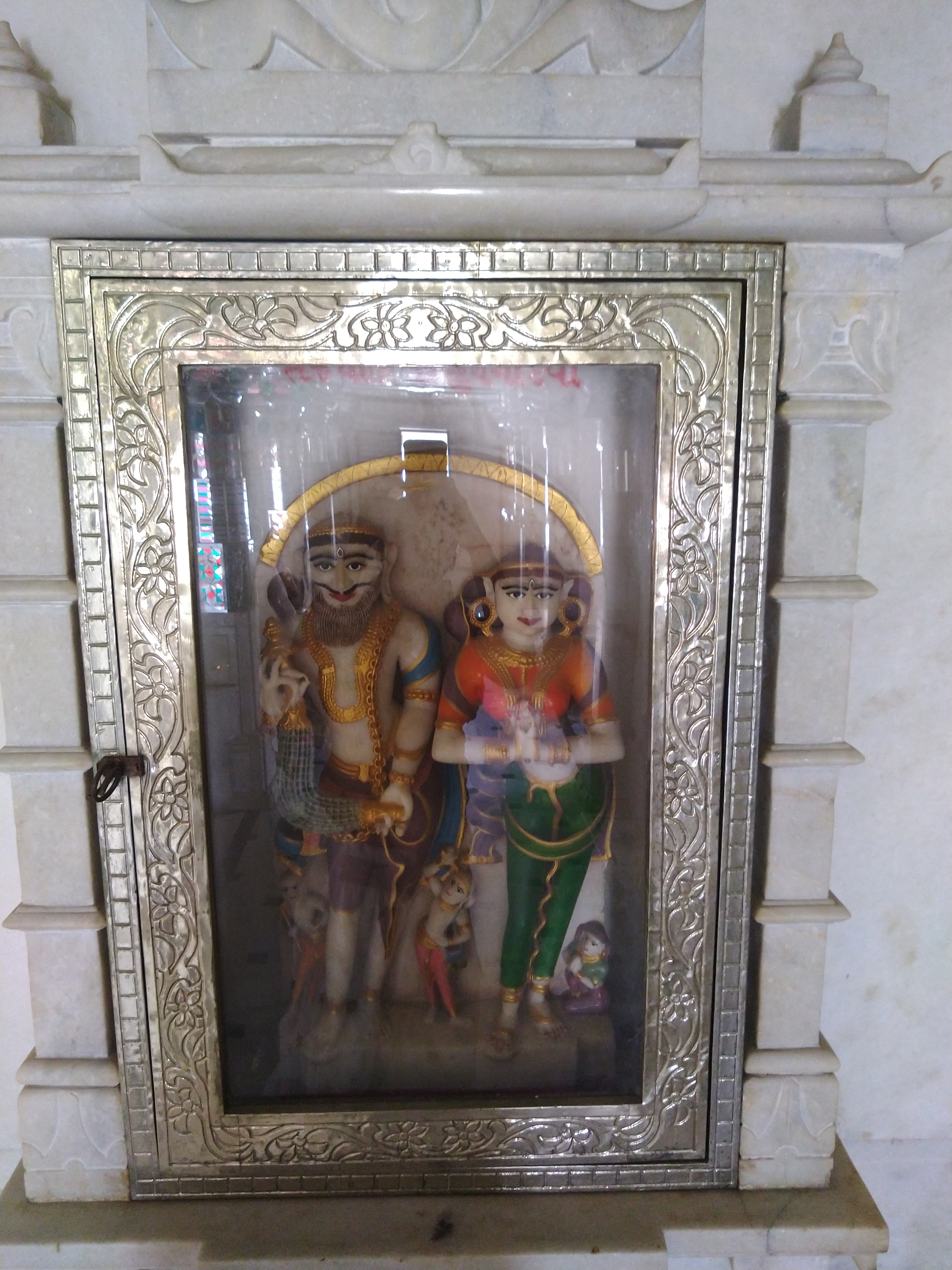
Idols of Tejapala and Anupamadevi in a niche at Manoranjan Parshwanath Jain Temple (Mota Derasar) at Mehsana, Gujarat, India

Very little is known about the early life of Vastupala or his brother. Even less is known about Vastupala's date of birth, although the Vasantavilāsa mentions 1163 CE as the year of birth. An undated inscription (now housed in the Watson Museum, Rajkot) mentions that the brothers made a pilgrimage to Mount Shatrunjaya with their father Aśvarājā in VS 1249 (1193 CE), presumably during their childhood. They lived in Sumhalaka, a town granted to their father as a reward for his service to the king of Chaulukya. Their father visited many pilgrim sites with their mother Kumāradevī and built several public utilities, such as lakes, tanks, wells, and temples. After the death of their father, they lived in Mandali or Mandalika (modern day Mandal) with their mother, probably until her death.

Vastupala was married to Lalita and Vayajalladevi (or Sokhuka or Saukhyalata). Tejapala was married to Anupama and Suhavadevi (also spelled Suhadadevi). Anupama was a daughter of Dharaniga, a counselor to the brothers, and his wife Tribhuvanadevi.

== Career ==
According to Kirti-kaumudi, the Vasanta-vilasa, the Prabandha-kosha, and the Prabandha-chintamani, the brothers travelled to the Vaghela capital at Dhavalakka (modern day Dholka). There, they were introduced by Someshvara to king Viradhavala who subsequently appointed them. Other sources, such as the Sukrita-sankirtana, Vastupala-Tejapala-Prashasti and Sukrita-kirti-kallolini, state that the brothers served the Chaulukya king Bhima II who dispatched them to Viradhavala. This is confirmed by writings by Vastupala himself, who wrote in the Naranarayanananda that he was in the service of Bhima II prior to his departure for Dhavalakka. The date when he began his service in the Chaulukya court is not known but they were certainly appointed at Dhavalakka in VS 1276 (1220 CE). Vastupala and Tejapala traveled to Dhavalakka at a time when they were in such poverty that their other brother, Luniga, was unable to donate an image of Jina to the Vimala-vasahi temple on Mount Abu before his death. Vastupala and Tejapala are said to have miraculously acquired wealth through the blessings of Shrimata, the patron deity of Abu and using this wealth, they commissioned a temple, Luniga-vasahi, dedicated to Luniga.

=== Administrative career ===
Vastupala was made a governor of Sthambhatirtha (now Khambhat), then an important port town, while Tejapala was made a minister at Dhavalakka. During his tenure, he enacted reforms to the administration and increased state revenue. He also instituted measures against corruption and piracy. The Vastupala-charita mentions punishments being meted out to a wealthy Muslim trader from Stambhatirtha, various corrupt officials, citizens, and village headmen. Particular examples include the fining of the village heads of around five hundred villages in the region for irregularities, as well as the administrators of Vardhamanapur (modern day Wadhwan) and Gohilavati.

=== Military career ===
The Prabandhas mention that Vastupala participated in 63 battles, although few of these are discussed. They mention his involvement in the military activities of Viradhavala, and state that he captured Vamanasthali (modern day Vanthali) from Samgana and Chamunda, brothers of Viradhavala's wife Jayataladevi.

The brothers also attacked Bhadreshwar, ruled by Bhimasimha of the Pratihara clan, in Kutch but were unsuccessful and ultimately concluded a peace treaty with him. Vastupala and Viradhavala were defeated by the three warriors from Marwar; Samantapala, Anandapala and Trilokasimha; who had supported Bhimasimha. Tejapala commanded an army against Ghughula, a chief of Godraha (modern day Godhra), and successfully captured him. Tejapala had him imprisoned within a wooden cage until he committed suicide by biting his tongue.

Sadik, (Note: Sadik is also mentioned as Said, Saiyad or Syed) a Muslim merchant, rejected the authority of Vastupala and induced Sankha (Sangramsimha), a ruler of Lata (now South Gujarat) to attack Stambhatirtha. Vastupala suffered a number of early defeats but he later received support from Mahechaka (although the Prabandha-chintamani states that it was Lunapala). After a fierce battle at Vatakupa near Stambhatirtha, Shankha retreated or was killed. Sadik was captured and put to death. Viradhavala ordered the confiscation his property, absorbing it into the state treasury. Vastupala received some part of his wealth.

The people of Stambhatirtha celebrated the victory by organising a festival in the temple of Goddess Ekallavira which lay outside the town. Vastupala attended the festival, and paid the homage to the goddess. The battle must have fought before he handed over administration of Stambhatirtha to his son, Jaitrasimha or Jayantastmha, in VS 1279 (1223 CE). Harihara's Sankha-Parabhava-Vyayoga is a historical play dramatizing this battle.

During the reign of Viradhavala, the Sultan of Delhi Mojdin (Note: Based on chronology, the Sultan is identified as Iltutmish (r. 1211 CE – 1236 CE).) attacked Gurjaradesa, an event that was dramatised in Hammira-mada-mardana, a Sanskrit play by Jaysimha Suri. The Prabandhka-kosha describes the Delhi army being forced to retreat after being encircled by Dharavarsha of Chandravati from the north, and Vastupala from the south, leaving the army trapped in a mountain pass near Arbuda (modern day Mount Abu).

In another action against the Delhi Sultanate, Vastupala secretly hired pirates to rob the mother of the Sultan when she was to board a ship, possibly at Stambhatirtha, taking her on a pilgrimage to Mecca. The captain of the ship approached Vastupala who received the Sultan's mother with respect and returned the booty. Upon her return from Mecca, she presented Vastupala to the Sultan, who began friendly relations with Viradhavala. Vastupala was received with honour by Viradhavala for successfully safeguarding his realm from the predations of the Delhi Sultanate. Copied manuscripts of Hammira-mada-mardana are dated to around 1230 CE (VS 1286) and Vastupala had begun his career in 1220 CE (VS 1276) so this event is likely to have occurred between these two dates. These manuscripts are preserved in Jain library of Jaisalmer.

== Death ==
Vastupala died in 1240 CE (VS 1296), not long after Viradhavala, who died in 1238 CE and was succeeded by his younger brother Visaladeva. The date of Vastupala's death is mentioned by his contemporary, Balachandra, who wrote in Vasanta-vilasa that his death fell on the fifth day of the bright half of Magha month VS 1296, corresponding to 1 January 1240 CE. The year VS 1296 is also mentioned in a palm leaf manuscript. However, Prabandha-kosha and Vastupala-charita both note VS 1298 (1242 CE) as the year of his death. The Abu inscription, dated to the third day of the bright of Vaishakha month VS 1296 (12 April 1240 CE), mentions Tejapala as a Mahamatya (minister), a position he could only have ascended to following the death of Vastupala, so 1240 CE is considered as a true date of his death.

The Prabandhas mention that he died due to fever in a village Arkapalita (now Ankevalia in Gujarat), on his last pilgrimage to Mount Shatrunjaya, but this is not mentioned in Vasanta-vilasa.

The Vividha-tirtha-kalpa and Prabandha-kosha mention that Vastupala lost his ministerial authority to Nagara Brahmin Nagada. Two different stories are mentioned: One stating that Visaladeva was angered because Vastupala had declared the punishment to his maternal uncle for insulting a Jain monk. Another states that Visaladeva decided to punish Vastupala when he found that some of state revenues were used for the temple constructions. In both the stories, Someshvara saved Vastupala from punishment. This is counter to other sources that mention Visaladeva being dissatisfied with Vastupala but did not make any mention of a loss of ministerial authority. The Abu inscription, dated to the 3rd day of the bright half of the Magha month VS 1296 (26 April 1240 CE), suggests that Tejapala succeeded him as minister so the king must not have removed him as a minister. Tejapala's son Lunasimha is mentioned as a governor of Bhrigukachcha (modern day Bharuch) in a colophon of a palm-leaf manuscript dated VS 1296 (1242 CE). Tejapala is mentioned as a minister (mahamatya) in a manuscript of Ācārāṅga Sūtra dated to VS 1303 (1247 CE). The Vastupala-charita mentions that Tejapala died ten years after the death of Vastupala, so he may have died in VS 1306 (1250 CE), VS 1308 (1252 CE) or VS 1304 (1248 CE). Nagada is first mentioned as a minister in VS 1310 (1254 CE) so Tejapala must have died between 1247 CE and 1254 CE.

== Cultural activities ==
=== Pilgrimages ===
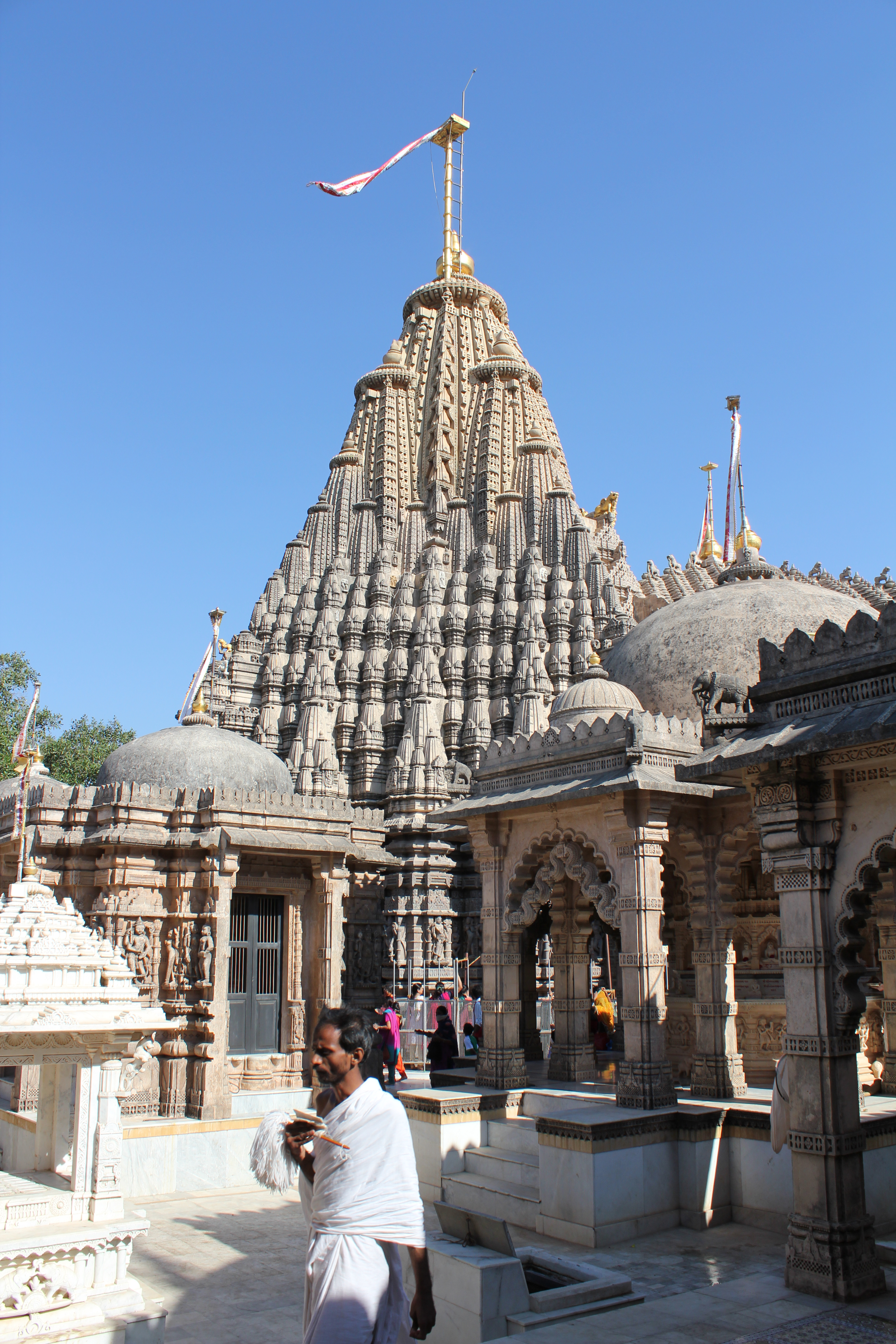
Adinatha Temple on Mount Shatrunjaya

Vastupala made thirteen pilgrimages to Mount Shatrunjaya and Girnar. In addition to his childhood visits with his father in 1193 CE and 1194 CE, he led five annual sanghas (pilgrim caravans) to Shatrunjaya and Girnar between 1221 and 1237 CE as well as annual pilgrimages with his family to Shatrunjaya between 1227 and 1233 CE. His pilgrimage in 1221 CE is mentioned repeatedly in Girnar inscriptions and in contemporary works such as the Kirti-kaumudi, Sukrita-sankirtana and Dharmabhyudaya. He died during his 1240 CE pilgrimage, which is described in Vasanta-vilasa.

=== Construction activities ===
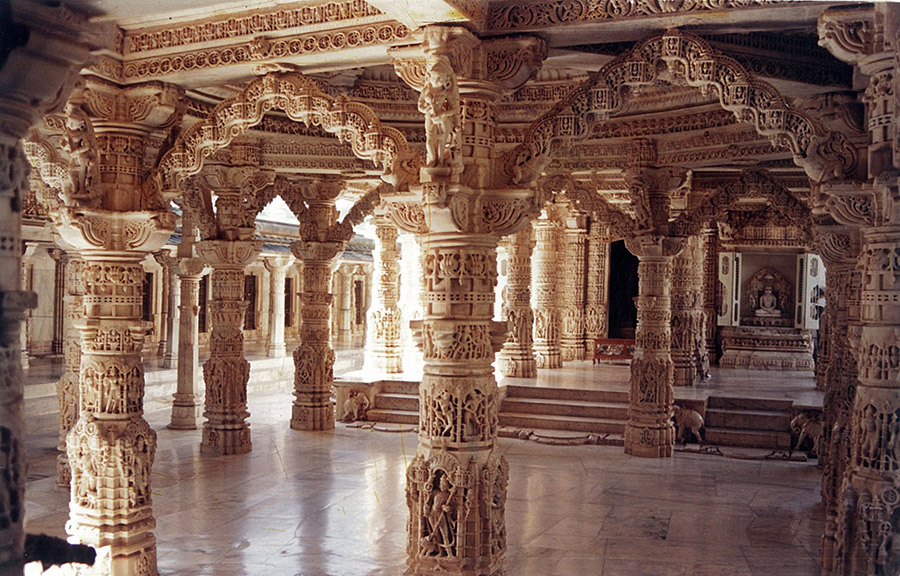
Interior of the Luniga-vasahi temple on Mount Abu

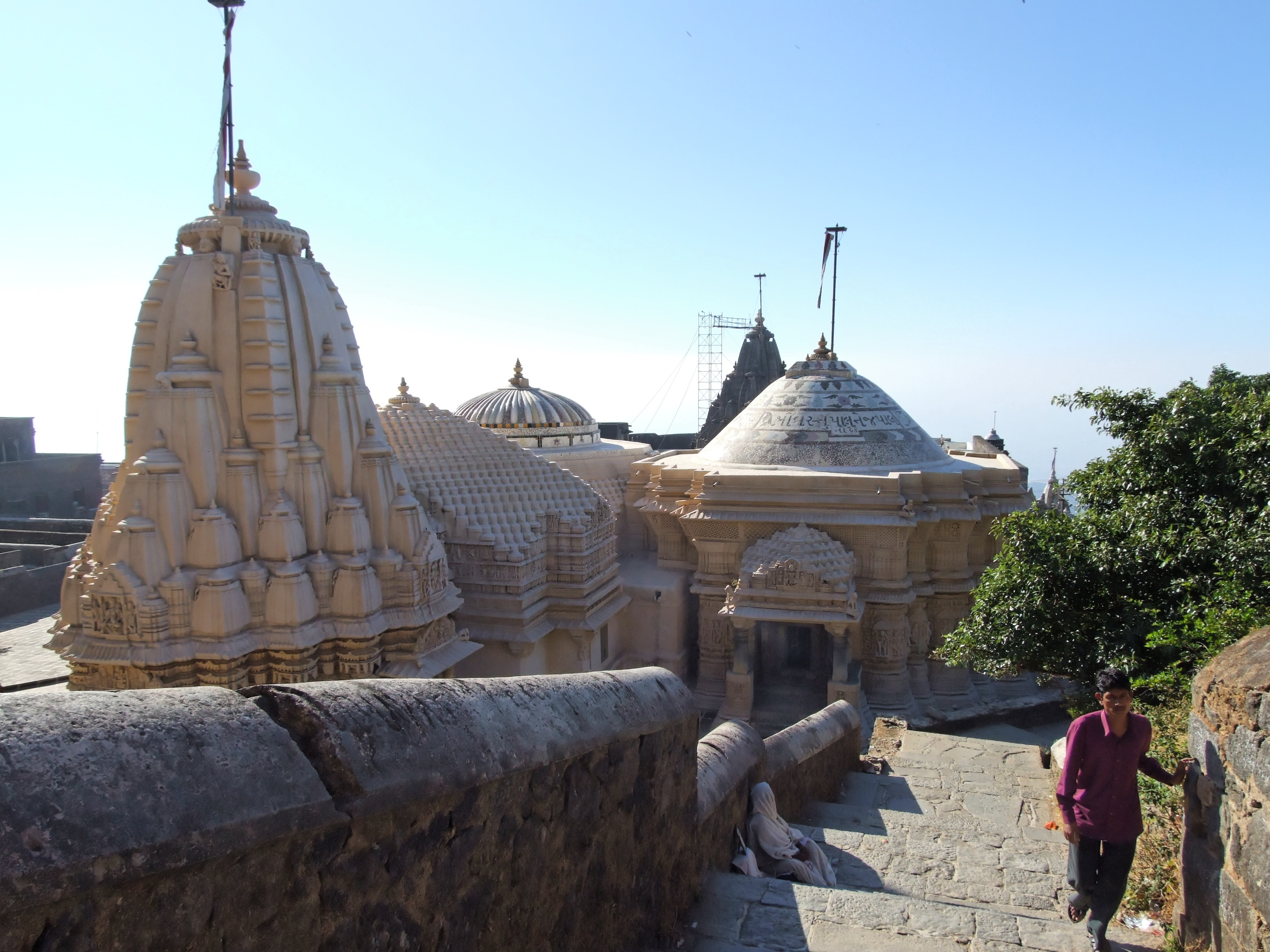
Vastupala-Vihara on Girnar hill

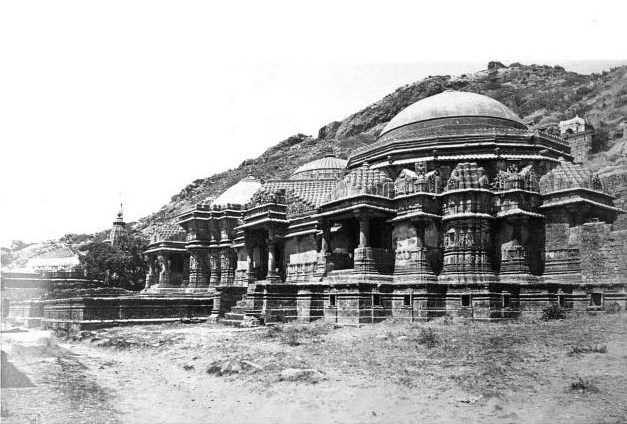
Vastupala-Vihara in 1876

Vastupala was a philanthropist and commissioned the construction of numerous monuments and public utilities such as temples, rest-houses, wells, hospitals and tanks. Contemporary sources, such as Sukrita-sankirtana, mention about fifty construction works. The number of his works increased considerably in later works of Rajashekhara Suri, Jinaharsha and Jinaprabha, although the number maybe exaggerated. Rajashekhara Suri mentioned that his charity extended from Shri Shaila in the south to Kedara in the north and Prabhasa in the west to Banaras in the east. Apart from building numerous Jain temples, he also built Brahmashalas, Mathas, Shiva temples as well as mosques.

More than fifty temples were commissioned by Vastupala and Tejapala in addition to a large number of renovations and image installations. Vastupala commissioned the construction of Indra-mandapa and six other temples on Shatrunjaya hill, the Adinatha temple at Dholka, Ashtapada-prasada at Prabhas, Vastupala-vihara and Parshwanatha temple on Girnar. The Girnar temples were built in 1232 CE. His brother, Tejapala, commissioned the construction of Asharaja-vihara at Tejalapur, Patan and Junagadh in memory of his father. He also commissioned the Neminath Temple at Dholka, Adinath Temple at Prabhas, as well as temples at Tharad, Karnavati, Godhra, Shatrunjaya, Girnar, Pavagadh, Navsari among others. In memory of his mother Kumaradevi, he had temples built at Khambhat and Dabhoi. Vastupala built a temple dedicated to Mahavira, an Upashraya (prayer house for monks) and excavated a tank at Padaliptapura (modern day Palitana). He also built large tanks at Arakapalita and Suryapura, two statues at the temple dedicated to Mahavira at Modhera, and Shakunika-vihara at Bharuch.

The Luniga-vasahi temple dedicated to Neminatha was built on Mount Abu by Tejapala in memory of his elder brother Luniga in 1231 CE. (Note: The inscription states that it was built for spiritual progress of Tejapala's wife Anupama and his son Lunasimha.) There are about thirty inscriptions mentioning additions to the temples and his family members. The Prabandhas state that the Luniga-vasahi cost twelve crores and fifty-three lakhs while the Girnar temples cost eighteen crores and ninety-six lakhs, although these figures may be an exaggerated. Of the temples built by the brothers, only a few survive such as Vastupala-vihara at Girnar (1231 CE), Neminath Temple at Abu and the temple at Prabhas.

Born into an aristocratic family, the brothers were quite wealthy and were patrons of many public works. The Prabandhas contain numerous stories of their wealth, some of which read like folktales while others are contemporaneous accounts. One account tells of the brothers seeking to bury part of their wealth, worth one lakh, near the village of Hadalaka (modern Hadala near Dhandhuka). However, upon excavation, they discovered a large treasure. Anupama, wife of Tejapala, counselled Vastupala to keep it on the peaks of the mountains so it may not fall in the hands of others, as it fell to theirs. The brothers had the Jain temples of Girnar and Mount Abu built and led pilgrimages there. Her advice proved sound and these are the only surviving public works built by the brothers. (Note: Three pillars with inscriptions are recovered from Patan. Two of them are now reused in Kalika Mata Temple while one is in private museum.)

=== Patronage ===
Vastupala was a patron to many poets and scholars, earning him nickname Laghu Bhojaraja or Junior Bhoja. His patronage of poetry is described in the Prabandha-kosha, Vastupala-charita, Puratana-prabandha-samgraha and Upadesha-tarangini. He was a tolerant of other faiths which led him to be patron to Jain as well as non-Jain poets and scholars as well, including Someshvara, Harihara, Arisimha and Nanaka. He also made a donation of 10000 drammas (coins) to the Shiva temple of Prabhas.

Many literary works were commissioned at his request such as the Katha-ratnakara of Narachandra Suri and the Alankara-mahodadhi of Narendraprabha Suri. He had made a copy of Dharmabhyudaya Mahakavya of Udayaprabha Suri, a pupil of Vijayasena Suri. This copied manuscript, dated VS 1290 (1234 CE), has been stored in the Jain library of Khambhat.

=== Literary works ===
He was an expert poet having studied Nyaya, Vyakarana (grammar) and Sahitya (literature), as well as Jain philosophy under Narachandra, and was eulogised in the works of others. He had received titles of 'Kavi-kunjara', 'Saraswati-kantha-bharana' (Ornament of the goddess of knowledge Saraswati's neck), 'Kavi-chakravarti' (universal king of poetry) and 'Kurchala-saraswati' (Saraswati with a beard) for his literary capabilities.

Harihara, Someshvara and other poets gave him a poetic name, Vasantapala, and Balachandra named his biographical work, Vasanta-vilasa. Vastuapala wrote Naranarayanananda and noted in its conclusion that his first poem was a hymn praising Adinatha in the temple on the Shatrunjaya hills. This hymn is Adinatha Stotra, or Ishwara-manoratha-maya Stotra, and consists of twelve verses. Another of his Stotra, Nemistava, contains ten verses, eight dedicated to Neminatha and two to himself. Ambika Stotra is dedicated to Ambika, the presiding goddess of Neminatha and the family goddess of Pragavata, his clan. It has ten verses, eight of which praise Ambika, the ninth contains blessings for the devotee and the tenth is reserved for himself. He wrote a short ten verse devotional, Aradhana, which would be his last composition. Prabandha-kosha notes that the first verse of it, "Na Kritam Sukritam Kinchit", was spoken by him on his death-bed. Aradhana is also mentioned in the Puratana-prabandha-samgraha and the Prabandha-chintamani.

Vastupala was considered an expert in composing Sanskrit suktis (stray poetry), drawing praise from Someshvara and Udayaprabha. A number of his works appear in anthologies written by others. Sukti-muktavali, a 13th-century anthology commissioned by the Yadava general Jalhana, contains four of his verses as does the Sharngadhara-paddhati written by Sharangdhara of Shakambhari.

His Naranarayanananda is a long poem describing the friendship between Krishna and Arjuna, their walk and talks in the gardens of Raivataka (Girnar), and the later abduction of Krishna's sister Subhadra by Arjuna. The subject is taken from Vanaparva of Mahabharata. It consists of 16 cantos with 794 verses. He mentioned his pilgrimages at the end of the poem so it must have been written after 1221 CE, the year of his first major pilgrimage. Parts of the poem were quoted by others, such as Kavya-kalpalata of Amarachandra, who drew one verse, and Jalhana who included the sixth verse from the first canto in his Sukti-muktavali.

== Sources of information ==
A large number of literary sources and inscriptions give information on the life and works of Vastupala and his brother Tejapala.

=== Literary sources ===
==== Contemporary literary sources ====
The last canto of Naranarayanananda, written by Vastupala himself, gives some information on him and his family. Other biographical works, such as Kirti-kaumudi and Surathotsava, both written by Someshvara, and Sukrita-sankirtana, by Arisimha, were written during Vastupula's lifetime while Balachandra's Vasanta-vilasa was written soon after his death. Surathotsava is a mythological historical allegory but it does give information on the Chaulukya king Bhima II, whom Vastupala first served; Dharmabhyudaya mentions his pilgrimages; and Jayasimha's play Hammira-mada-mardana (1220–1230 CE) discusses his military career and his strategy in dealing with the invasion from Delhi. The Apabhramsa poems – Revanatagiri Rasu by Vijayasena and Abu Rasa (1233 CE) by Pahlanputra – mention his pilgrimage to Girnar and the construction of the temple on Mount Abu respectively. Jinabhadra's Prabandhavali, the oldest prabandha, speaks of events during Vastupala's life and has helped solve chronological inconsistencies. Narendraprabha's Vastupala-prashasti, Narachandra's Vastupala-prashasti, and Udayaprabha's Vastupala-stuti mention his activities.

==== Later literary sources ====
Merutunga's Prabandha-Chintamani (1305 CE); Rajashekhara's Prabandha-kosha (1349 CE); and Puratana-prabandha-sangraha, a collection of prabandhas from 13th to 15th century; are important sources. Jinaprabha's Vividha-tirtha-kalpa (1333 CE) is also noteworthy. Jinaharsha's Vastupala-charita is an authentic biography of Vastupala with very few exaggerations. Ratnamandiragani's Upadesha-tarangini (1461 CE), Subhashilagani's Prabandha-panchasati / Kathakosha (1453 CE), and Somadharma's Upadesha-saptati (1447 CE) note the cultural activities of Vastupala. Old Gujarati poems include Vastupla-Tejapala-Rasa and other Rasas by Hiranada (1428 CE), Lakshmisagara (after 1452 CE), Parshwachandra (1541 CE), Samayasundara (1626 CE), and Meruvijaya (1665 CE).

=== Epigraphic sources ===
Find spots of the inscriptions related to Vastupala and Tejapala.

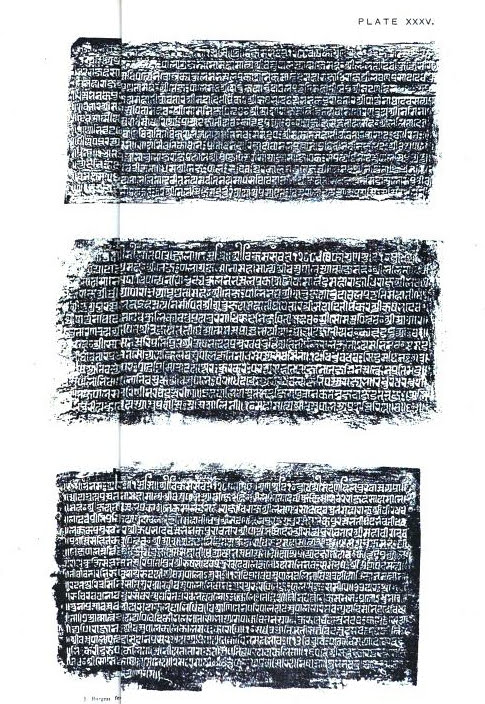
Inscriptions of the Vastupala-Vihara on Mount Girnar

A large number of inscriptions of Vastupala and Tejapala, some short while others are very long, are available. Most of these inscriptions are in the Girnar range (VS (Note: The luni-solar Vikram Samvat calendar is 56.7 years ahead of the solar Gregorian calendar. For example, the year VS 2074 began in 2017 CE and ended in 2018 CE.) 1288, VS 1289, VS 1293) and Abu (VS 1278, VS 1287, VS 1288, VS 1290, VS 1293, VS 1296) while a few are at the Taranga hills (VS 1285), Vaidyanatha-prashsti of Dabhoi (1255 CE) by Someshvara, Patan, Sherisa (VS 1285, near Ahmedabad), Khambhat (VS 1281), Nagara (VS 1292, near Khambhat), Ganesar (VS 1291, near Dholka), Dhammani (1296, Sirohi) and Nava Sanghpur (near Vijapur). The majority of such inscriptions are found in temples. Jinaprabha's Sukrita-kirti-kallolini (1231 CE) and Jayasimha's Vastupala-Tejapala-Prashsti are known from the manuscripts but these inscriptions have not survived. All these inscriptions are contemporary or near-contemporary.

== Notes and references ==
=== Bibliography ===
- Dhaky, M. A. (2010). "વસ્તુપાલ-તેજપાલની કીર્તનાત્મક પ્રવૃત્તિઓ" [Building Activities of Vastupala-Tejapala]. In Shah, Jitendra B. (ed.). સાહિત્ય, શિલ્પ અને સ્થાપત્યમાં ગિરનાર [Girnar in Literature, Sculptures and Architecture]. L. D. Series: 148 (Sambodhi-Puratatva-Visheshank-2) (in Gujarati). Ahmedabad: Lalbhai Dalpatbhai Institute of Indology. pp. 98–116. ISBN 978-81-85857-30-5.
- Laughlin, Jack C. (1 November 2011). "Portraiture and Jain Sacred Place: The Patronage of Ministers Vastupala and Tejahpala". In Granoff, Phyllis; Shinohara, Koichi (eds.). Pilgrims, Patrons, and Place: Localizing Sanctity in Asian Religions. UBC Press. pp. 297–331. ISBN 978-0-7748-4219-8.
- Sandesara, Bhogilal J. (1953). Literary Circle Of Mahāmātya Vastupāla And Its Contribution To Sanskrit Literature. Shri Bahadur Singh Sindhi Memoir. Vol. 3. Bombay: Sindhi Jain Shastra Sikshapith, Bharatiya Vidya Bhavan. pp. 23–139.
