= Udayaprabha Suri =

12th century Indian Jain ascetic

- Title: Acharya

Personal life
- Era: Vaghela period
- Notable work(s): Dharmabhyudaya, Sukrita Kirti Kallolini
- Other names: Udaya-prabha-deva-suri
- Occupation: Jain monk, Sanskrit writer

Religious life
- Religion: Jainism

Udaya-prabha Sūri (fl. 1221–43) was a Śvetāmbara Jain monk and writer from the Vaghela kingdom of present-day India. He was a member of the literary circle of the minister Vastupala, and wrote several Sanskrit-language works.

== Biography ==
Udaya-prabha was a member of the Nagendra-gaccha, and a pupil of Vijaya-sena (died 1245). His lineage of teachers is as follows: Vijaya-sena, Hari-bhadra, Ananda and Amara-chandra (contemporaries of Jayasimha Siddharaja), Shanti-suri, and Mahendra-prabhu.

He was a member of the literary circle of Vastupala, a minister in the Vaghela kingdom of present-day Gujarat and southern Rajasthan. Vastupala invited distant scholars to teach Udaya-prabha various shastras, which suggests that Udaya-prabha was younger than Vastupala. The minister also organized an expensive function to appoint Udaya-prabha as an acharya.

Jina-bhadra, a disciple of Udaya-prabha, wrote or compiled several prabandha stories that are part of the Prabandhavali and Puratana Prabandha Sangraha. Mallisena, another disciple of Udaya-prabha Syadvada-manjari, a work on Jain philosophy in 1292 CE.

== Works ==
Udayaprabha wrote several poems, prashastis, and commentaries, dated between 1221 and 1243. His works include:

- Sukrita Kirti Kallolini (IAST: Sukṛta-kīrti-kallolinī, "River of the Glory of Good Deeds"), a panegyric glorifying the deeds of Vastupala and Tejapala. It was composed in 1221 on the occasion of Vastupala's Samgha-yatra pilgrimage, and inscribed on a slab at Shatrunjaya.
- Vastupala-stuti ("Praise of Vastupala"), another panegyric glorifying Vastupala.
- Dharmabhyudaya (or Purana Sangha-pati-charita), a work on Vijaya-sena's teaching of Jainism, written for Vastupala. It includes a number of Jain legends and an account of the history of Shatrunjaya. The work is undated, but it was definitely composed before 1234, the year of a manuscript copied by Vastupala himself. It was probably composed in 1221 on the occasion of Vastupala's pilgrimage.
- Arambha-siddhi or Pancha-vimarsha, a work on astrology in 412 verses and 5 chapters. This text is known from over 70 manuscripts. There are several commentaries on this text, including some anonymous works, an avachurni by Samaya-ratna Gani, and a varttika by Hema-hamsa Gani (fl. 1458).
- Upadesha-mala-karnika (IAST: Upadeśa-māla-karṇikā), a commentary on Dharmadasa Gani's Upadesha-mala. The author composed in 1243 at Dhavalakka (modern Dholka), at the suggestion of his teacher Vijaya-sena.
- A partially lost work, probably titled Shabda-brahmollasa, known from 47 surviving verses preserved on the fragments of a palm-leaf manuscript. The subject matter of the work is not clear from the surviving portion, although the title suggests that it was a treatise on the philosophy of grammar.
- Verses in a Girnar prashasti inscription of Vastupala.
- A 1225 CE 19-verse prashasti of a religious cottage (pausadha-shala) built by Vastupala at Stambha-tirtha.

Udayaprabha-Suri should not be confused with the 12th-century monk Udayaprabha, who was a pupil of Ravi-prabha-suri, and who wrote commentaries on Nemichandra's Pravachana-saroddhara and three Karma-granthas.
