= Bhadrabahu II =

- Died: 12 BC

Religious life
- Religion: Jainism
- Sect: Digambara

Bhadrabahu was a Digambara monk from ancient India. He is called Bhadrabahu II or Bhadrabahu the Junior to distinguish him from the earlier Bhadrabahu.

== Biography ==
According to the Digambara tradition, Bhadrabahu died in 12 BCE.

=== Association with Varahamihira ===
Unlike the Digambara tradition which suggests the existence of multiple distinct men named Bhadrabahu, the Śvetāmbara tradition mentions only one Bhadrabahu. Two 14th-century texts by Śvetāmbara authors - Merutunga's Prabandha Chintamani and Rajashekhara-suri's Prabandha Kosha (Chaturvimsati prabandha) - describe the 6th-century astrologer Varahamihira as a brother and rival of Bhadrabahu. Merutunga places the two brothers in Pataliputra, while Rajashekhara places them in Pratishthana. The story also appears in some later works with some minor changes; these texts include Rasimanadala-prakarana-vritti and Kalpa-sutra-subhodika-vritti.

Although these Śvetāmbara legends identify Varahamihira's alleged brother with the 4th-century BCE Bhadrabahu, it is likely that their authors confused him with either Bhadrabahu II or Bhadrabahu III of the Digambara texts.

According to one theory, Bhadrabahu II of the Digambara tradition is same as the alleged brother of Varahamihira mentioned in the Śvetāmbara tradition, because both traditions describe him as a pupil of Yashobhadra and knowledgeable about astrology. However, it is equally likely that Bhadrabahu III of the Digambara tradition is same as the alleged brother of Varahamihira mentioned in the Śvetāmbara tradition, since Varahamihira lived in the 6th-century BCE, not first century BCE.
