= Bhadrabahu III =

- Notable work: Niryuktis

Religious life
- Religion: Jainism

Bhadrabahu III was a Jain monk, whom some scholars such as Muni Puṇya-vijaya credit with writing Niryuktis (commentaries) on the redacted Agama-sutras.

== Association with Varahamihira ==
Unlike the Digambara tradition which suggests the existence of multiple distinct men named Bhadrabahu, the Śvetāmbara tradition mentions only one Bhadrabahu. Two 14th-century texts by Śvetāmbara authors - Merutunga's Prabandha Chintamani and Rajashekhara-suri's Prabandha Kosha (Chaturvimsati prabandha) - describe the 6th-century astrologer Varahamihira as a brother and rival of Bhadrabahu. Merutunga places the two brothers in Pataliputra, while Rajashekhara places them in Pratishthana. The story also appears in some later works with some minor changes. All these legends are historically inaccurate. The texts by Merutunga and Rajashekhara feature several other anachronisms, such as describing the 7th-century poets Bana and Magha as contemporaries of the 11th-century king Bhoja.

Although these Śvetāmbara legends identify Varahamihira's alleged brother with the 4th-century BCE Bhadrabahu, it is likely that their authors confused him with either Bhadrabahu II or Bhadrabahu III of the Digambara texts.

According to one theory, Bhadrabahu II is same as the alleged brother of Varahamihira, because both traditions describe him as a pupil of Yashobhadra and knowledegable about astrology. However, it is equally likely that Bhadrabahu III is same as the alleged brother of Varahamihira, since Varahamihira lived in the 6th-century BCE, not first century BCE. Bhadrabahu III is credited with writing niryuktis (commentaries) on the redacted Agama-sutras; the Jain tradition places the redaction of the Śvetāmbara canon in 5th century CE, so Bhadrabahu III can be considered as a contemporary of Varahamihira.

== Works ==
Muni Punya-vijaya theorizes that Bhadrabahu III, who lived in the 6th century, composed the Prakrit-language niryuktis and the Upasarga-hara-stotra.

Punya-vijaya also theorizes that Bhadrabahu III authored the Sanskrit-language astrological treatise Bhadrabāhu-samhita. The authorship of the Bhadrabāhu-saṃhitā (Note: Rajashekhara calls the work Bhadrabahvi-samhita; the manuscripts variously call it Bhadrabāhu-samhita, Bhadrabahu-kanimitta, Bhadrabahu-nimitta-shastra, Bhadrabahu-virachita-nimitta-shastra, and Bhadrabahu-virachita-Maha-n[a]imitta-shastra.) is attributed to Varahamihira's alleged brother Bhadrabahu in Rajashekhara's Prabandha-kosha. In the text, Bhadrabahu educates his pupils on astrology, at the Pandugiri hill near Rajagrha in Magadha, during the reign of the king Senajit. According to historian Ajay Mitra Shastri, the text could not have been the work of a 6th-century author: it is likely a 14th-century forgery. Shastri notes that Rajashekhara describes Bhadrabahu as superior to Varahamihira, but Bhadrabāhu-samhita is inferior to Varahamihira's Bṛhat-saṃhitā in every aspect, including content, presentation, organization, and language. Moreover, the text features several non-Jain elements: it begins in a Puranic fashion, describes Bhadrabahu as a bhagavat, mentions several Brahmanical deities before the Arhats, refers to the varna system, and recommends the performance of Vedic sacrifices. Shastri therefore describes it as "an unintelligent compilation" based on some earlier Brahmanical work which was modified to make it look like a Jain text.
