= Hazari Prasad Dwivedi =

Hindi novelist and scholar (1907–1979)

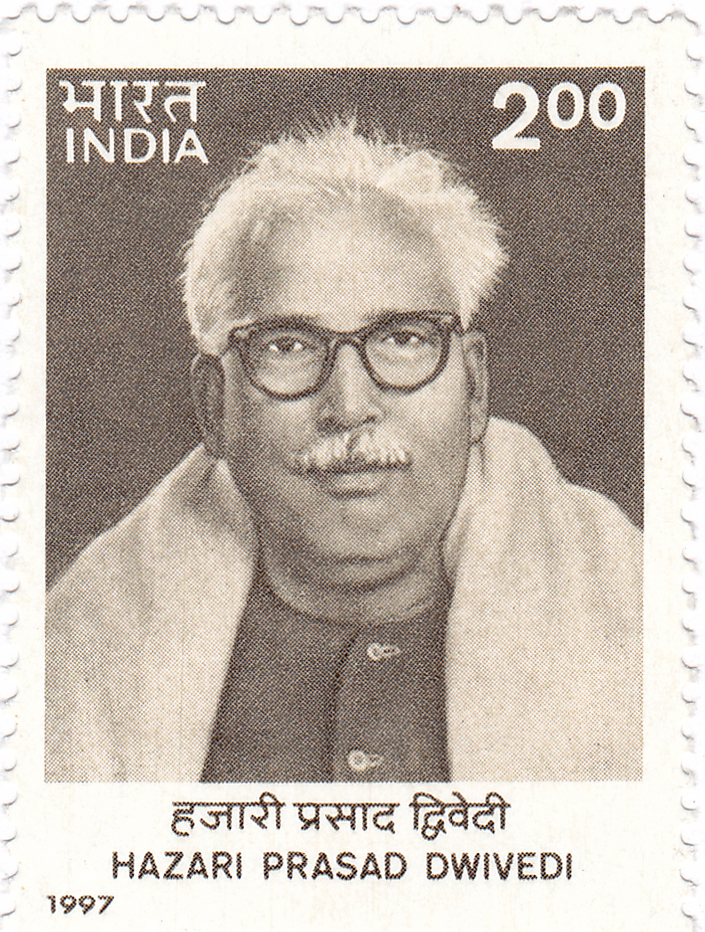
- Hazari Prasad Dwivedi on a 1997 Indian stamp
- Born: 19 August 1907; Ballia, United Provinces of Agra and Oudh, British India
- Died: 19 May 1979 (aged 71); Delhi, India
- Occupations: Writer, essayist, scholar, historian, novelist, critic
- Writing career
- Notable works: Kabir, Banbhatt Ki Aatmkatha, Sahitya Ki Bhumika, Nakhoon Kyon Barhte Hain, Kutaj, Alok Parva
- Notable awards: 1973: Sahitya Akademi Award; 1957: Padma Bhushan

Hazari Prasad Dwivedi (Devanagari: हज़ारीप्रसाद द्विवेदी) (19 August 1907 – 19 May 1979) was a Hindi novelist, literary historian, essayist, critic and scholar. He penned numerous novels, collections of essays, historical research on medieval religious movements of India especially Kabir and Natha Sampradaya, and historical outlines of Hindi literature.

Besides Hindi, he was master of many languages including Sanskrit, Bengali, Punjabi, Gujarati as well as Pali, Prakrit, and Apabhramsa.

He had a great knowledge of Sanskrit, Pali and Prakrit. As a student of Sanskrit, steeped in the Sastras, he gave a new evaluation to Sahitya-sastra and he is considered as a great commentator on the textual tradition of the Indian literature.

He was awarded the Padma Bhushan in 1957 for his contribution to Hindi literature, and the 1973 Sahitya Akademi Award for his collection of essays, 'Alok Parva'.

== Early life ==
He was born on 19 August 1907 at Dubey Chapra village in Ballia district of Uttar Pradesh in a traditional family famous for astrologers. His father Pandit Anamol Dwivedi was a learned Sanskrit scholar.

Dwivedi had his early education until middle examination at his village school. After completing his intermediate, he also studied Jyotisha (astrology) and Sanskrit at a traditional school to qualify for 'Acharya' degree in astrology and 'Shastri' degree in Sanskrit. He received a Doctorate in Hindi literature from University of Lucknow in 1949.

== Career ==
Dwivedi joined Visva Bharati in 1930. He taught Sanskrit and Hindi and was engaged in research and creative writing. He stayed on in Santiniketan for two decades. He helped to found the Hindi Bhavana and was its head for many years.

During his stay at Shantiniketan, he came in close contact with Rabindranath Tagore and other prominent figures of Bengali literature. He came to imbibe the subtleties of Bengali, the aesthetic sensibilities of Nandalal Bose, the search for roots of Kshitimohan Sen and the gentle but piercing humour of Gurudayal Mallik. These influences are evident in his later writings.

He left Shantiniketan in 1950 and became Reader in the Hindi Department at the Banaras Hindu University, Varanasi, where Dr. Jagannath Prasad Sharma was the professor and head of the department. Dwivedi Ji served there till 1960. While in this position, he was also appointed a Member of the first Official Language Commission set up in 1955 by Indian Government.

In 1960 he joined Panjab University, Chandigarh, as Professor and Head of its Hindi Department, a post that he held till his retirement.

== Works ==
Dwivedi made significant contributions to Indian creative and critical literature, and his scholarly interests were wide-ranging.

He wrote the following important works in literary history and criticism:

- Sahitya ki Bhumika
- Hindi Sahitya ka Adikala

The above writings of his gave a new direction to the history of criticism in the Hindi literature.

He also published his historical analysis of medieval religious life of India in following books:

- Kabir
- Madhyakalin Dharma Sadhana
- Natha Sampradaya

He was also an eminent novelist. His novels revolved around Historical themes and personages. His following Historical Novels are considered classics:

- Banbhatt Ki Aatmkatha (1946)
- Anamdas Ka Potha
- Punarnava
- Charu-chandra-Lekha

He was also a great essayist. Some of his memorable essays are:

- Kalplata (Shirish ke phool and other essays): Shirish ke phool is part of NCERT Hindi book for class XII
- Nakhoon Kyon Barhte Hain (Why do the nails grow)
- Ashok ke phool
- Kutaj
- Alok Parva (Collection)

He also translated many works from English and other languages to Hindi. These include:

- Prabandha-Chintamani (from Prakrit)
- Puratan Prabandha Sangraha
- Vishva Parichay
- Lal Kaner

== See also ==
- List of Indian writers
