= Bhadrabahu (disambiguation) =

Bhadrabahu (or Bhadrabahu I) was a 4th-century BC Indian Jain monk and writer.

Bhadrabahu may also refer to these later Jain monks from ancient India:

- Bhadrabahu II
- Bhadrabahu III

== See also ==
- Bhadra (disambiguation)
