= Prabandha =

Genre of medieval Indian Sanskrit literature

Prabandha is a literary genre of medieval Indian Sanskrit literature. The prabandhas contain semi-historical anecdotes about the lives of famous persons. They were written primarily by Jain scholars of western India (Gujarat and Malwa) from 13th century onwards. The prabandhas feature colloquial Sanskrit with vernacular expressions, and contain elements of folklore.

== Definition ==
The prabandhas are semi-historical anecdotes about famous persons. The Prabandha Kosha of Rajashekhara Suri mentions two types of biographical narratives: charitas and prabandhas. It states that the charitas are the life-stories of tirthankaras, kings and religious leaders up to Aryarakshita-Suri (who died in 30 CE). The biographies of persons born after Aryarakshita-Suri are called prabandhas. It is not clear if this is Rajashekhara's own definition or if it is based on some other authority. However, several later texts do not abide by this definition. For example, there are texts titled Kumarapala-Charita, Vastupala-Charita and Jagadu-Charita about people who flourished after the end of the 1st millennium CE.

Prabandhas were written primarily by Jain scholars from 13th century onwards. The authors were based in western India, and wrote primarily in colloquial Sanskrit (as opposed to Classical Sanskrit). The prabandhas make heavy use of vernacular (that is, non-Sanskrit) expressions, and often appear close to the folk tradition.

== Example texts ==
Trishashti-Shalaka-Purusha-Charitra by the 12th century Jain scholar Hemachandra contains legendary narratives about 63 persons. However, the earliest collection explicitly titled Prabandha- is Jinabhadra's Prabandhavali (1234 CE).

Some of the notable Prabandha collections include:

Prabandhavali by Jinabhadra, 1234 CE
It contains 40 prabandhas about historic personalities (most of them from western India), including Prithviraja Prabandha. It was composed at the request of Vastupala's son Jaitrasimha.
It is not available in complete form, but:
- Some of its contents have been included in Jinavijaya's 20th century collection Puratana Prabandha Samgraha
- Valabhi-Bhanga prabandha in Merutunga's Prabandha-Chintamani is also copied from Prabandhavali.
- The Padaliptacharya Prabandha and Ratna-Shravaka-Prabandha in Rajashekhara's Prabandha-Kosha are taken from Prabandhavali

Prabhavaka Charita by Prabhachandra, 1277 CE
It covers 22 Śvetāmbara Jain monks from Vajrasvamin to Hemachandra, as a continuation of Hemachandra's Parishishtaparvan (or Sthaviravali-Charita). It also includes anecdotes about historical kings and poets.

Laghu-Prabandha-Sangraha by anonymous, 13th century
It was compiled by a Gujarat-based poet between 1243 CE and 1409 CE. It contains 10 small prabandhas.

Prabandha-Chintamani of Merutunga, 1305 CE
It contains 135 prabandhas categorized under 11 topics and 5 prakashas (sections). It is an important source of history of early medieval Gujarat.

Vividha-Tirtha-Kalpa or Kalpa-Pradipa by Jinaprabha, 1333 CE
44 of its 63 chapters describes the Jain pilgrimage centres, but it also includes 7 kalpas or chapters covering biographies (that is, prabandhas).

Nabhi-nandana-jinoddhara-prabandha by Kakkasūri of the Upakeśa Gaccha, 1336 CE.
Records the renovation of the Rishabhanatha Jain temple in Shatrunjaya, and provides a history of the author's spiritual lineage (Upakesha-gaccha)

Prabandha Kosha of Rajashekhara Suri, 1349 CE
Also known as Chaturvinshati Prabandha, it contains 24 prabandhas. The personalities covered include 10 Suris (Jain teachers), 7 kings, 4 poets, and 3 Jain laymen.

Puratana-Prabandha-Samgraha by multiple writers, before 15th century
Also known as Prabandha-Chintamani-Samvada-Puratana-Sangraha, it contains 63 prabandhas, some borrowed from the earlier prabandha collections. In 20th century, Muni Jinavijaya found its manuscript (titled Prabandha-Sangraha) at Patan, and published it under the name Puratana-Prabandha-Sangraha.

Kumarapala-Prabandha by Jinamandana, 1435 CE
Contains 9 prabandhas about Kumarapala, and also provides information about his predecessors and ancestors.

Bhoja-Prabandha by Ballala (or Vallalasena), 16th century
This is a collection of stories about king Bhoja, which are historically unreliable, but provide entertainment value. It anachronistically places non-contemporary poets such as Kalidasa, Bana, Mayura, Bhavabhuti and Magha as Bhoja's contemporaries.
Verses of other poets such as Kalidasa, Subandhu and Magha appear in this collection. It also includes some content from Panchatantra.
It is not to be confused with 5 other works titled Bhoja-Prabandha (by Merutunga, Rajavallabha, Vatsaraja, Shubhashila and Padmagupta).

Panchashati-Prabandha-Sambandha by Shubhashila Gani, 1464 CE
Contains 625 prabandhas, which are brief accounts of Jain monks and laymen
