= Laghu-Prabandha-Saṅgraha =

Sanskrit story collection

- Original title: लघु-प्रबन्ध-सङ्ग्रहः
- Language: Sanskrit
- Genre: prabandha
- Set in: ancient and medieval India
- Publication date: Second half of the 13th century

Laghu-Prabandha-Saṅgraha is a 13th century Sanskrit-language collection of stories (prabandhas) from India. An anonymous work, it features stories about several Jain authors and royal patrons, mainly from the Chaulukya kingdom of present-day Gujarat.

== Authorship and date ==
All the prabandhas in the anonymous collection appear to have been written by a single person, as suggested by the homogenous style. The language of the text is Sanskrit, mixed with Prakrit and Old Gujarati words and expressions. At some places, the text includes non-Sanskrit sentences, paragraphs, and verses. The content (for example, the references to Anahilapura Pattana) and the language of the text suggest that the author was a medieval Jain writer from northern Gujarat.

A colophon entry in the manuscript copy mentions the date 1465 VS (1409 CE), which means that the original text must have been composed sometime earlier. The text could not have been composed before the 12th century, as it refers to several kings from that period, including Jayasimha Siddharaja (r.c. 1092-1142), Paramardi of Kalyana-koti-pura (identified with Vikramaditya VI, r.c. 1076-1126), Madanabhrama (identified with Madanavarman, r.c. 1128-1165), and the Paramara prince Jagadeva. Finally, it refers to the text Vasu-pujya-charitra, which is dated 1243 CE. Thus, the Laghu-Prabandha-Saṅgraha must have been composed sometime between 1243 and 1409.

The Laghu-Prabandha-Saṅgraha has some characters and stories (with variations) in common with the other Sanskrit works, especially other prabandha collections, such as the Prabandha Chintamani and the Puratana Prabandha Sangraha. In many cases, the Laghu-Prabandha-Saṅgraha version appears to be the oldest, being simpler, less polished, and more archaic in language. This does not mean that the compiler of the Laghu-Prabandha-Saṅgraha was the original writer of the stories: he may have borrowed the stories from older literature or oral tradition.

Since the Laghu-Prabandha-Saṅgraha appears to be older than the Prabandha Chintamani (1305), it was most probably composed during the second half of the 13th century.

== Critical edition ==
In 1970, Jayant Premshanker Thaker published a printed edition of the text, based on the following three Devanagari manuscripts from Baroda:

- 1409 CE manuscript, No. 82, Faculty of Arts (Maharaja Sayajirao University of Baroda)
- Undated manuscript, No. 2356, Pravartaka Kantivijayaji Collection No. 2356 (Atmananda Jaina Jinamandira)
- Undated manuscript, No. 681, Oriental Institute No. 681 (Maharaja Sayajirao University of Baroda)

Of these, only the 1409 CE manuscript contains the full text. The text seems to be based on folklore, because it contains several Prakrit and Old Gujarati words and passages. For example, the Sanskrit name "Jayasiṃha" sometimes appears in its colloquial form "Jayasingh".

The other two manuscripts contain only one story - that of Madanabhrama - with minor variations. Manuscript No. 2356 appears to be a copy of the 1409 CE manuscript, and No. 681 appears to be a copy of No. 2356. The successive scribes appear to have made attempts to correct and Sanskritize the previous work, although all the manuscripts include several scribal inaccuracies.

== Contents ==
The glory of kings lies in the tusks of elephants, of paupers in the shoulders of bulls, of warriors in the tip of [their] swords, [and] of ladies in [their] breasts

— The concluding stanza of the Laghu-prabandha-Saṅgraha

The text features stories (prabandhas) about several Jains, including authors and their royal patrons.

=== Jagaddeva ===
As a result of conspiracy by ministers, the Paramara prince Jagaddeva leaves his ancestral kingdom. He arrives in the kingdom of King Paramardi of Kalyana-koti-pura, where he pays 300,000 coins to a prostitute. Seeing his generosity, the King and his minister organize a dance and music performance for him. Happy with the performance, Jagaddeva tells the minister to ask for a boon. The minister asks for the rival kings' pets: the horse of the Gajana king Hammira and the elephant of the Gauda king Gajapati. Jagaddeva defeats Hammira, who had earlier attacked Pattana, and takes away his horse. He also procures the elephant from Gajapati, and gives both the animals to the minister.

=== Maharaja Madanabhrama ===
Maharaja ("Great King") Madanabhrama of Kanti lives in a luxurious palace, where he spends nearly all his time with his 5,585 queens and 9,000 other wives. One day, king Jayasimha-deva of Gujarata encamps near Madanabhrama's capital after completing a victorious twelve-year military campaign. Madana-bhrama's court poet refuses to eulogize Jayasimha, and therefore, Jayasimha decides to wage a war against Madanabhrama. The two kings eventually reconcile, and Madanabhrama tells Jayasimha to enjoy royal life instead of spending time on military campaigns. Jayasimha agrees, and Madanabhrama gifts him beautiful young women.

=== The Five-handled Royal Umbrella of Vikramaditya ===
One day, a lady named Deva-damini derides king Vikramaditya of Ujjayini for not possessing a royal umbrella with five handles. The king asks the lady's "elders" (old women) to prepare such an umbrella for him. The elders reply that they would do so only for someone who would fulfill their five desires, and outline these desires. In five sub-stories, Vikramaditya goes through a series of fantastical adventures to fulfill the desires, marrying Deva-damini and another princess in the process. He is thus able to secure the royal umbrella with five handles.

=== The Construction of the Lake Sahasra-linga ===
One day, a Vyasa narrates the following story to king Jayasimha-deva of Patana: During the reign of king Rina-malla of Sura-dhara-pura, there was a well with little water in Saurashtra, from which it was very difficult to get water. Once, a Chandala woman quenched the thirst of a calf with the water from this well. For this meritorious deed, in her next birth, she was born as Kamala-vati, a daughter of king Vishva-deva of Kannauja. She married Rina-malla's son Vayarasala, and came to Saurashtra. There, she remembered her previous birth after seeing the scanty water in the well.

After listening to this story, Jayasimha commissions the construction of the lake Sahasra-linga at the site of the former Durlabha-lake.

=== The Raulanis Siddhi and Buddhi ===
One day, two pilgrims tell a sage that they are from Patana, where king Jayasimha-deva has adopted the title Siddha-Chakravartin. Siddhi and Buddhi, two raulanis (female supernatural beings) from Kamarupitha of Gauda country, overhear this conversation. They go to Patana, and ask Jayasimha to give up his title, insisting that a person cannot be a Siddha (one with supernatural powers) and a Chakravartin (a universal ruler) at the same time. To prove the king's siddhi (supernatural powers) to the raulanis, his subject Haripala gets a special sword prepared with a blade made of sugar and a handle made of iron. The king receives the sword in front of the raulanis, pretending that it was a gift from another king. He puts the blade of the sword in his mouth, and eats it. He then gives the remaining part of the sword - the iron handle - to the raulanis, who are unable to swallow it. The raulanis accept their defeat and fly away, and the king honours Haripala.

=== Namala the Female Florist ===
After king Jayasimha returns to his capital from a successful military campaign, his mother Mayanala-devi asks him to visit the Parshvanatha shrine at Dabhol. At Dabhol, Jaya-simha meets a florist named Namala, who is a padmini (the most excellent type of) woman. She agrees to marry Jayasimha on the condition that no one would insult her. After they return to the capital, the daughter of an oil-man turns her face away from Namala. When Namala feels insulted, the girl explains that she did so to prevent the oil lamp's odour from spreading into Namala's litter. Another anecdote follows, in which Namala feels insulted by the daughter-in-law of a washerman.

=== The Jugglers Ganaya and Manaya ===
Jayasimha-deva's royal priest Yashodhara entrusts his two sons Khima-dhara and Deva-dhara to a Jain scholar. During a trip, the two boys learn the art of juggling and dramaturgy from a juggler named Gaja-raja in Kamarupa. Once, dressed as females, they perform in front of a foreign king in the east. As a result of the king's reward, they become wealthy, and become known as the jugglers Ganaya and Manaya. Sometime later, they leave Kamarupa, and learn about a battle between the kings Jayasimha and Paramardi. Using their magical powers, they force Paramardi's army to retreat, and return to their home in Jayasimha's capital Patan. However, they find that their house had been occupied by their relatives, and start wandering in the city. Deva-dhara takes the form of a crocodile, and enters the Sahasra-linga lake. After several unsuccessful attempts to catch the crocodile, the king discovers the brothers' true identity. With the king's help, they regain their house and their hereditary priesthood.

=== Kumara Rana ===
Kumara Ranaka, the ruler of the city of Kidi-mankodi, has several female attendants who massage him, sing for him, and play music for him. One night, conch-blowing sounds by a group of pilgrims going to Saurashtra awakens him. Ranaka also decides to go on this pilgrimage, and starts his journey on an auspicious day. At Chandasama, he deposits his jewels with a merchant who was constructing a lake there. When Ranaka returns from the pilgrimage, the merchant refuses to hand over the jewels to him. The two men take their dispute to king Jayasimha, before whom the merchant declares that the water would not remain in the lake if he had taken the jewels from Ranaka. Immediately, the water gushes out of the lake, which becomes known as "Phūțelau" ("the broken one"). With the king's permission, Ranaka constructs a cottage beside the lake, and practises penance there till his death.

=== Shrimata ===
King Lakhara-sena rules from his capital Lakhanavati. One day, his minister and astrologer Umapati Shridhara predicts that the queen will give birth to a son, who will fall in love with a girl from the lowest class at the age of 34. Consequently, the king sends the queen to a distant village where she delivers a son - Ratnapunja. When the boy grows up and learns about the prophecy, he vows to remain a lifelong celibate. Ratnapunja ascends the throne after his father dies, and at the age of 32, is attracted to young woman of the low-status Matanga class. After the minister's spy sees him talking to the woman, he decides to commit suicide out of shame, but the minister prevents him from doing so.

Sometime later, an astrologer predicts that a pregnant woman from Shrimala-pura will give birth to a boy who will become the king of the country. Ratnapunja orders the woman to be buried alive in a forest. Before she is buried, the woman gives birth to a boy, who survives on the milk of a deer. The royal mint automatically starts striking coins featuring the image of a deer. After making inquiries, the king adopts the boy, names him Shri-punja, and crowns him as the new king when he grows up. Some time later, a monkey-faced daughter, named Shri-mata, is born to Shri-punja. One day, after hearing songs glorifying the Arbuda mountain, Shri-mata remembers her previous birth: she was a monkey who died as a result of a snake-bite. Her body fell into a lake, but her head remained stuck in a bamboo grove, because of which she was reborn with a monkey's head. At the king's orders, his officers find the monkey's head and throw it in the lake. Shri-mata's head then turns human. She becomes a celibate and engages in penance on the Arbuda mountain. After her death, she becomes the tutelary deity of the mountain.

=== Gala Shri Varddhamana-suri ===
The Jain religious leader Vardhamana-suri lives at Vamana-sthali, in the kingdom of Brhaspati Ranaka. One day, a dialectician named Deva-maha-nanda arrives at Shri-pattana from the Gauda country, and challenges people to a debate. At the command of the goddess Sarasvati, Varddhamana-suri instructs his two disciples, Vaghalau and Singhalau, to defeat Deva-maha-nanda. He makes the two disciples sip a magical nectar, which makes them highly knowledgeable. During their journey to Shri-pattana, Varddhamana-suri subsides a flood in the Deyi River using his spiritual powers. After an 18-day debate, the two disciples defeat Deva-maha-nanda, who dies of distress. The deceased dialectician's wealth is used to build 24 Jain monasteries with residential facilities for monks. Vardhamana-suri composes a text named Vasu-pujya-charitra.
