= Girnar Jain temples =

Complex of Śvetāmbara Jain temples in Junagadh district, Gujarat

Jain temples, Girnar
- Raivatak, Raivatachal
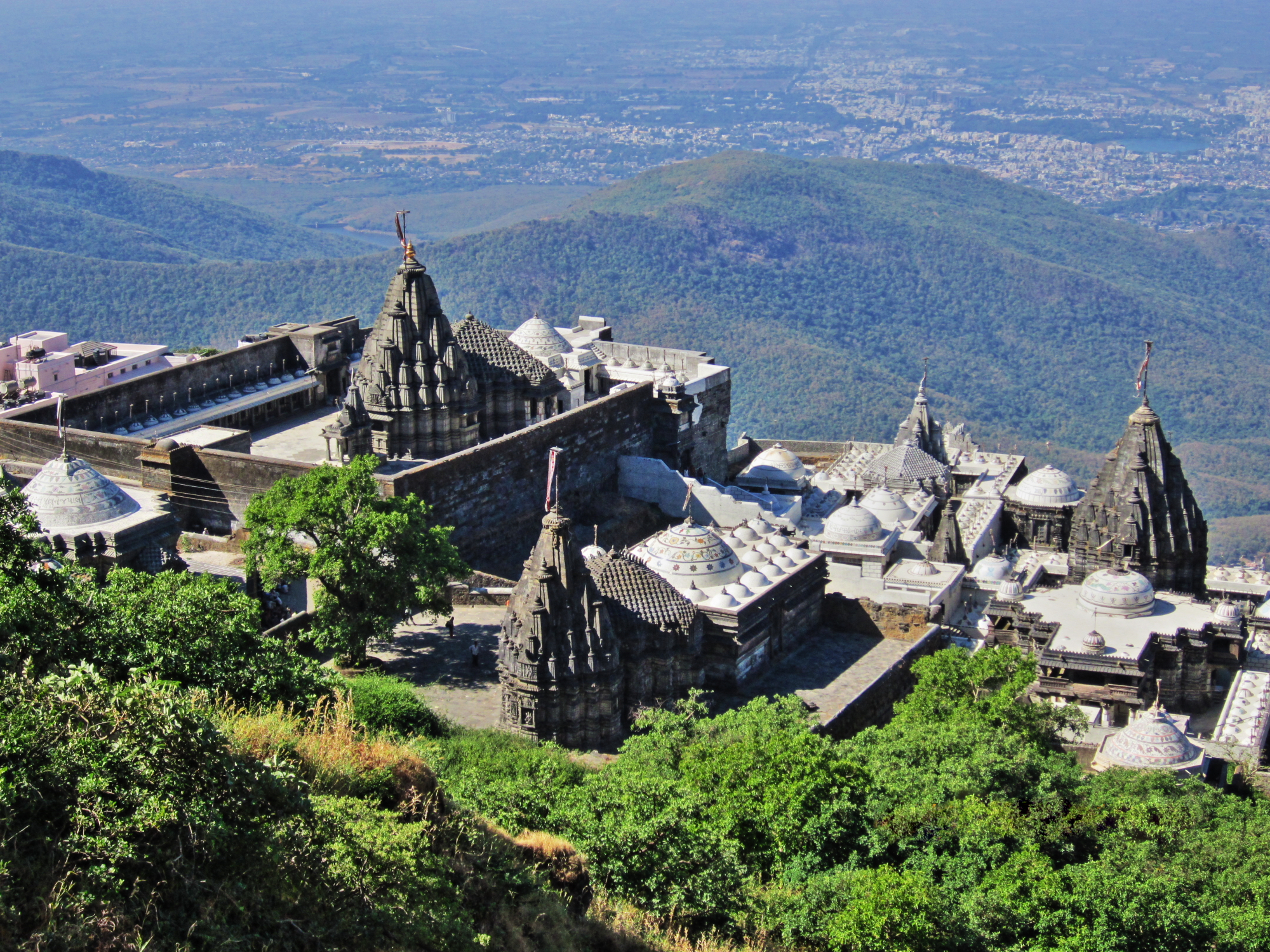
- The cluster of Jain temples on Girnar mountain near Junagadh, Gujarat

- Location of Girnar Jain temples in Gujarat

Religion
- Affiliation: Jainism
- Sect: Śvetāmbara
- Deity: Neminath
- Festivals: Paryushana, Mahavir Janma Kalyanak
- Governing body: Anandji Kalyanji Trust

Location
- Location: Girnar near Junagadh, Junagadh district, Gujarat
- Coordinates: 21.5266295°N 70.5222246°E

There is a group of temples of Jainism on Mount Girnar near Junagadh in Junagadh district, Gujarat, India. From the 14 temples that are on the hill about 3500 to 4000 steps from bhavnathi taleti and sahesavan, diksha and kevalgyan kalyanak bhumi and nirvan kalyanak bhumi most all the temples belong to the Śvetāmbara sect, only one or two belong to the Digambara sect. The hill and some of the temples are considered sacred by both Digambara and the Śvetāmbara branches of Jainism.

== In Jainism ==
Lord Neminath, also called Arishtanemi, the 22nd Tirthankara, became an ascetic after he saw that animals tied up to be slaughtered for the feast on his wedding were crying and screaming to be released. Seeing this he realised that due to his wedding thousands of animals were to be killed. He renounced all worldly pleasures and went to Mount Girnar to attain salvation. He attained omniscience and Moksha (Nirvana) from the highest peak of Mount Girnar. His bride-to-be Rajulmati also renounced the world and became a nun, and followed him to the sacred mountain.

Girnar along with Ashtapad, Shikharji, Dilwara Temples of Mount Abu and Palitana temples on Shatrunjaya are known as Śvetāmbara Pancha Tirth (five principal pilgrimage shrines).

== Jain Temples ==
Girnar was anciently called Raivata or Ujjayanta, sacred amongst the Jains to Neminath, the 22nd Tirthankara, and a place of pilgrimage since before 250 BCE.

Situated on the first plateau of Mount Girnar at the height of about 3800 steps, at an altitude of 2370 ft above Junagadh, still some 600 ft below the first summit of Girnar, there are Jain temples with marvelous carvings in marble.

Some 16 Jain temples are grouped on the ledge at the top of the great cliff along the west face of the hill, and are all enclosed.

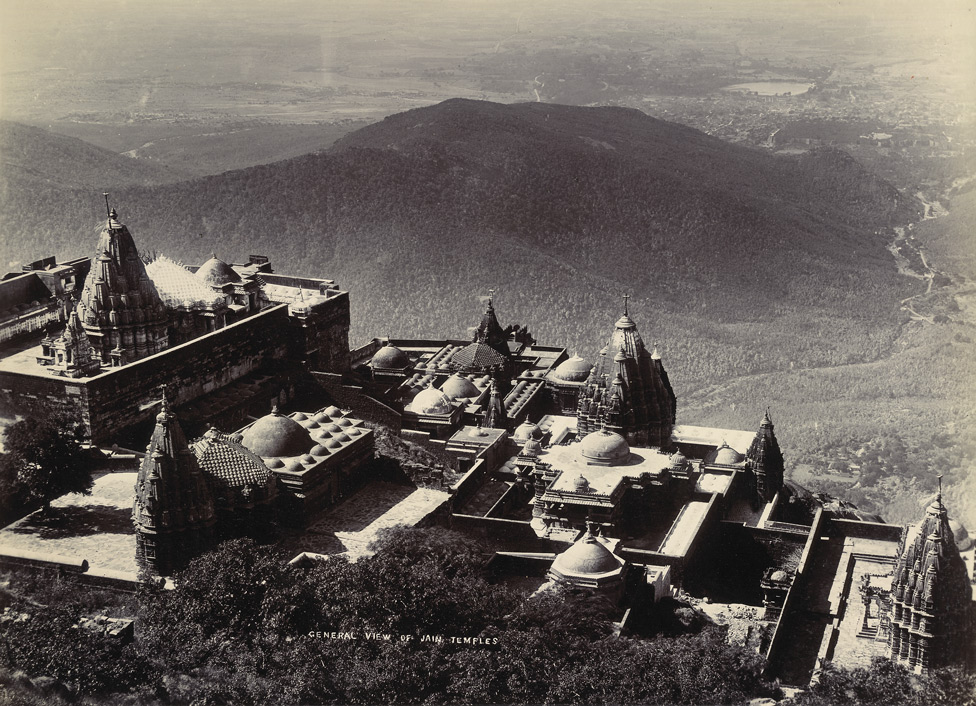
General view of Jain temples on the Girnar Hills looking back down towards Junagadh city

=== Neminath Temple ===
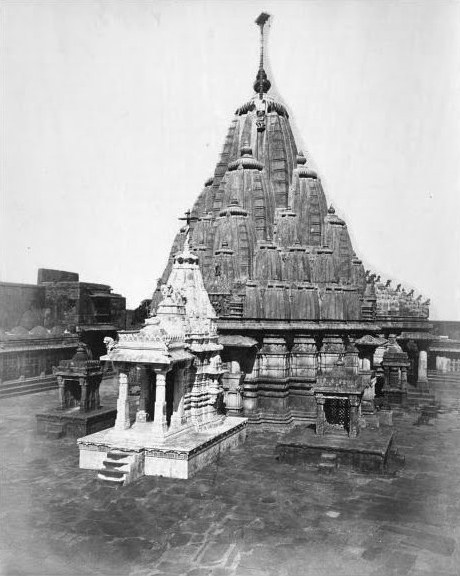
Neminath Temple in 1911, from northeast

The Neminath temple was rebuilt completely by Sajjana, the governor of Saurashtra appointed by Jayasimha Siddharaja of Solanki dynasty, in 1129 CE.

It is built in Māru-Gurjara architecture (Solaṅkī style). It is west-facing and built from black-grey granite. The central temple has three components; mulaprasada (central shrine) and two halls: gudhamandapa (principal hall) and second mandapa (outer hall).

The Neminath temple was gilded with many gold plates by Mandalika I, The Ra of Saurashtra (Chudasama dynasty), In 1364 CE.

The mulprasada is of sandhara style, the sanctum having a circumambulatory passage (pradakshina) around it. It contains a large black image of Neminath. The exterior of the mulprasada is sparsely carved.

The roof of the gudhamandapa (principal hall) in front of the mulaprasada is supported by 22 square columns of granite. There are vestibules on the north and south sides leading to gates and on the east leading to the sanctum. The ceiling is about 15 feet (4.6 m) in diameter of carved black stone in multiple layers. The floor is of tessellated marble. The exterior of the gudhamandapa is also simple and sparsely carved.

A new second mandapa (outer hall) was added to the west of the gudhamandapa in 17th century in place of the previously existing pau-mandapa. It houses two small raised platforms paved with slabs of yellow stone, covered with representations of feet in pairs called padukas, which represent the feet of the 420 Ganadharas, first disciples of Tirthankaras. On the west of the mandapa, there is a closed west entrance with a porch overhanging the perpendicular scarp of the hill.

The central temple is the largest temple of the group standing in a quadrangular floored court. The court is surrounded inside by 67 shrine cells, each enshrining a marble image on a bench, with a covered passage running round in front of them. The principal east entrance was closed in or after the 19th century and converted into a room where idols are installed. The south and north entrances are located between the series of shrine cells.

=== Adabadji Adinatha temple ===
There are three temples to the left of the passage from the north porch of the Neminath temple. Of them, the temple on the south contains a colossal image of Adinatha, the first Tirthankara, exactly like that at Palitana temples. The image is in standing meditating (kausaggiya) position On the throne of this image is a slab of yellow stone carved in 1442, with figures of the 24 Tirthankars.

=== Panchmeru temple ===
On the north, opposite the Adabadji temple, there is Panchabai's or Panchmeru temple which was built in VS 1859. It contains five sikhars or spires each enshrining quadruple images.

=== Meraka-vasahi ===
West of Panchmeru temple, there is a large temple. The temples is called Malekavasahi, Merakavasahi or Merakavashi due to false identification. Madhusudan Dhaky noted that the Merakavasahi was a small shrine somewhere near east gate of Neminatha temple while the current temple is large one and outside the north gate of the Neminatha temple. Based on its architecture, Dhaky dates the temple to 15th century and notes that it is mentioned as Kharataravasahi built or restored by Bhansali Narpal Sanghavi in the old itineraries by Jain monks. The temple is depicted in the Shatrunjaya-Giranar Patta dated 1451 CE (VS 1507) in Ranakpur temple so it must have built before it. The temple may have been built as early as 1438 CE. Dhaky believes that the temple may have been built on the site of the Satyapuravatara Mahavira's temple built by Vastupala.

According to an anecdote by modern Jain writers, Sajjana, the minister of Chaulukya king Siddharaja Jayasimha, built the Neminatha temple using the state treasury. When he collected the funds to return as a compensation, the king declined to accept it so the funds were used to build this temple instead. Dhaky concludes that the anecdote is not mentioned in any early work and is false.

Sahastraphana (thousand hooded) Parshwanatha, the image which was consecrated in 1803 CE (VS 1459) by Vijayajinendra Suri, is currently the central deity in the temple. The temple originally housed the golden image of Mahavira and brass images of Shantinatha and Parshwanatha on its sides.

The east facing temple has 52 small shrines surrounding the central temple. It has an open portico with ceilings with fine carvings. In the bhamti or cloisters surrounding the court, there are also some remarkable designs in carved ceilings. The roof of the rangamandapa has fine carvings. The shrine proper must have been removed and replaced with new one at the end of the sixteenth century or the start of the seventeenth century. It is known that Karmachandra Bachchhavat, minister of the king of Bikaner, had sent a funds to renovate temple in Shatrunjaya and Girnar under Jinachandrasuri IV of Kharatara Gaccha during the reign of Akbar. There is a shrine housing replica of Ashtapada hill in the south, shrine with Shatrunjayavatar in west, behind the main temple, and Samet Shikhar (or Nandishwar Dwipa) in north.

=== Sangram Soni's Temple ===
North of the Melakavasahi, there is a temple of Parshwanath in the enclosure. The original temple on the site was Kalyanatraya temple dedicated to Neminatha built by Tejapala, brother of Vastupala, the prime minister of Vaghelas of Gurjarat . This Kalyanatraya contained quadruple images in three tires as the central deity. The new temple on the site was built in 1438 CE (VS 1494) by Oswal Soni Samarasimha and Vyavahari Maladev. The spire of this 15th century temple is replaced by new spire built c. 1803 CE. The temple is now mistakenly known as Sangram Soni's temple. It was repaired by Premabhai Hemabhai about 1843. It contains a large white marble figure of Parswanatha bearing the date 1803 CE with the polycephalous cobra over him whence he is styled Seshphani. This temple is peculiar in having a sort of gallery and like the previous one of the central deity faces the east whilst the others mostly face the west.

=== Kumarapala's Temple ===
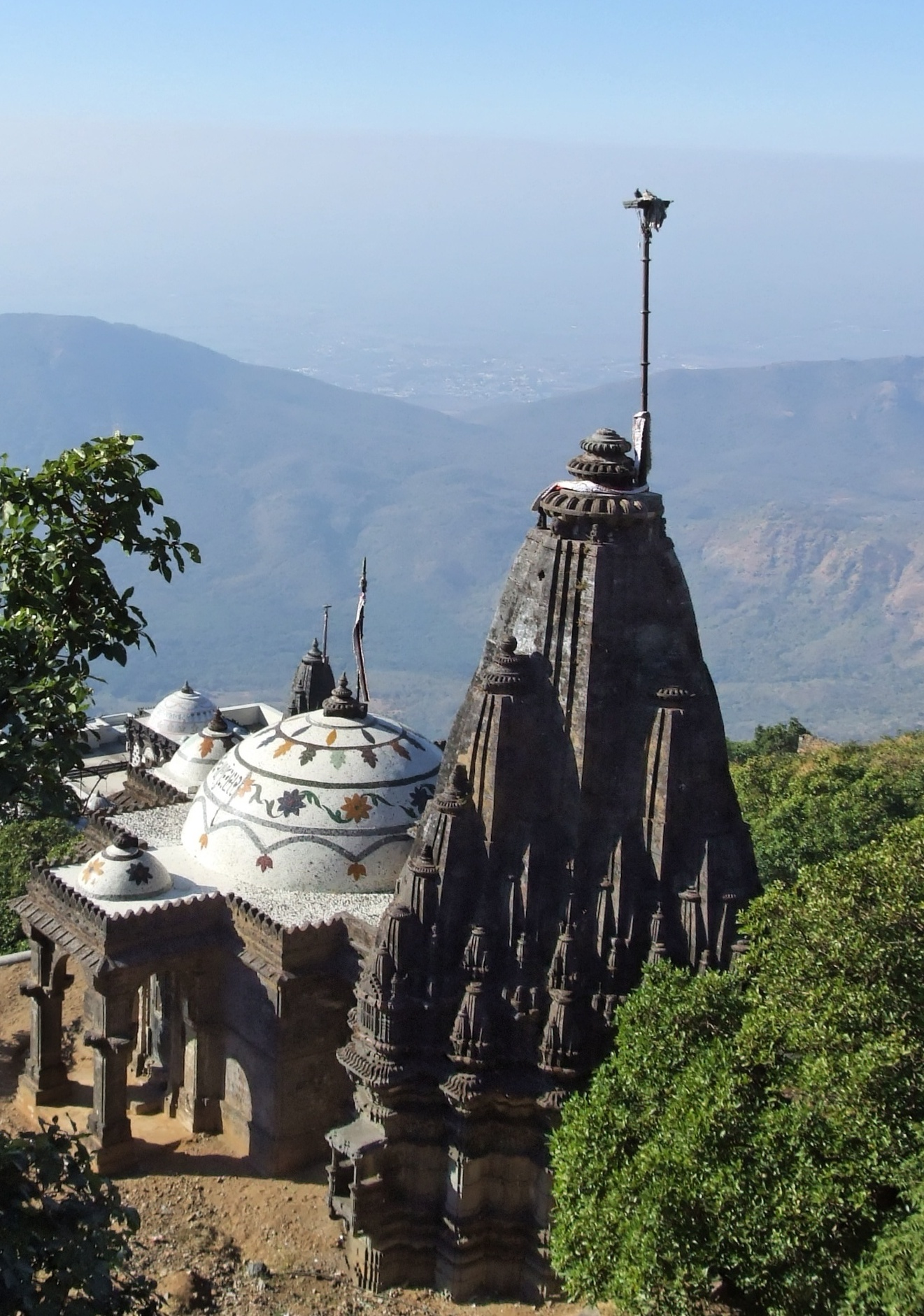
Kumarapala temple

The last temple to the north is known as the Kumarapala's temple which is falsely attributed to 12th century Chaulukya king Kumarapala. Based on the literary, epigraphic and architectural evidence, Madhusudan Dhaky concluded that the temple belongs to 15th century and was built by Purnasinha Koshthagarika (Punsi Kothari). The central deity was Shantinatha and was consecrated by Jinakirti Suri probably in 1438 CE. The part of the original temple was destroyed by the 18th century and appears to have been restored in 1824 CE by Hansraja Jetha which is known from the inscription.

The temple is west facing. The original temple had 72 shrines surrounding the central temple which no longer exist. The central temple has a modern long open portico supported by twenty four columns. The temple proper or mandapa and shrine are small and the ceilings and architraves are restored. The mandapa with its beautiful pendentive and the pillars and lintels of the portico. The shrine contains three images; in the middle Abhinandana Swami dedicated in 1838 and on either side Adinatha and Sambhavanatha dated 1791.

=== Mansingha Bhojaraja temple ===
To the east of the Devakota, there are several temples: the principal being the temple of Mansingha Bhojaraja of Kachchh, an old granite temple near the entrance gate which is now dedicated to Sambhavanatha.

=== Vastupala-vihara ===
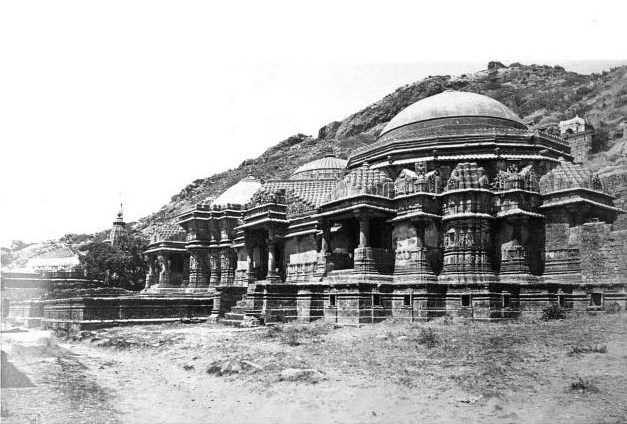
Vastupala Vihara

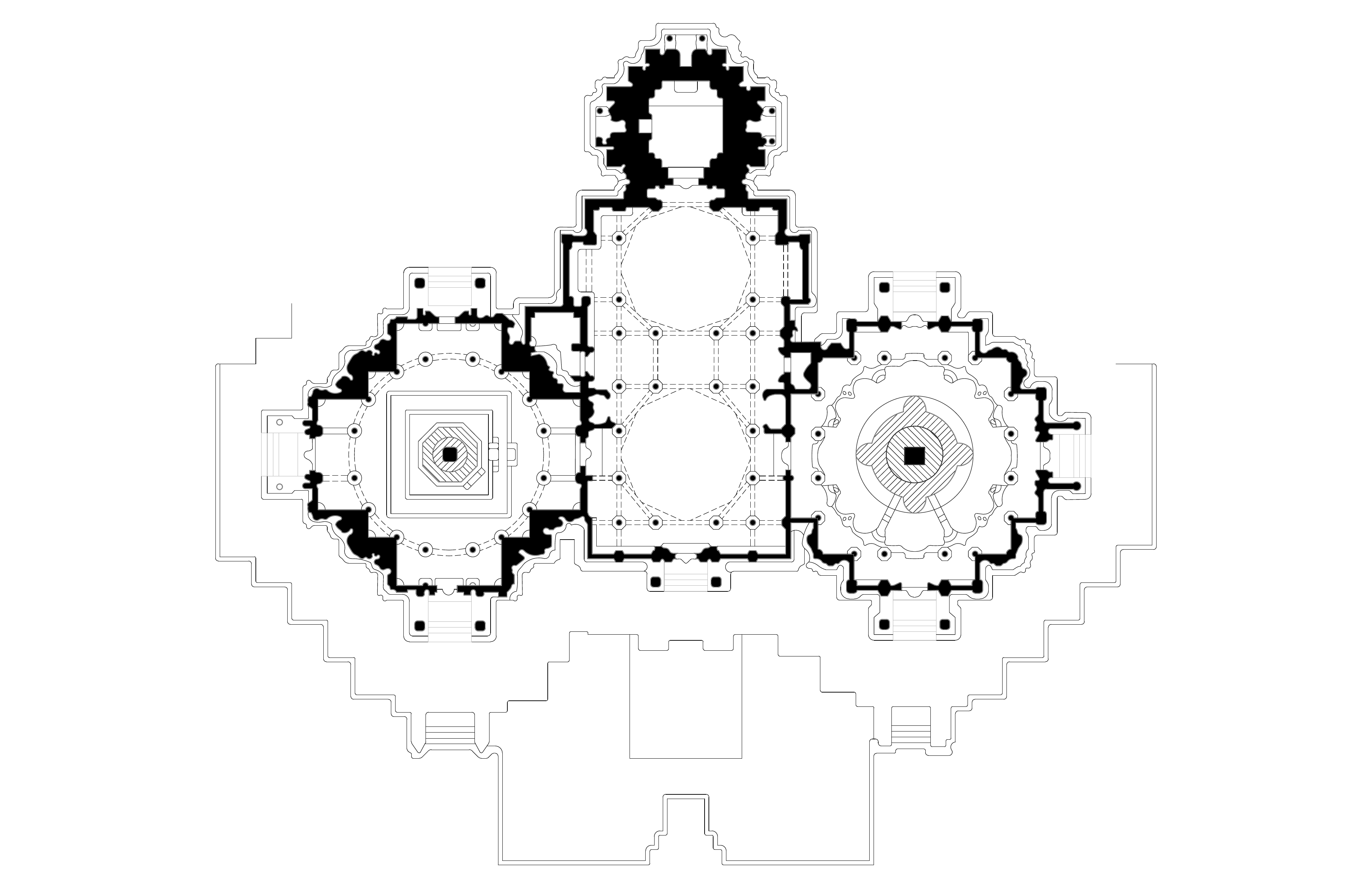
Plan of Vastupala-vihara

Vastupala-vihara is a triple temple, the central fane measuring 53 feet by 29 1/2 has two domes and is finely carved but much mutilated, and the shrine which is 13 feet square with a large niche or gokhla on the left side which contains an image of Mallinatha. Beneath the image is the inscription mentioning Vastupala and his family members.

On either side of this central temple, there is a large hall about 38 feet 6 inches from door to door, each containing a remarkable solid pile of masonry called a samovasarana, that on the north side named Sumeru having a square base, and the other Sameta Sikhara with a nearly circular one. Each rises in four tiers of diminishing width almost to the roof and is surmounted by a small square canopy over the images. The upper tiers are reached by steps arranged for the purpose. On the outside of the shrine tower are three small niches in which images have been placed and there are stone ladders up to the niches to enable the pujaris to reach them. The temple was completed in 1232 CE. There are six large inscriptions of Vastupala in the temple dated VS 1288. Originally Shatrunjayavatara Adinatha was the central deity of the temple. The roofs of temple were rebuilt in the 15th century.

There is another temple on the cliff behind the Vastupala-vihara which is now known as Gumasta temple. The temple was built by Vastupala and was dedicated to Marudevi. Another shrine behind Vastupala-vihara is dedicated to Kapardi Yaksha.

=== Samprati Raja temple ===
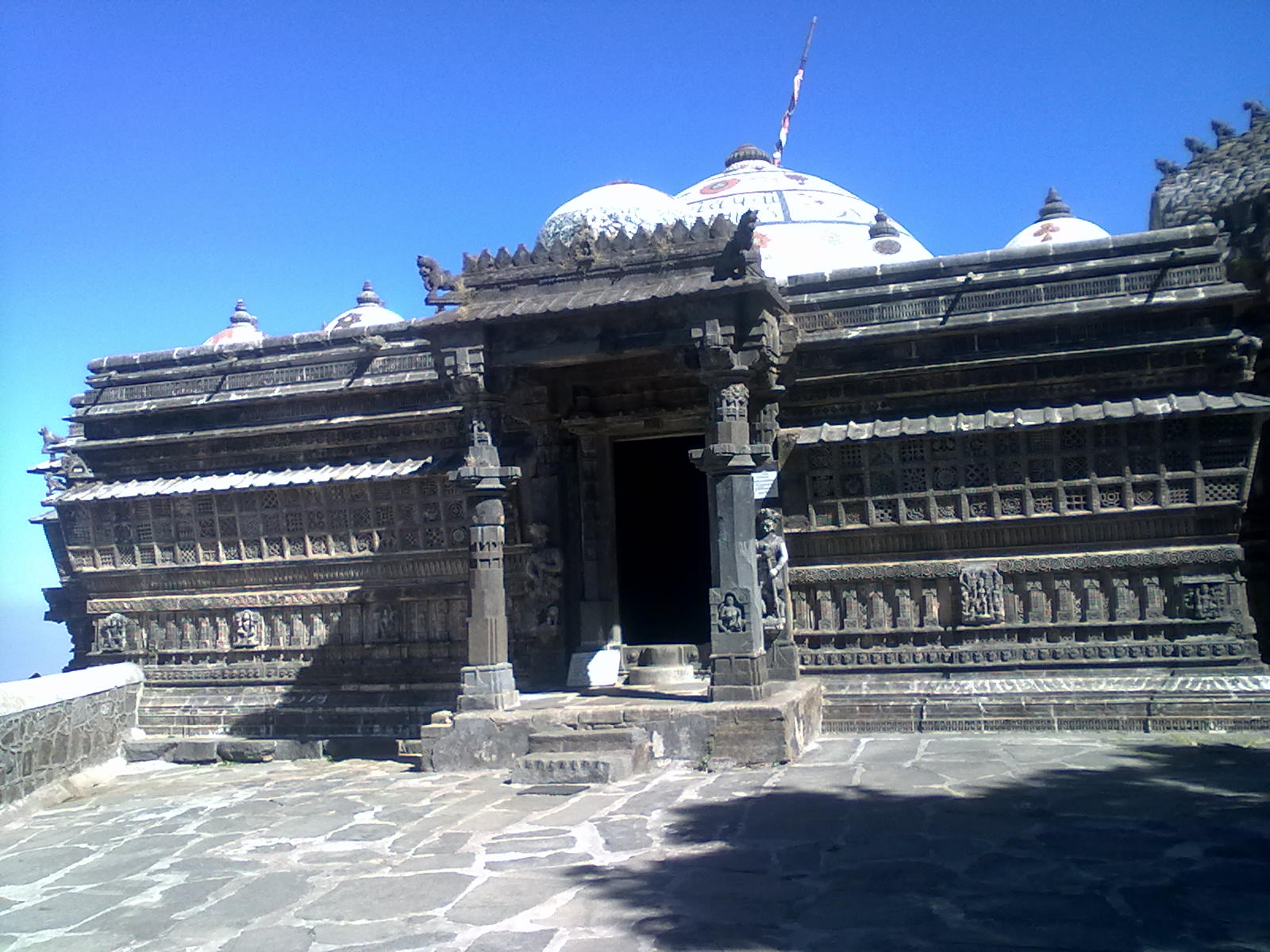
Samprati Raja temple

Farther north of the Vastupala-vihara, the Samprati Raja temple is situated. The temple was built in 1453 (VS 1509) CE by Shanraj and Bhumbhav from Khambhat. It was originally dedicated to Vimalanatha. According to Dhaky, the temple was built on the site of Stambhanatirthavatara Parshwanatha temple built by Vastupala. The temple is mistakenly attributed to Maurya ruler Samprati.

It is built against the side of a cliff and is ascended to by a stair. Inside the entrance there is another very steep flight of steps in the porch leading up to a large mandapa to the east of which is added a second mandapa and a gambhara or shrine containing a black image of Neminatha dedicated by Karnarama Jayaraja in 1461.

=== Other temples ===
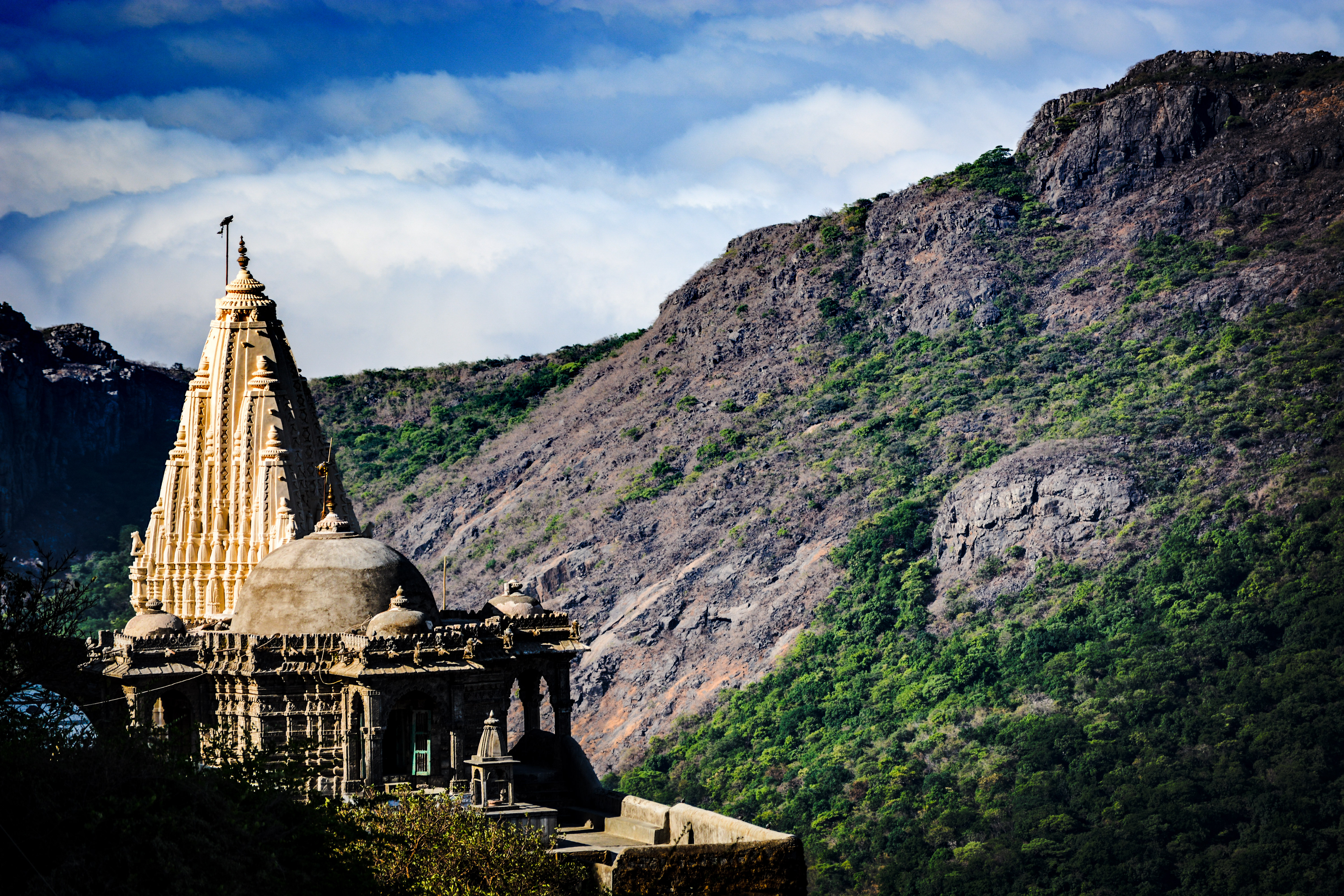
Dharamchand Hemchand temple

To the east of Vastupala-vihara and Samprati Raja temples, and on the face of the hill above, there are other temples. Among them is an old one known as Dharmasa of Mangrol or Dharamchand Hemchand, built of grey granite, the idol being also of granite. Near it is another ruined shrine in which delicate granite columns rise from the corners of the sinhasana, or throne carved with many squatting figures. Near this is the only shrine on this mount to Mahavira.

South of this, and 200 feet above the Jain temples on the way to the first summit, is the Gaumukhi shrine, a spring of water.

Away to the north, down the steps, there are two shrines dedicated to Neminatha in Sahsavan where he said to have taken renunciation and attained omniscience. Neminatha is said to have attained Nirvana or died on the highest peak of the Girnar. There is also a modern Samovasarana temple.

=== Ambika temple ===
The early temple dedicated to Ambika was built before 784 CE (probably in the middle of the 8th century). An inscription dated Vikram Samvat 1249 (1192 CE) mentions minister Vastupala's pilgrimage to Ambika temple. Narendraprabhsuri mentions that Vastupala had installed idols of himself and his brother Tejapala in the temple. Jinharshasuri mentions that Vastupala and his brother Tejapala visited as well as built the large mandapa of the temple and parikara of Ambika. A praśasti eulogy given at the end in a golden lettered copy of Kalpasutra dated Vikram Samvat 1524 (1468 CE) mentions that a Shreshthi (merchant) named Samal Sah restored and renovated the Ambika temple on Girnar. The present temple was built around the 15th century.

=== Other peaks ===
The three peaks next to Ambika temple peak are currently known as Gorakhnath, Oghadnath and Guru Dattatrey peaks. These peaks were previously known as Avlokan, Samb and Pradyumna peaks according to inscriptions by Vastupala as well as other inscriptions of similar and later periods. Jinsen's Harivanshapurana (Samvat 784) and Skandapurana also mention these old names. Vastupala's six inscriptions of Samvat 1288 (1232 CE) mention that he had built shrines dedicated to Neminatha on these peaks.

== Tanks ==
Outside to the north of the Kumarapala's temple, there is the Bhima Kunda, a tank measuring 70 feet by 50 feet. Below it and on the verge of the cliff is a smaller tank of water and near it a small canopy supported by three roughly hewn pillars and a piece of rock containing a short octagonal stone called Hathi pagla or Gajapada, the elephant foot, a stratum on the top of which is of light granite and the rest of dark the lower part is immersed in water most of the year.

== Gallery ==
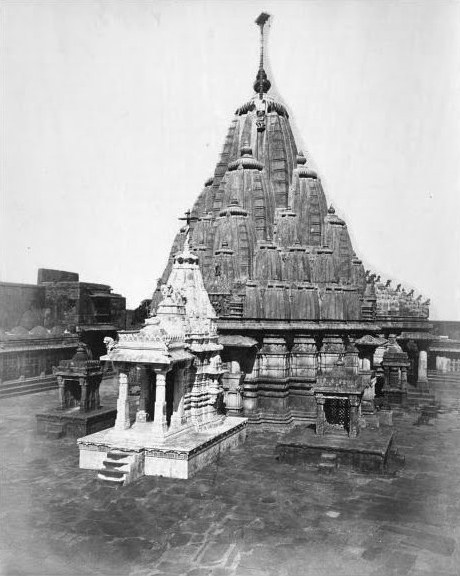
Neminath Temple in 1876

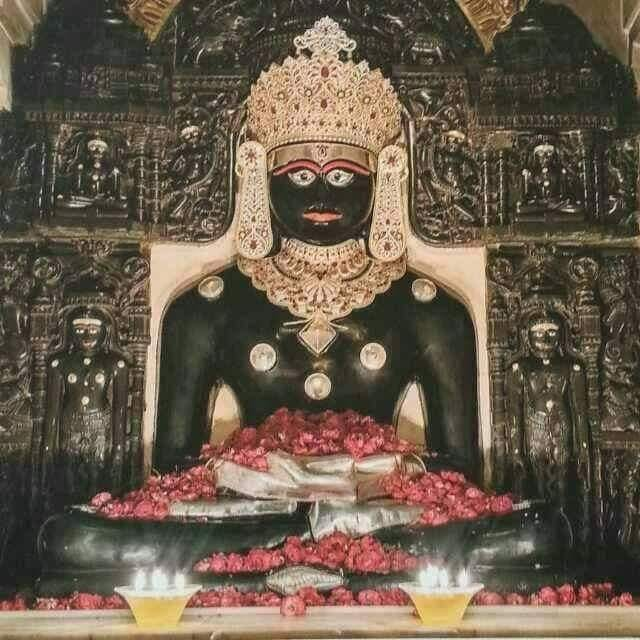
Neminatha idol

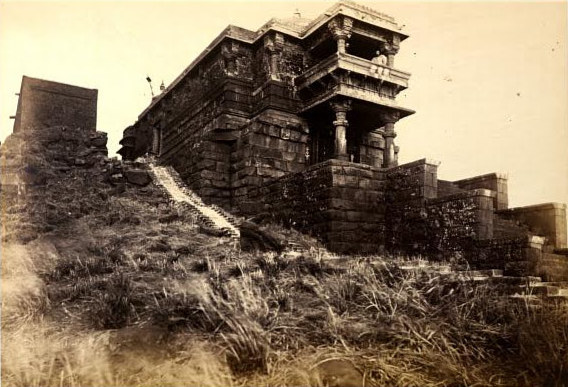
Ambika Mata temple

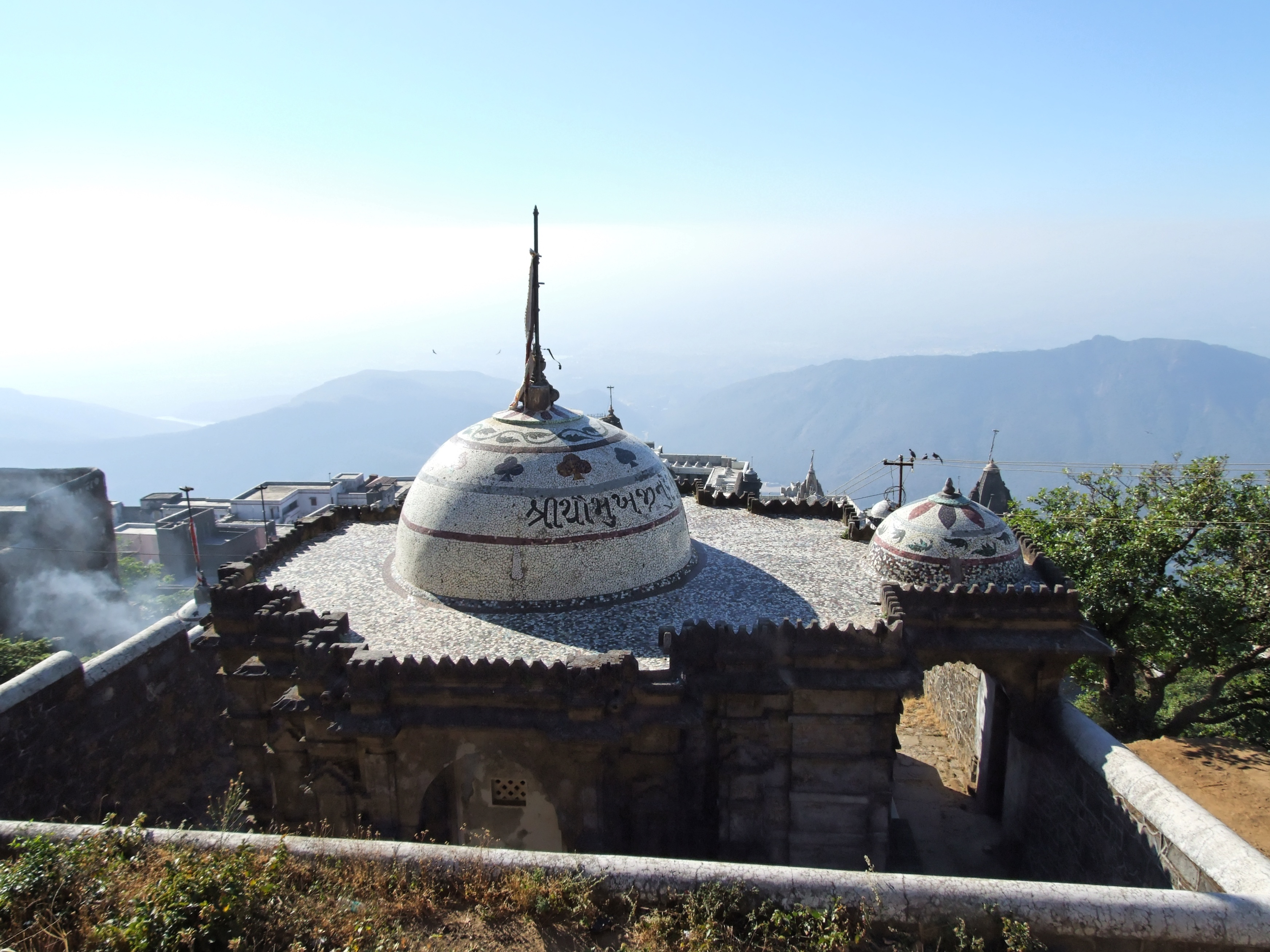
Chaumukhji Temple

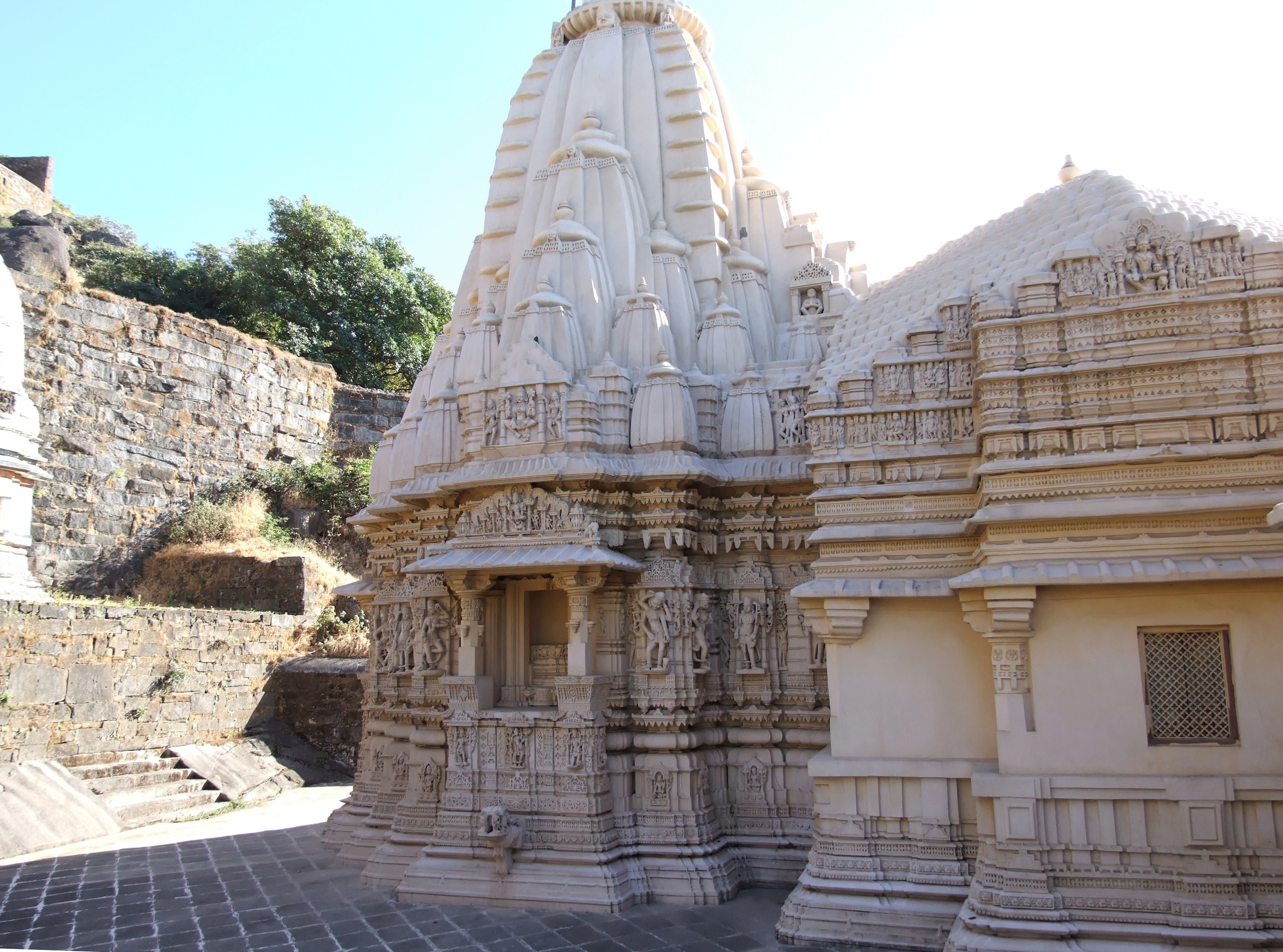
Vastupala Vihara

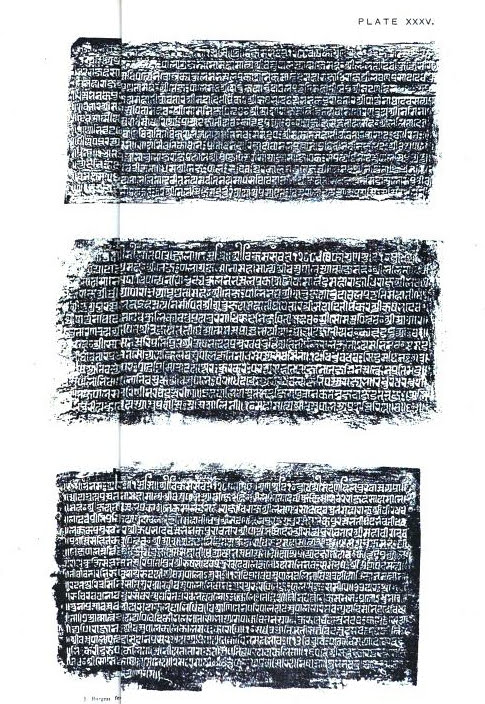
Inscription of the Vastupala-vihara on Mount Girnar

== See also ==
- Neminatha
- List of Jain temples
