= Anamdas Ka Potha =

Novel by Hazari Prasad Dwivedi

- Author: Hazari Prasad Dwivedi
- Language: Hindi
- Genre: Love story
- Publisher: Rajkamal Prakashan
- Publication place: India

Anamdas Ka Potha (Hindi: अनामदास का पोथा) is a Hindi novel, written by an Indian Hindi writer Hazari Prasad Dwivedi. This novel's genre is love story and published by Rajkamal Prakashan.
