= Jinvijay =

Scholar of orientalism, India (1888–1976)

Personal life
- Born: Kishansinh Parmar; 27 January 1888 Rupaheli, Mewad
- Died: 3 June 1976 (aged 88)
- Occupation: Scholar of orientalism, archeology, indology and Jainism

Religious life
- Religion: Jainism
- Sect: Śvētāmbara; Sthānakavāsī

Muni Jinvijayji (27 January 1888 – 3 June 1976) was a scholar of orientalism, archeology, indology and Jainism from India.

== Biography ==
Jinvijay was born in Rupaheli, Mewad near Udaipur on 27 January 1888 to Vriddhisinh and Rajkumari. His birth name was Kishansinh Parmar. He lost his parents at early age and after his contact with Muni Devihans, he was interested in Jainism. He was initiated as Sthanakvasi Jain monk in 1903. He was later initiated in Samvegi order of Śvetāmbara Jain monks (Murtipujaka sect) and was given new name, Muni Jinvijay. He learned Sanskrit and Prakrit literature under Kantivijay, a Jain ascetic from Patan, Gujarat.

He renounced monkhood and decided to live as a professor. He joined Gujarat Vidyapith as a principal of archeology department for few years on invitation of Mahatma Gandhi. He went to Germany in 1928 to study Indology. He returned to India in 1929. He participated in the Salt March of Indian independence movement in 1930 and was imprisoned at Nasik Jail where he met K. M. Munshi. He joined Shantiniketan as a professor of Jain literature and taught there from 1932 to 1936. He headed archeology department of Bharatiya Vidya Bhavan in 1939. He became honorary director of Rajasthan Oriental Research Institute in 1950. He served as a head of history and archeology department of Gujarati Sahitya Parishad. He retired in 1967. He died following lung cancer on 3 June 1976 at Ahmedabad.

== Works ==
He had published more than 20 books and edited and translated several others.

=== Selected works ===
- A catalogue of Sanskrit and Prakrit manuscripts in the Rajasthan Oriental Research Institute : Jodhpur collection
- Prabandhakośa (editor)
- Prabandhacintāmaṇi (editor)
- Puratana Prabandha Sangraha (editor), 1936
- Kumārapāla caritrasaṃgraha
- Karṇāmṛta-prapā
- Hetubinduṭīkā
- Auktikapada
- Uktiyaka
- Sandesh Rasak, 1945

== Recognition ==
He was awarded the Padma Shri, the fourth highest civilian award in India, in 1961 for his contributions in the field of literature and education.
