= Vividha Tirtha Kalpa =

Jain text

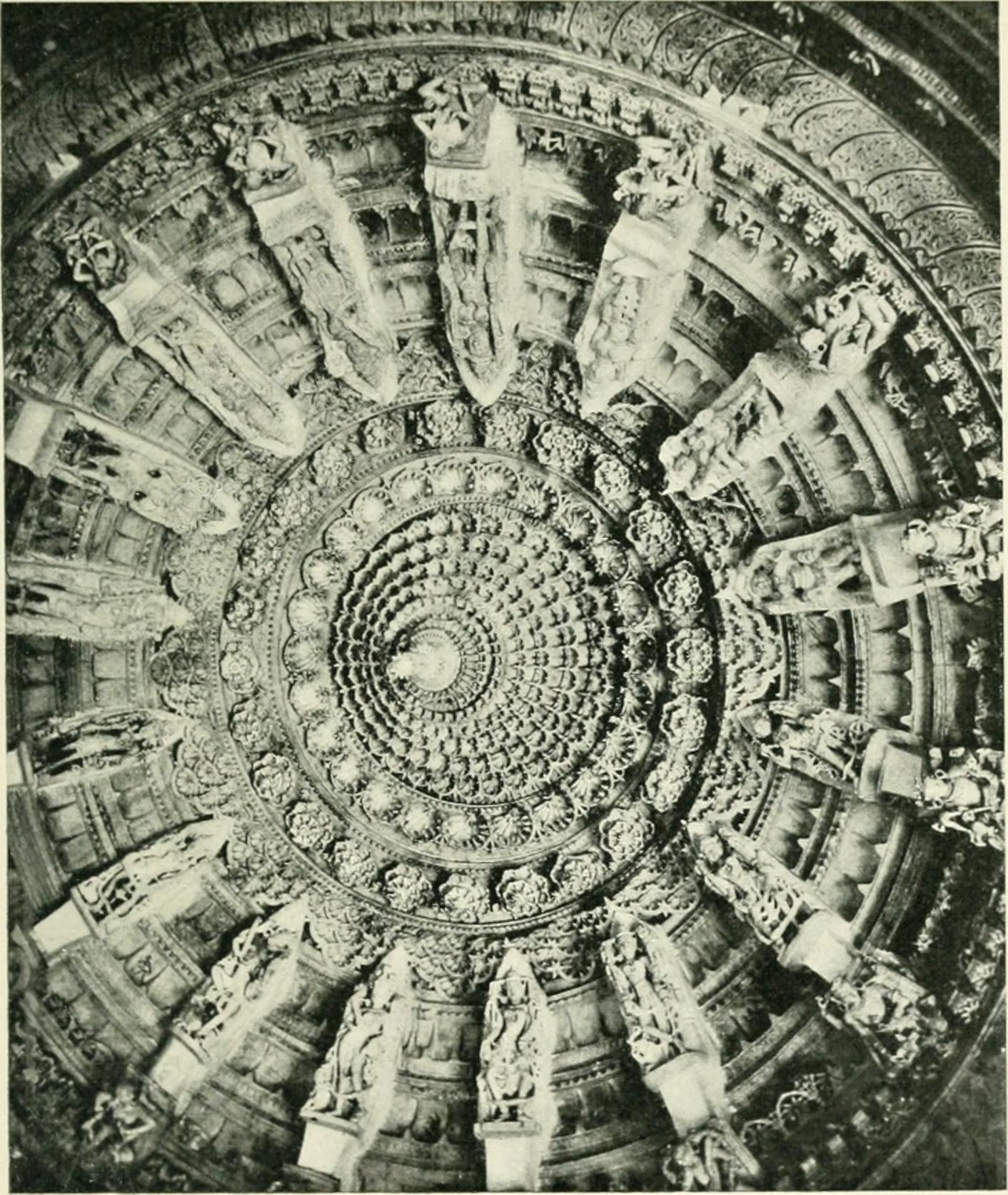
Ceiling of Dilwara Jain Temples described in Arbudadri Kalpa

Vividha Tirtha Kalpa, originally named Kalpa-pradeepa, is a widely cited Jain text composed by Jinaprabha Suri in the 14th century CE. It is a compilation of about 60 Kalpas (sections), most of them give the accounts of major Jain Tirthas.

Vividha Tirtha Kalpa is an example of the tirtha-mala texts that are compilations about Jain Tirthas throughout India.

Jinaprabh Suri is said to have written three Jain prayers in Persian.

== Author ==
Jinaprabha Suri lived during the rule of Muhammad bin Tughluq. He travelled widely and has left a record of contemporary events as well as oral traditions. He was born in Mohilvadi, Gujarat in the Tambi clan of Shrimal Jain community. He was initiated at the age of 8 and became an Acharya in Kharatara Gaccha at 23.

== Composition time ==
Some of the Kalpas contain the date of compositions, although most are undated. The dates range from Samvat 1364 to Samvat 1389. The last section of the book was written in 1332 CE in Delhi during the rule of Muhammad Bin Tuglaq.

== Contents ==
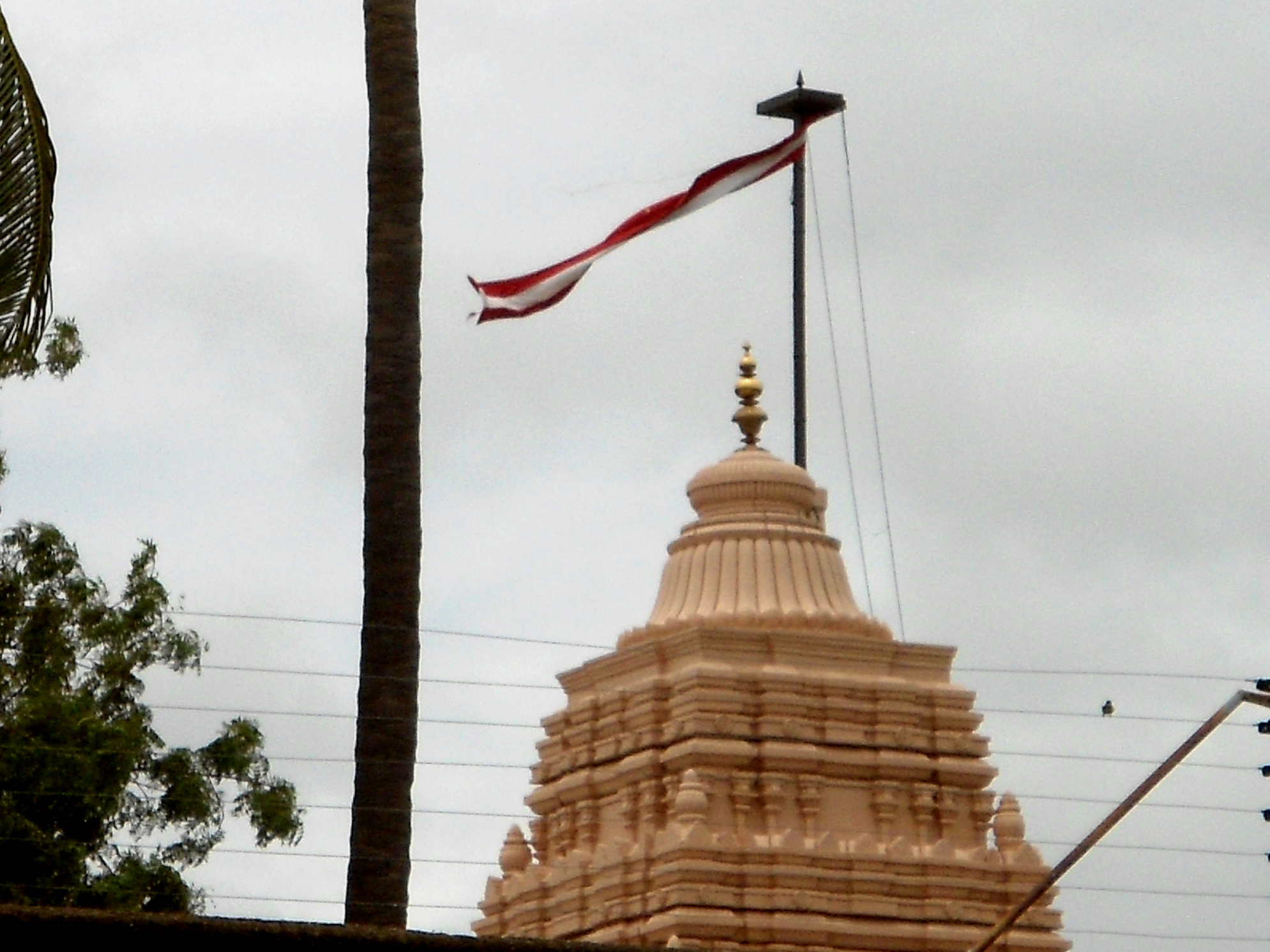
Kolanupaka Temple (Kulpakji Temple) Gopuram, Kulpak Manikyadeva Kalpa

The tirthas mentioned cover regions (as divided by Muni Jinvijay):

- Gujarat and Kathiawad
- Punjab and Uttar Pradesh
- Maharashtra
- Rajasthan and Malava
- Eastern Uttar Pradesh and Bihar
- Karnataka and Telangana

He describes the building and destruction of many temples in recent period.

== See also ==
- Tirth Pat
- Jainism in Delhi
- Shatrunjaya
