= Madhusudan Dhaky =

Architectural historian

- Born: 31 July 1927; Porbandar, Bombay Presidency, British India
- Died: 29 July 2016 (aged 88); Ahmedabad, Gujarat, India
- Occupations: Architectural and art historian

Madhusudan Amilal Dhaky (31 July 1927 – 29 July 2016) was an architectural and art historian from Gujarat, India. He had written extensively on Indian temple architecture, Jain literature and art.

== Life ==
Dhaky was born on 31 July 1927 in Porbandar, Gujarat. He completed his primary and secondary education at Porbandar. He received his surname from his native Dhank village near Porbandar. He graduated in geology and chemistry from Ferguson College, Pune. He worked with Central Bank for brief period. He had worked for three years in field of horticulture. In 1951, he established Archeology Research Group in Porbandar. He had researched Indian classical music also. He was married to Geetaben. He served as the director of research at the Centre for Art and Archaeology at the American institute of Indian Studies in Gurgaon from 1976 to 1996 and the director emeritus, research till 2005 at the same institute. He had also contributed to the construction of the modern Somnath temple.

He died on 29 July 2016 at his residence at Naranpura, Ahmedabad after brief illness.

== Works ==
He had written extensively on architectural and art history, especially Indian temple architecture. He had written 25 books, 325 research papers and 400 articles. He has written several works on Jain literature. He is known for his fourteen volume work, Indian Temple Architecture.

His books include The Embroidery and Bead work of Kutch and Saurashtra (1966), The Riddle of the Temple of Somanātha (1974), The Indian temple forms in Karṇātạ inscriptions and architecture (1987), Encyclopaedia of Indian temple architecture with Michael Meister, The Indian temple Traceries (2005), Complexities Surrounding the Vimalavasahī Temple at Mt. Abu (1980), Arhat Pārśva and Dharaṇendra nexus, Nirgranth Aitihāsik Lekh-Samuccay, Professor Nirmal Kumar Bose and His Contribution to Indian Temple Architecture: The Pratiṣṭhạ̄-Lakṣaṇasamuccaya and the Architecture of Kaliṅga (1998), The Temples in Kumbhāriyā (2001), Saptaka (1997), Shani Mekhla and Tamra Shashan (2011). The last two were fiction.

== Awards ==
He had received the Campbell Memorial Gold Medal awarded by the Asiatic Society of Bombay. He had also received Ranjitram Suvarna Chandrak in 2010. He had also received Padma Bhushan in 2010. He had also received Kumar Chandrak in 1974 and Uma Snehrashmi Prize. He was awarded lifetime achievement award by Gujarat Itihas Parishad.

== See also ==
- List of Gujarati-language writers
