= Puratana Prabandha Sangraha =

- Editor: Jinvijay
- Original title: पुरातन प्रबंध संग्रह
- Language: Sanskrit
- Subject: Collection of legendary anecdotes and biographies
- Genre: Prabandha
- Publication date: 1936
- Publication place: India

The Puratana Prabandha Sangraha ("Collection of Old Prabandhas") is a collection of Sanskrit-language legendary biographies and anecdotes written by multiple Jain authors of India. It was edited by the Jain monk Jinvijay from several manuscripts, and published by the Adhisthata Singhi Jain Jnanapith (Calcutta) in 1936.

The earliest manuscript in the compilation is dated 1290 VS (1233 CE). It is said to have been written by Jinabhadra, a disciple of Udayaprabha and a monk of Nagendra Gaccha. It was commissioned by a minister named Jayatasimha, who was the son of Vastupala.

== Prithviraja Prabandha ==
One of the legends included in the collection is Prithviraja Prabandha, which describes the life of the 12th century Chahamana king Prithviraja III. The Prithviraja Prabandha contains 40 lines of prose in addition to two 6-line verses.

Although a Puratana Prabandha Sangraha manuscript is dated 1471 CE, its portion containing Prithviraja Prabandha was written by another scribe. Therefore, Prithviraja Prabandha cannot be dated with certainty. The language of the text features Persian and vernacular elements, which indicates that it was written at a later date.

Some portions of the manuscript are damaged, and the meaning of some passes is not clear.

The text describes Prithviraj's legend as follows:

Prithivraj captured the Ghurid invader Shihab al-Din seven times, but released him unharmed each time (a claim that also occurs in the Hammira Mahakavya). Prithviraj's minister Kaimbasa and his spear-bearer Pratapasimha were not on good terms with each other. Once Kaimbasa lodged a complaint against Pratapasimha with the king. However, Pratapasimha persuaded the king that Kaimbasa was a villain who had been secretly supporting Shihab al-Din. As a result, Prithviraj attempted to kill Kaimbasa by shooting an arrow at him in the dark, but ended up killing another man instead.

The king's bard Chand Baliddika criticized him in private for this attempted murder. Prithviraj dismissed both Chand Baliddika and Kaimbasa from his service, and as a result, Kaimbasa joined Shihab al-Din. When Shihab al-Din invaded his kingdom, Prithviraj spent time sleeping for ten days. After being awaken by his sister, he fled on a horse. Kaimbasa helped Shihab al-Din capture him by divulging information about a certain sound that made his horse prance.

While in captivity, Prithviraj asked Kaimbasa for a bow-and-arrow to kill Shihab al-Din, who would be seated in the assembly hall. The minister obliged, but also informed Shihab al-Din about Prithviraj's plan. Shihab al-Din kept a metal image in his place. Prithviraj shot an arrow at this image, mistaking it to be Shihab al-Din. As a punishment, Shihab al-Din ordered him to be put in a pit and stoned to death. When the neighbouring king Jaychand received the news of Prithviraj's death, he ordered celebrations in his capital.
