= Prabandha-Chintamani =

14th century collection of biographical narratives from India

- Author: Merutunga
- Original title: प्रबन्ध चिन्तामणि
- Language: Sanskrit
- Subject: Collection of biographical legends
- Genre: prabandha
- Publication date: c. 1304 CE (1361 VS)
- Publication place: India

Prabandha-Chintamani (IAST: Prabandha-cintāmaṇi) is an Indian Sanskrit-language collection of prabandhas (semi-historical biographical narratives). It was compiled in c. 1304 CE, in the Vaghela kingdom of present-day Gujarat, by Jain scholar Merutunga.

== Contents ==
The book is divided into five prakashas (parts):

1. Prakasha I
  - Vikramarka
  - Shatavahana
  - Munja
  - Mularaja
2. Prakasha II
  - Bhoja and Bhima
3. Prakasha III
  - Jayasimha Siddharaja
4. Prakasha IV
  - Kumarapala
  - Viradhavala
  - Vastupala and Tejapala
5. Prakasha V
  - Lakshmanasena
  - Jayachandra
  - Varahamihira
  - Bhartrihari
  - Vaidya Vagabhatta

== Historical reliability ==
As a work of history, Prabandha-Chintamani is inferior to contemporary historical literature, such as the Muslim chronicles. Merutunga states that he wrote the book to "replace the oft-heared ancient stories which no longer delighted the wise". His book includes a large number of interesting anecdotes, but many of these anecdotes are fictitious.

Merutunga finished writing the book in c. 1304 CE (1361 Vikrama Samvat). However, while narrating historical incidents, he does not give much importance to contemporary period, of which he possessed direct knowledge. His book contains historical narratives from 940 CE to 1250 CE, for which he had to rely on oral tradition and earlier texts. Because of this, his book ended up becoming a collection of unreliable anecdotes.

Several contemporary or near-contemporary works of Gujarat do not mention any dates while narrating historical incidents. Merutunga perhaps realized that it was important to mention exact dates in writing history, and provides several dates in his Prabandha-Chintamani. However, most of these dates are wrong by a few months or a year. It appears that Merutunga knew years of historical incidents from the earlier records, and fabricated the exact dates to make his work more believable. The text also features instances of anachronism; for example, Varahamihira (6th century CE) is described as a contemporary of a Nanda king (4th century BCE).

Since the work was composed in Gujarat, it portrays the rulers of Gujarat positively, in comparison to the rival rulers of the neighbouring kingdom of Malwa.

== Critical editions and translations ==
In 1888, Shastri Ramachandra Dinanatha edited and published Prabandha-Chintamani. In 1901, Charles Henry Tawney translated it into English at the suggestion of Georg Bühler. Durgasankar Shastri revised Dinanatha's edition, and published it in 1932. Muni Jinvijay published another edition in 1933, and also translated the text into Hindi language.
