= Prabandha Kosha =

Prabandha-Kosha
- Author: Rajashekhara Suri
- Original title: प्रबन्धकोश
- Language: Sanskrit
- Subject: Collection of biographical legends
- Genre: prabandha
- Publication date: 1349 CE
- Publication place: India

Prabandha-Kosha (IAST: Prabandhakośa) is an Indian Sanskrit-language collection of prabandhas (legendary biographical narratives). It was compiled by the Jain scholar Rajashekhara Suri in 1349 CE. It describes the lives of 24 people, including 10 Jain scholars, 4 Sanskrit poets, 7 kings and 3 Jain householders. It is also known as Chaturvinshati Prabandha.

The content of the collection is based on the information that Rajashekhara obtained from his teacher Tilakasuri. He composed the work at Delhi, under the patronage of Madanasimha, whose father had been honoured by Shri Mahamad Shahi (probably Muhammad Tughluq).

Only the 7th prabandha in the collection (the one about Mallavadi-Suri) is written completely in verse form; the rest of the prabandhas use colloquial Sanskrit prose.

== Content ==
The Prabandha-Kosha contains 24 prabandhas (anecdotes), with 4,300 shlokas (verses), on the following persons:

=== Suris (Jain scholars) ===
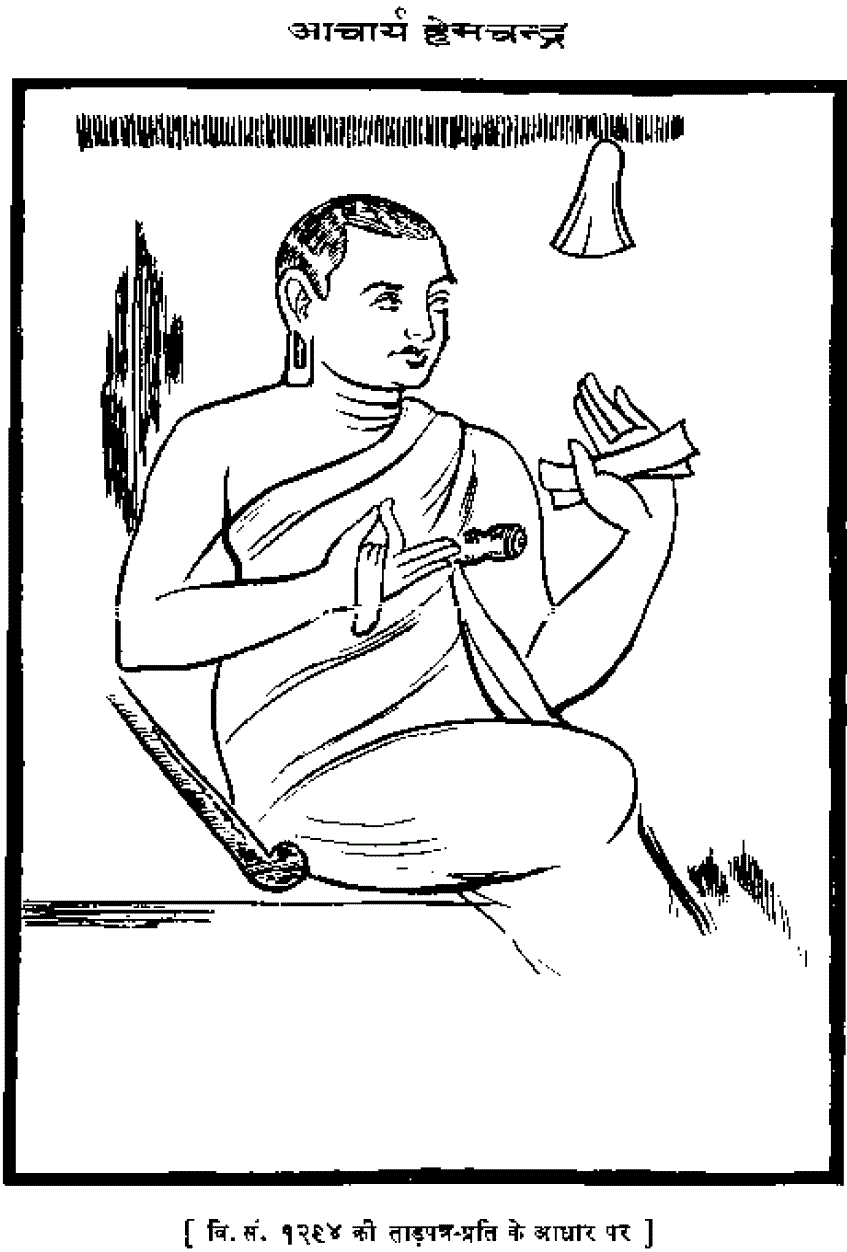
Hemachandra Suri

1. Bhadrabahu and Varaha
2. Aryanandila
3. Jivadeva-Suri
4. Aryakhapata Acharya
5. Padaliptasuri
6. Siddhasenasuri and Vriddhavadi
7. Mallavadi-Suri
8. Haribhadrasuri
9. Bappabhattisuri
10. Hemachandrasuri

=== Poets ===
1. Harsha
2. Harihara
3. Amarachandra
4. Madanakirti

=== Kings ===
1. Satavahana
2. Vankachula
3. Vikramaditya
4. Nagarjuna
5. Udayana
6. Lakshmana-Sena (or Lakshana-Sena) Kumaradeva
7. Madanavarman

=== Jain householders / courtiers ===
1. Ratna-Shravaka
2. Abhada-Shravaka
3. Vastupala and Tejapala
