= Merutunga =

Jain monk and scholar

Personal life
- Born: 14th-century
- Died: 14th-century
- Notable work(s): Prabandha-Chintamani; Vicharashreni

Religious life
- Religion: Jainism

Merutuṅga was a medieval scholar from present-day Gujarat in India and was a Śvētāmbara Jain monk of the Achal Gaccha. He is presently most well-known for his Sanskrit text, the Prabandhacintāmaṇi, composed in 1306 CE. He also wrote Vicāraśreṇī in 1350 CE which describes the chronology of Chāvḍā, Chaulukya and Vāghelā dynasties.

== Works ==
=== Prabandhacintāmaṇi ===
The Prabandhacintāmaṇi was composed in Vardhamāna (modern-day Wadhwan) in VS 1361 Phālguna Śukla 15, a Sunday. In the text itself, Merutuṅga states that Gaṇī Guṇacandra compiled the first version of the text and that Dharmadeva assisted Merutuṅga in the compilation of the final version.

=== Therāvalī ===
The Therāvalī of Merutuṅga is a Paṭṭāvalī that presents a chronology from Mahavira to the arrival of and invasion by the Sakas in India.

=== Vicāraśreṇī ===
The Vicāraśreṇī is a bhāṣya on his earlier Therāvalī and was likely composed in VS 1363 (1306 CE).

=== Ṣaḍdarśananirṇaya ===
The Ṣaḍdarśananirṇaya is a general exposition, a doxography of 6 contemporary religious philosophies (darśanas) during Merutuṅga's time: Buddhism, Nyāya, Sāṃkhya, Vaiśeṣika, Mīmāṃsā, and Jainism. It is unique among medieval Jain doxographies in that it presents refutations on non-Jain positions found in the other philosophies.

=== Mahāpuruṣacarita ===
The work has survived with a bhāṣya, likely written by Merutuṅga himself, and is a charita, a biography, of five great figures in Jainism: Ṛṣabhadeva, Neminātha, Śāntinātha, Pārśvanātha, and Mahāvīra. Additionally, in the bhāṣya, the original work is named the Upadeśaśataka and the Dharmopadeśaśataka. It is also referred to as the Vivaraṇa.
