= Military career of Bhoja =

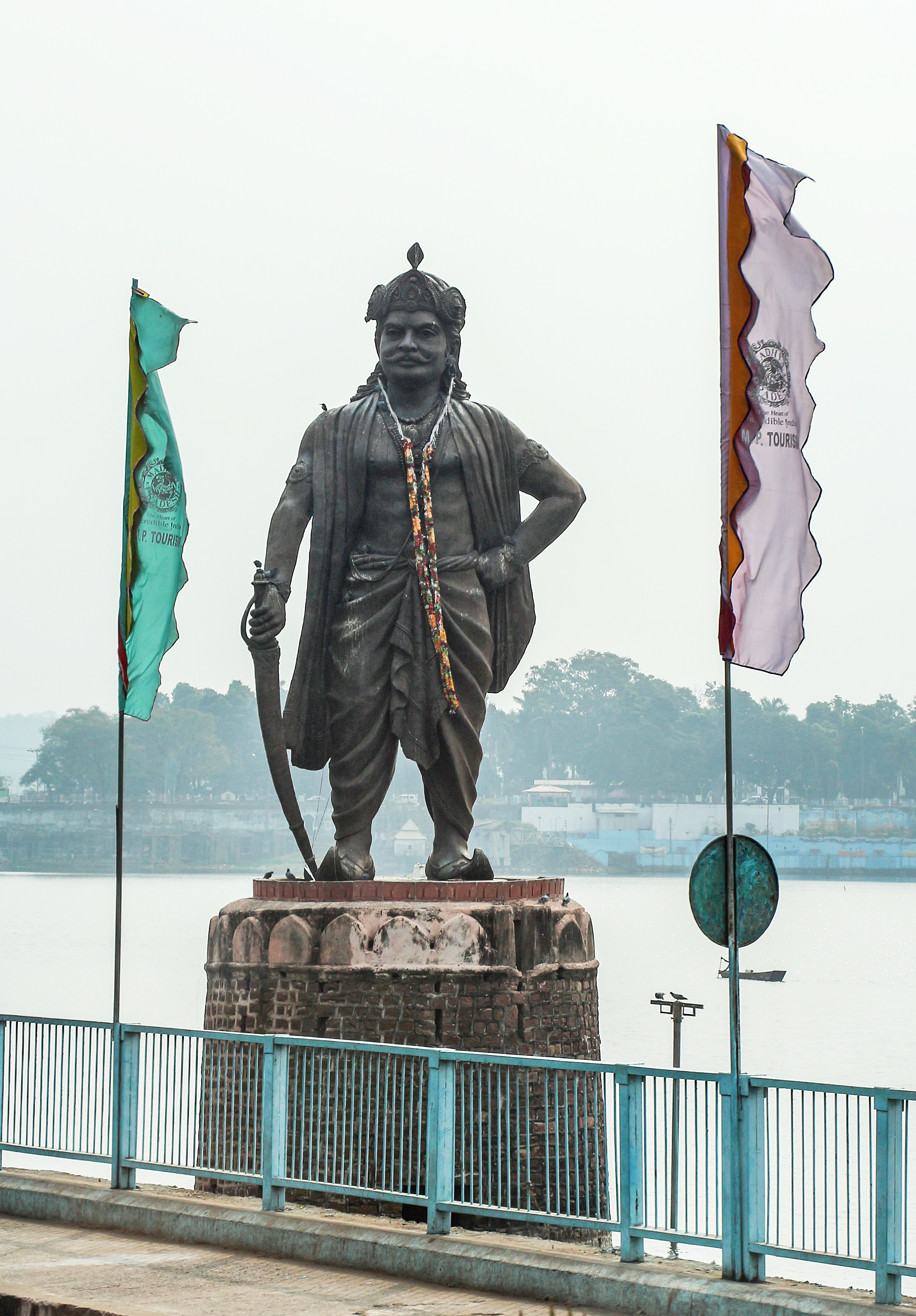
A statue of Bhoja in Bhopal

The 11th century Paramara king Bhoja ruled from his capital at Dhara (Dhar in present-day Madhya Pradesh, India). The period of his reign is dated approximately 1010 CE to 1055 CE, although some historians believe that he ascended the throne before 1010 CE. Bhoja inherited a kingdom centered around the Malwa region, and made several attempts to expand it varying results. He managed to annex territories as far as northern parts of Konkan, but these territorial gains were short-lived. He fought wars against several of his neighbours, including the Chaulukyas of Gujarat, the Chalukyas of Lata, the Chalukyas of Kalyani (Western Chalukyas), the Chandelas of Jejakabhukti, the Kachchhapaghatas of Gwalior, the Chahamanas of Shakambhari, the Chahamanas of Naddula, and the Kalachuris of Tripuri. He also conflicted with Gaznavid Turk Invaders, Mahmud's desecration of the Somnath temple in Gujarat motivated Bhoja to lead an army against him, however after Somnath raid, Mahmud Gazhnavi chose a more dangerous route via Sindh, to avoid facing the invading powerful armies of Bhoja.

Apart from epigraphic records, much of the information about Bhoja's military campaigns comes from legendary accounts, including Hemachandra (12th century), Merutunga's Prabandha-Chintamani (14th century), Rajavallabha's Bhoja-Charitra (15th century), and Ballala's Bhoja-Prabandha (17th century).

== Chaulukyas: Vallabha and Durlabha ==
The kingdom of the Chaulukyas of Gujarat (also known as Chaulukyas) was located to the west of Malwa, the Paramara territory. Several legendary accounts talk of a rivalry between the two kingdoms during the reigns of the Chaulukya rulers Vallabha and Durlabha. Some historians, who date the start of Bhoja's reign before 1010 CE, believe that this conflict happened during the early years of his reign.

According to the 12th century writer Hemachandra, who was patronized by the Chaulukyas, Bhoja's predecessor Sindhuraja invaded the Chaulukya kingdom, but was forced to retreat by Chamunda-raja. Abhayatilaka's commentary on Hemachandra's work states that Chamunda later retired and set on a pilgrimate to Kashi. On the way, he passed through Malwa, whose king forced him to give up his royal insignia. According to Hemachandra, Chamunda returned to the Chaulukya capital Anahilavada, and asked his son and successor Vallabha-raja to avenge his humiliation. Vallabha set out against Bhoja with an army, but died of smallpox on the way. His army then retreated to his Anahilavada.

The 14th century writer Merutunga claims that it was Vallabha's successor Durlabha-raja who passed through Malwa on his way to Kashi, and Munja was the Paramara king at the time. However, this account is historically inaccurate, because Munja died nearly a decade before Durlabha's ascension. Sukrita Sankirtana by Arisimha and Sukrita-Kirti-Kallolini by Udayaprabha Suri, both written under the patronage of Chaulukyas and their successors, claim that Vallabha defeated the king of Malwa. These claims are not supported by any historical evidence either. Only the fact that Vallabha marched against Malwa appears to be historically true, as suggested by the Vadnagar Prashasti inscription of the later Chaulukya king Kumarapala. This inscription claims that the king of Malwa felt a quake on hearing about Vallabharaja's march against him.

Durlabha became the Chaulukya king around 1009 CE, so Vallabha's invasion of Malwa must have happened before this time. Some scholars, such as D. C. Ganguly and K. N. Seth identify Vallabha's rival as Bhoja, who according to them, had just assumed the throne of Malwa around 1008 CE. Other scholars, such as Mahesh Singh, believe that Bhoja's ascension took place after 1009 CE, and therefore Vallabha's rival must have been Bhoja's predecessor Sindhuraja.

According to a legend mentioned by Hemachandra, Vallabha's successor Durlabha also fought against the ruler of Malwa. According to this account, Mahendra-raja, the Chahamana ruler of Nadol, organized a swayamvara (husband-choosing ceremony) for his sister Durlabha-devi. Besides Durlabha-raja, he invited the rulers of Anga, Andhra, Kashi, Kuru, Mathura and Ujjayini to this ceremony. Durlabha-devi chose Durlabha-raja as her husband. Out of jealousy, the other invitees formed a confederacy and attacked his contingent, while he was returning to his capital. Durlabha-raja defeated their combined army. The contemporary ruler of Ujjayini (which is located in Malwa) would have been Bhoja. The king was young at the time, so his participation in a swayamvara does not sound far-fetched. However, Durlabha's defeat of such a strong confederacy seems unlikely, and there is no historical evidence of a war between Bhoja and Durlabha. Moreover, the chief of Naddula was a relatively insignificant ruler, and it is unlikely that so many major rulers left their kingdoms to attend his ceremony at a time when northern India was under attacks from Mahmud of Ghazni. Therefore, this legend does not seem to be historically accurate.

== Chalukyas of Lata ==
Bhoja's first military aggression appears to be his invasion of the Lata region (in present-day Gujarat), around 1018 CE. Durlabha, the Chaulukya (Chalukya) king of Gujarat, had plundered Lata in 1018 CE. Soon after this, Bhoja also invaded Lata. Bhoja's victory over the ruler of Lata is attested by epigraphic records, as well as literary and epigraphic records, including the Prabandha-Chintamani, the Udaipur Prashasti inscription and the Kalyan copper plate inscription.

The ruler defeated by Bhoja appears to be Kirtiraja, who belonged to a Chalukya branch, and whose Surat grant is dated 1018 CE. A copper-plate grant of his grandson Trilochana-pala seems to corroborate Bhoja's victory, when it states that Kirtiraja's fame was taken away briefly by his enemies. According to K M Munshi, Kirtiraja was the vassal of the Western Chalukyas, but K N Seth believes that he was an independent ruler at the time of Bhoja's invasion.

Bhoja did not depose the Chalukyas of Lata: the epigraphic evidence suggests that the dynasty continued even after this defeat. Kirtiraja may have become independent after serving as a feudatory of Bhoja for a brief period.

== Shilaharas of Konkana ==
Bhoja's invasion of Lata brought him close to the Shilahara kingdom of northern Konkana, which was located to the south of Lata. By this time, the Shilaharas had been weakened by a Western Chalukya invasion, and probably acknowledged their suzerainty.

In 1017 CE, the Shilahara king Arikesari was independent of Bhoja, as suggested by his 1017 CE inscription discovered at Thane. The Betma copper-plate inscription of Bhoja, dated 3 January 1020 CE, indicates that northern Konkana was under the Paramara control by this date. Therefore, Bhoja must have invaded Konkan sometime during 1017-1020 CE. Bhoja's conquest of Konkana was a first for a Paramara king in this region. He celebrated this victory in a big way by making generous donations to Brahmins. His 1020 CE inscription states that he organized a Konkana-Grahana Vijaya Parva ("Konkan Victory Festival").

The Shilaharas probably continued to administer Konkana as Bhoja's vassals. By the end of his reign, Bhoja had lost the control of this territory. According to D. B. Diskalkar, the Western Chalukya king Jayasimha II conquered this region from Bhoja. The 1024 CE Miraj inscription of Jayasimha states that after subduing the lords of "the seven Konkanas", he encamped near Kolhapur in order to conquer the northern regions. Diskalkar believed that the term "northern regions" here refers to northern Konkana, which Jayasimha must have captured some time before 1024 CE. The critics of this theory point out that the Miraj inscription only refers to a plan, not the actual conquest of the northern regions. Moreover, none of the Chalukya inscriptions refer to their victory over the Paramaras in Konkana, although they mention their other successes against Bhoja. According to P. V. Kane, the lords defeated by Jayasimha were the Kadambas of Goa. K. N. Seth believes that it was Jayasimha's successor Someshvara I, who evicted the Paramaras from northern Konkana, around 1047 CE.

== Chalukyas of Kalyani: Jayasimha II ==
The Chalukyas of Kalyani, also known as the Western Chalukyas, were the southern neighbours and bitter rivals of the Paramaras. Their king Tailapa II had defeated and killed Bhoja's uncle Munja. Sometime before 1019 CE, Bhoja formed an alliance against them with Rajendra Chola and Gangeyadeva Kalachuri. At this time, Jayasimha II was the Chalukya king. The triple alliance engaged the Chalukyas at their northern and southern frontiers simultaneously. The extent of Bhoja's success in this campaign is not certain, as both Chalukya and Paramara panegyrics claimed victory.

The Chalukya inscriptions state that they forced Bhoja's army to retreat. The 1019 CE Balligavi inscription of his feudatory states that Jayasimha was like a moon to the lotus Bhoja (that is, Jayasimha humbled Bhoja like a moon-rise causes a day-blooming lotus to close its petals). It claims that Jayasimha forced the Malwa army to flee the battlefield. Jayasimha's 1028 CE Kulenur inscription claims that he routed the elephant army of (Rajendra) Chola, Gangeya and Bhoja. In this battle, Jayasimha's vassal Bachiraja seems to have played an important role: he claims to have embarrassed Bhoja. On the other hand, the Kalvan copper plates of Bhoja's feudatory Yashovarman as well as the Udaipur Prashasti inscription of Bhoja's descendants claim that he defeated the Karnatas (that is, the Chalukyas of Kalyani).

D. C. Ganguly believes that Bhoja achieved some early victories against the Chalukyas, but was ultimately defeated. Others, including D. B. Diskalkar and H. C. Ray, believe that Bhoja was defeated by Jayasimha after some early successes, but ultimately emerged victorious against the Chalukyas after 1028 CE. According to Georg Bühler, the struggle probably ended with some advantage for Bhoja, which might have been exaggerated into a great victory by the Paramara poets.

Swati Datta notes that the 1022 CE Depalpur inscription of Bhoja records the grant of a village to a Brahmin named Vacchala. The record states that Vacchala had migrated from Manyakheta (which was in Jayasimha's territory) to Malwa. Datta theorizes that by this time, Jayasimha's kingdom was under attack from the Chola-Kalachuri-Paramara confederacy. The Cholas had previously attacked the Chalukya kingdom during the reign of Jayasimha's ancestor Satyashraya. During this invasion, they are said to have killed the Brahmin men and married off Brahmin girls to the men from other castes. According to Datta, Vacchala might have feared a repeat of this episode in case of a Chalukya defeat. This might have motivated him to seek shelter with Bhoja, who was reputed as a patron of learned Brahmins. Datta believes that Jayasimha was able to repulse the invasion by 1024 CE.

A Bhoja-Charitra legend claims that shortly after becoming the king, Bhoja saw a play which depicted the killing of his uncle Munja by Tailapa. An enraged Bhoja launched an expedition against Tailapa, captured him, humiliated him and finally executed him. The story is historically inaccurate, as Tailapa died before Bhoja ascended the throne.

== Indraratha ==
The Udaipur Prashasti states that Bhoja defeated a ruler named Indraratha. A king with the same name is also mentioned in Rajendra Chola's 1018 CE Thiruvalangadu and 1025 CE Tirumalai inscriptions. According to the Chola inscriptions, Indraratha belonged to the Somavamshi dynasty, and was defeated at Adinagara. The defeated king is identified with Indranatha of the Somavamshi dynasty of Kalinga, and Adinagara is identified with present-day Mukhalingam. Historians believe that the king defeated by Bhoja and Rajendra Chola was the same person. There is no evidence of Bhoja having led an independent campaign against Indraratha: he may have played a secondary role in the Chola campaign as part of an alliance.

== Ghaznavids ==
The Ghaznavids, a Muslim dynasty of Turkic origin, invaded north-western India in the 11th century, led by Mahmud of Ghazni. The Udaipur Prashasti claims that Bhoja's mercenaries defeated the Turushkas (Turkic people). There are some legendary accounts of Bhoja's military successes against the foreign invaders identified with the Ghaznavids. However, there is no clear evidence to show that Bhoja fought against the Ghaznavids or any other Muslim army. Nevertheless, the legends suggest that Bhoja was not a silent spectator to the Ghaznavid campaigns in north-western India. The invaders did not reach Malwa during Bhoja's reign. So if Bhoja's soldiers did fight against them, the battle would have happened outside Malwa.

According to the 16th century Muslim historian Firishta, Mahmud of Ghazni invaded the Hindu Kabul Shahi kingdom in 1008 CE. Its ruler Anandapala requested help from other Hindu kings. In response, the kings of Ajmer, Delhi, Gwalior, Kalinjar, Kannauj and Ujjain formed a confederacy with Anandapala. Mahmud defeated this coalition army. However, none of the earlier Muslim historians mention the contribution of other Hindu kings to Anandapala's defence, and therefore modern historians consider Firishta's claim as an exaggeration. It is, however, possible that some of these kings supplied troops to Anandapala. Since Ujjain is in Malwa, the king of Ujjain referred by Firishta could have been Bhoja. Some years later, Anandapala's son Trilochanapala was also defeated by Mahmud, and is said to have been granted asylum by Bhoja.

Mahmud attacked the Somnath Hindu temple around 1024 CE. Kitab Zainu'l-Akhbar (c. 1048 CE) by 'Abd al-Hayy Gardizi states that after the Somnath raid, Mahmud chose to avoid a confrontation with a powerful Hindu ruler called Param Dev. Mahmud was carrying back a large amount of looted wealth, which might have been his motivation behind avoiding a battle. He did not return to Multan via the same route he had arrived. Instead, he chose a more dangerous route via Sindh, to avoid facing Param Dev: he passed through a desert, where the scarcity of food and water killed a large number of his soldiers and animals. The 16th century Tabaqat-i-Akbari by Nizamuddin Ahmad and Firishta's writings also mention this incident. Firishta identified Param Dev with Bhima I, the Chaulukya king of Gujarat. However, this identification is contested by modern historians. Bhima had ascended the throne relatively recently, and was not a powerful ruler at the time of Mahmud's raid. In fact, according to Muslim historians, during Mahmud's invasion, he fled his capital Anahilavada and took shelter in Kandahat (identified with Kanthkot). Moreover, Mahmud defeated the Chaulukya army in January 1025 CE. The Muslim historians before Firishta, such as Gardizi and Nizamuddin Ahmad, mention the king of Naharawala (Anhailavada) as distinct from Param Dev. Unlike Bhima, Bhoja was a powerful and famous ruler at that time. Bhoja was also a Shaivite, and according to the Udaipur Prashasti, had constructed a temple dedicated to Somnath (an aspect of Shiva). Thus Mahmud's desecration of the Somnath temple in Gujarat would have motivated Bhoja to lead an army against him. Based on these evidences, modern scholars identify Param Dev with Bhoja. According to this theory, Param Dev may be a corruption of Paramara-Deva or of Bhoja's title Parameshvara-Paramabhattakara.

Firishta also states that in 1043 CE, the Raja of Delhi formed an alliance with other Hindu kings to re-capture the territories lost to Mahmud of Ghazni. The allies expelled Mahmud's governors from Hansi, Thanesar and their dependencies. After a 4-month long siege they also took control of Nagarkot. Next, they unsuccessfully besieged Lahore for 7 months. The Raja of Delhi is identified with Tomar ruler Mahipal, but it is unclear who his allies were. Based on the Udaipur Prashasti's claim of Bhoja's successes against the Turushkas, historians such as K. N. Seth and S. N. Sen suggest that Bhoja was a member of this confederacy.

A Bhavishya Purana legend also narrates Bhoja's campaign against the Muslims, describing him a descendant of the legendary kings Vikramaditya and Shalivahana. It states that Bhoja defeated several mleccha (foreign) kings after reaching the Indus River. During this campaign, he came into contact with a mleccha named Mahamada (a character modeled on Muhammad, possibly combined with Mahmud of Ghazni). Lord Shiva told Bhoja that Mahamada had been doing the work of the pishachas (demons). The poet Kalidasa, who accompanied Bhoja, turned Mahamada into ash with his chants and prayers. Mahamada's disciples took the ashes, and returned to the Vahika country, where they established the Mada-hina city (literally, "without intoxication"; identified with Medina). One night, Mahamada magically took on a pishacha body and appeared before Bhoja. He told Bhoja that the pishachas will practice ritual circumcision, keep beards but not topknots (unlike Hindus), and eat cows. He further said that they will use a musala (pestle) for their rites, thus explaining the etymology of the term "Muslim". Bhoja came home and established Sanskrit language among the top three varnas and Prakrit language among the Shudras. During his 50-year reign, Aryavarta (the land between the Himalayas and the Vindhyas) became a blessed land where the varna system was established. On the other hand, caste mixture took place beyond the Vindhyas (that is, in South India). This is an imaginary account not supported by any historical evidence.

== Chandelas and Kachchhapaghatas ==
The Chandelas of Jejakabhukti were the eastern neighbours of the Paramaras. The Mahoba inscription of the Chandelas claims that Bhoja and "Kalachuri Chandra" (Gangeya-deva) waited upon the Chandela king Vidyadhara, who had "caused the destruction of the king of Kanyakubja" (that is, the Gurjara-Pratihara king Rajyapala). According to one theory, this suggests that Bhoja, possibly aided by Gangeya-deva, unsuccessfully invaded Vidyadhara's territory. However, some scholars such as K. M. Munshi believe that the statement in the Mahoba inscription is merely a boastful exaggeration. Historian V. V. Mirashi interpreted it to mean that Bhoja participated as an ally in Vidyadhara's campaign against Rajyapala.

Bhoja was able to extend his influence among the Chandela feudatories, possibly after Vidyadhara's death. The Kachchhapaghatas of Dubkund were the northern neighbours of the Paramaras. During Arjuna's reign, they were Chandela vassals. However, Arjuna's successor Abhimanyu accepted Bhoja's suzerainty. The 1088 CE Dubkund inscription of Abhimanyu's grandson Vikramasimha states that the intelligent and illustrious king Bhoja-deva praised Abhimanyu's skills as a general.

The 1092 CE Sasbahu Temple inscription of the Kachchhapaghata ruler Mahipala states that his ancestor Kirtiraja defeated the prince of Malava, whose soldiers fled the battlefield, leaving behind their spears. Earlier scholars identified the defeated king as Bhoja, but it is more likely that this king was his predecessor Sindhuraja.

== Gurjaras ==
According to the Udaipur Prashasti inscription, Bhoja defeated the Gurjara king. The identity of this king is debated by the historians. D. C. Ganguly identified him with a Rashtrakuta of Kannauj. However, no Rashtrakuta king is known to have been referred to as a "Gurjara". According to K. N. Seth, the Gurjara king can be identified with the Gurjara-Pratihara ruler Trilochanapala of Kannauj (whose last known inscription is dated 1027 CE).

The Gurjara-Pratihara capital was located at Kanyakubja (Kannauj). After their decline, the area around Kanyakubja was controlled by the Kalachuris and the Gahadavalas. The 1104 CE Basahi inscription of the Gahadavalas states that their king Chandradeva emerged as the saviour of the land after the death of Bhoja and the destruction of Karna's fame. Since the Gurjara-Pratihara king Mihira Bhoja had died more than two centuries earlier, "Bhoja" here must refer to the Paramara king. This corroborates the theory that Bhoja's influence extended to Kanyakubja.

In any case, historical evidence indicates that Bhoja could not retain control of Kannauj for a long time, if at all. In his campaign against the Gurjaras, Bhoja may have been aided by Satyaraja, a Paramara of the Vagada branch. The Panhera inscription of Satyaraja states that he defeated the Gurjaras, and received a fortune from Bhoja.

== Sahavahana ==
The 1046 CE Tilakawada copper plate inscription states that Bhoja's general Suraditya stabilized his royal fortune by slaughtering one Sahavahana in a battle.

Earlier scholars, including D. C. Ganguly and K. M. Munshi, identified Sahavahana with Sahila Verman of Chamba's Mushana dynasty. This identification is not correct, as Sahila Verman's reign ended in the mid-10th century, much before Bhoja's ascension. Another theory identifies Sahavahana with Salavahana, a descendant of Sahila Verman. However, it is unlikely that the small hill state of Chamba could gather an army formidable enough to destabilize Bhoja's kingdom, located nearly 1,500 km away from Chamba.

D. B. Diskalkar believed "Sahavahana" to be a variant of "Chahamana", and identified the defeated king as a Nadol Chahamana ruler. H. V. Trivedi disagreed with this theory, arguing that there is no philological connection between the two words. He theorized that "Sahavahana" is a variant of Satavahana, and may have been used as a generic term for the southern kingdoms (possibly the Western Chalukyas in this case).

According to K. N. Seth, Sahavahana might not have been a king at all, as the inscription does not mention his title. He might have been a general of one of Bhoja's rivals, possibly the Kalachuri king Karna.

== Chahamanas ==
The various branches of the Chahamanas occupied territories to the north of Bhoja's kingdom. Later texts such as Surjana-Charita, Hammira-Kavya and Prabandha Kosha claim that the Shakambhari Chahamana king Vakpati II defeated Bhoja. These sources provide also provide some fictitious details about the supposed conflict. However, this claim is not reliable. According to the Prithviraja Vijaya, Bhoja defeated and killed Vakpati's successor Viryarama. If Vakpati had indeed defeated Bhoja, Bhoja's campaign against Viryarama may have been aimed at avenging this defeat.

Encouraged by this success, he also waged a war against the Chahamanas of Naddula (Nadol). But in this second campaign, his army was forced to retreat, and his general Sadha was killed in a battle against Anahilla.

== Chalukyas of Kalyani: Someshvara I ==
During the last years of Bhoja's reign, Jayasimha's son and successor Someshvara I invaded Malwa, and sacked his capital Dhara. S. N. Sen dates this invasion to some time after 1042 CE.

Multiple Chalukya inscriptions dated between 1058 and 1067 CE state that Someshvara invaded Malwa, and plundered its important cities, including Dhara, Ujjayni and Mandapa. Vikramankadeva-Charita by Bilhana, a court-poet of Someshvara's son Vikramaditya VI, states that Bhoja deserted his capital Dhara, which was then sacked by Someshvara. Kuvalayananda of the 16th century philosopher Appayya Dikshita also appears to refer to this attack on Malwa by Kuntaleshvara ("Lord of Kuntala", presumably Someshvara I).

Someshvara's generals in this expedition included Gundamaya, Jomarasa, Madhusudana (Madhuva) and Nagadeva. The 1058 CE Nagai inscription of Madhusudana states that the Chalukya king burned Dhara and Ujjayini. It credits Madhusudana with forcing the ruler of Dhara to flee the city. A 1059-1060 CE states that Nagadeva was like "a garuda to the serpent Bhoja". A 1060 CE inscription names Gundamaya as the general who captured the Mandapa fort. The 1067 CE Hottur inscription of Jomarasa describes him as "a flame of doom to Bhoja".

K. A. Nilakantha Sastri speculated that Bhoja might have become a Chalukya vassal as a result of this invasion. But this is not supported by historical evidence: Bhoja re-established his control over Malwa soon after the departure of the Chalukya army. Nevertheless, the defeat was a major setback for the Paramaras. It pushed back the southern boundary of the Paramara kingdom from Godavari to Narmada.

== Kalachuris of Tripuri: Gangeya ==
The Kalvan inscription, the Udaipur Prashasti and Merutunga's Prabandha-Chintamani state that Bhoja defeated the ruler of Chedi. These sources do not name the defeated king, but at that time, the Chedi region was ruled by the Kalachuris of Tripuri. The contemporary Kalachuri king was Gangeya-deva. Parijata-Manjari (c. 1213 CE) by Bala Saraswati Madana specifically identifies the defeated ruler as Gangeya. A verse engraved on a stone slab in Bhoj Shala also suggests that Bhoja defeated Gangeya of Tripuri. The 1223 CE Dhar inscription of the Bhoja's descendant Arjunavarman also mentions Bhoja's victory over Gangeya.

Bhoja and Gangeya were once part of an alliance against the Chalukyas of Kalyani. It is not certain when they turned into enemies. According to one theory, Bhoja defeated Gangeya before his Chalukya campaign, in which Gangeya must have fought as a Paramara vassal. V. V. Mirashi believed that Bhoja may have subjugated Gangeya before 1019 CE. This is based on his reading of the 1019 CE Mukundpur inscription of Gangeya, in which the Kalachuri king is titled as Maharha-Maha-Mahattaka. According to Mirashi, this title is not as high as that of the traditional Maharajadhiraja, and therefore, it appears that Gangeya was a vassal of another king (Bhoja) by this time.

A contradictory theory is that the two turned enemies after their Chalukya campaign. Based on an inscription found at Mahoba, K. M. Munshi theorized that the two remained allies at least until 1025 CE. Based on the 1028 Kulenur inscription, K. N. Seth and Mahesh Singh believe that the Chalukyas and the Paramaras did not fight between 1028 CE and 1042 CE (after which Someshvara attacked Malwa). They believe that Bhoja may have used this time to launch an expedition against Gangeya.

The Hindi-language aphorism "Kahaan Raja Bhoj, kahan Gangu Teli" ("where is King Bhoj, where is Gangu Teli") contrasts something very important with something very inconsequential. According to K. N. Seth, the term "Gangu Teli" may have derived from Bhoja's victory over Gangeya ("Gangu") and the ruler of Telangana ("Teli").

The Udaipur Prashasti also claims that Bhoja defeated one Togglala. S. K. Bose identifies this person with Gangeya's predecessor Kokalla II.

== Last days ==
=== Chaulukyas: Bhima ===
According to Merutunga, the Chaulukya king Durlabha's son Bhima I had cordial relations with Bhoja during the early part of his reign. Bhoja, however, decided to expand his kingdom by capturing Bhima's territories in Gujarat. When Bhima learned of the planned invasion, he sent his diplomat Damara to Bhoja's court. A play poking fun at other kings was being staged at Bhoja's court at the time. In one scene, the Kalyani Chalukya king Tailapa and another king were shown in Paramara prison. The other king asked Tailapa to move to another corner in the prison, but Tailapa refused to vacate his place, calling it his ancestral residence. At the end of this scene, Bhoja sought Damara opinion on the script, expecting him to praise the witty humour. Damara replied that the scene was indeed witty, but reminded Bhoja that Tailapa was still renowned for killing his uncle Munja. Bhoja then abandoned his plans to attack Gujarat, and instead launched a campaign against Tilanga (ruled by the Chalukyas of Kalyani).

Bhima launched an expedition against the Paramara branch at Abu, some time before 1031 CE. Dhandhuka, the ruler of Abu, had to seek shelter with Bhoja as a result. Bhima installed Vimala of the Pragvata family as his governor in Abu. The shrine of Adinatha in Abu was commissioned by Vimala in 1031 CE, so Bhima must have defeated Dhandhuka before this year. According to Jinaprabha Suri's Tirtha Kalpa, Bhima later restored Dhandhuka as his vassal.

Hemachandra states that Bhima was once engaged in a campaign at the Sindh frontier. Taking advantage of his absence, Bhoja's general Kulachandra sacked the Chaulukya capital Anahillalpataka (Anahilavada). After his return from Sindh, Bhima dispatched his soldiers to raid Malwa several times. Merutunga's Prabandha-Chintamani states that once two such soldiers - Aluya and Akoluya - attacked Bhoja in the vicinity of his capital Dhara, but the Paramara king escaped unhurt.

=== Kalachuris of Tripuri: Karna ===
Karna, the Kalachuri king of Tripuri and the successor of Gangeya, attacked the Paramara kingdom during the last years of Bhoja's reign, or after his death. According to a legend mentioned by Merutunga, Karna challenged Bhoja to either a war or a palace-building contest. Bhoja, who was an old man by this time, chose the second option. The contest involved construction of a palace of pre-determined height in the shortest time possible. Karna managed to build his palace in Kashi, while Bhoja's palace in Ujjain remained incomplete. The loser of the contest was supposed to accept the victor's suzerainty, but Bhoja went back on his words. Therefore, Karna, in alliance with Bhima of Gujarat, invaded Malwa. According to Merutunga, Bhoja died of a disease at the same time the allied army attacked his kingdom.

=== Alliance of Bhima and Karna ===
The historicity of Merutunga's legend is doubtful, but it might have some historical basis. The Nagpur inscription of Bhoja's grandson Udayaditya mentions that he removed the "clouds of difficulties" which had spread over the Paramara capital Dhara after Bhoja's death. It appears that the alliance of Bhima and Karna attacked Malwa shortly before Bhoja died or after his death.

The Vadnagar Prashasti inscription of the Bhima's descendant Kumarapala states that Bhima captured the Paramara capital Dhara. Bhima's victory of Bhoja is also mentioned in several literary works written under Chaulukya patronage, such as Kirti-Kaumudi by Someshvara, Sukrita Sankirtana by Arisimha and Kumarapala-Charita by Jayasimha. Kirti-Kaumudi claims that Bhima captured Bhoja, but generously released him and spared his life. The legends in these literary works cannot be taken literally, as they are not corroborated by historical evidence.

Some historians, such as R. D. Banerji and H. C. Raychaudhuri, proposed that Bhoja died while facing a defeat at the hands of the enemy confederacy. According to Raychaudhuri, besides Karna and Bhima, the confederacy may have included Someshvara (Chalukya of Kalyani) and Trilochanapala (Chalukya of Lata). However, other historians believe that the Karna-led invasion of Dhara happened after Bhoja's death.

== See also ==
- Bhoja
- Paramara dynasty
- History of Madhya Pradesh
- List of rulers of Malwa
- List of Rajput dynasties and states
