= Chamundaraja =

Chamundaraja may refer to these kings of medieval India:

- Chamundaraja (Chahamana dynasty)
- Chamundaraja (Chaulukya dynasty)

== See also ==
- Chamunda, a Hindu goddess
- Chavundaraya, a ruler in medieval south India
