= Mularaja =

King of Gujarat from 941 to 996

King of Gujarat
- Reign: c. 941 – c. 996
- Predecessor: Sāmantasiṁha (Chavda dynasty)
- Successor: Chamundaraja
- Dynasty: Chaulukya

Mularaja (r. 941–996) was the king of Gujarat from 941 to 996 and the founder of the Chaulukya dynasty. Also known as the Chaulukyas of Gujarat or Solanki, this dynasty ruled parts of present-day Gujarat. Mularaja supplanted the last Chavda king, and founded an independent kingdom with his capital in Anahilapataka in 940–941.

== Ancestry ==
The Kumarapala-Bhupala-Charita of Jayasimha Suri provides a legendary genealogy of Mularaja. It states that the mythical progenitor of the Chaulukya dynasty was Chulukya, a great warrior. He established his capital at Madhupadma, and the dynasty came to be known as the Chaulukyas after him. His successors included several kings including Simha-Vikrama and Hari-Vikrama. After 85 descendants of Hari-Vikrama came Rama. Bhata or Sahajarama, the son of Rama, defeated the Shakas. Bhata's son Dadakka defeated the Gaja kings of Pipasa. Dadakka's kingdom occupied by Kanchikavyala, who was succeeded by the king Raji. Mularaja was the son of Raji and his queen Liladevi.

The Vadasma (Varunasarmaka) grant inscription of Mularaja's son Chamundaraja states that Mularaja was a descendant of one Vyalakanchi-Prabhu. This Vyalakanchi is probably same as the Kanchikavyala mentioned by Jayasimha Suri. Based on this, historian Asoke Majumdar believes that Suri's legendary account seems to be at least partially accurate: Rama and his successors appear to be historical figures. It is possible that they were small princes of a place called Madhupadma. V. V. Mirashi speculated that this place might have been situated on the banks of the river Madhuveni (present-day Mahuwar), which is a tributary of Betwa. Majumdar, on the other hand, identifies it with modern Mathura.

The 14th century chronicler Merutunga states that Mularaja was so named, because he was born under the auspices of the Mula nakshatra. According to this legend, Raji (or Raja), Bija and Dandaka (or Dadakka) were three brothers. Raji's knowledge of horse-riding greatly impressed Samanta-simha, the Chapotkata (Chavda) king of Anahilapataka. He became a close friend of the king, and married Liladevi, the king's sister. Liladevi died while she was pregnant; her womb was cut open and the infant Mularaja was taken out.

Three other chroniclers — Arisimha, Udayaprabha and Krishnaji — also describe Mularaja as the son of sister of the last Chapotkata ruler.

== Ascension ==
Find spots of inscriptions issued during the reign of Mularaja

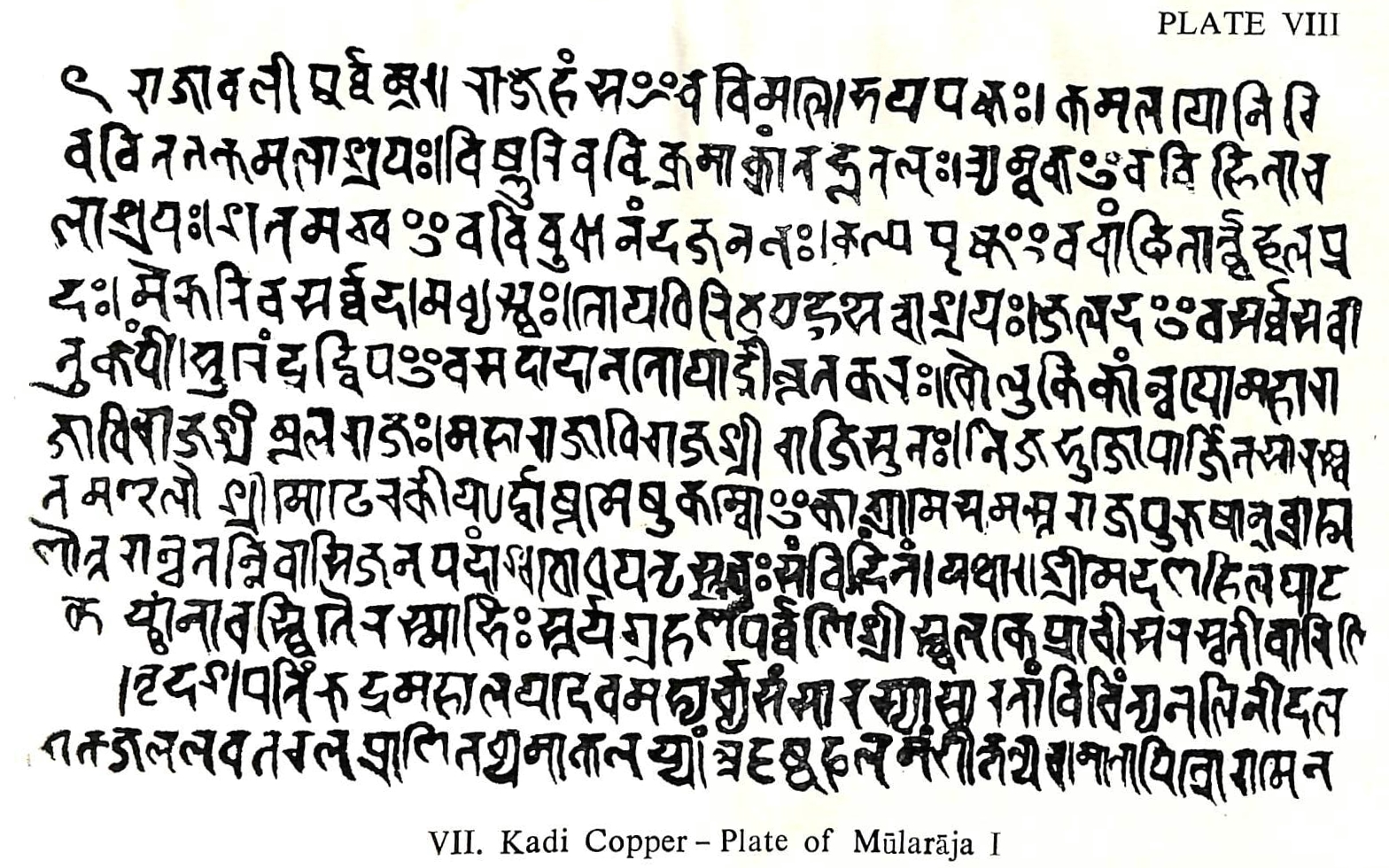
Kadi copper-plate of Mularaja I

In the mid-tenth century CE, Mularaja supplanted the last Chavada (Chapotkata) king of Gujarat and established the Chaulukya or Chaulukya dynasty.

According to Merutunga's legend, Mularaja gained reputation as a warrior. His uncle Samanta-simha would often appoint him as the king when drunk, and depose him when he became sober. Mularaja, who was an ambitious man, was regularly disappointed in this way. One day, when a drunk Samanta-simha appointed him as the king, Mularaja killed his uncle, and became the permanent king. However, Merutunga's legend doesn't seem to be chronologically consistent: it claims that Samanta-simha ruled for 7 years. If Samanta-simha's sister married Raji during his reign, as the legend states, Mularaja would have been less than 7 years old at the time of Samanta-simha's death. This absurdity, coupled with other evidence, has prompted some scholars such as Georg Bühler to dismiss Merutunga's legend as unhistorical.

One of Mularaja's own inscriptions states that he conquered the region watered by Sarasvati river with the strength of his arms. The Vadnagar prashasti inscription of his descendant Kumarapala states that he took the Chapotkata princes captive. Bühler theorized that Mularaja was an outsider who captured Samanta-simha's kingdom. However, Asoke Majumdar proposed that he was indeed a relative of the king, based on the following facts: The Vadnagar inscription as well as the writings of Hemachandra suggest that Mularaja reduced the tax burden on the citizens. The inscription also states that he shared the wealth of the Chapotkata kings with his relatives, Brahmins, bards, and servants. Majumdar argues that if Mularaja had captured the Chapotkata kingdom with an army, he would not have felt the need to resort to such appeasement. Therefore, Majumdar theorizes that Mularaja indeed murdered his uncle and then consolidated power with 'soft' measures such as reduced tax burden and sharing of wealth.

However, there is no doubt that Mularaja dethroned the Chapotkata king. One of Mularaja's own inscriptions states that he conquered the region watered by Sarasvati river with the strength of his arms. The Vadnagar prashasti inscription of his descendant Kumarapala states that he took the Chapotkata princes captive, took their fortune for his own enjoyment, and became popular among his subjects because of excessively light taxation.

According to the later Chaulukya court poet Someshvara's Surathotsava Mahakavya, Mularaja appointed Someshvara's ancestor Sola-sharman as the royal priest (purohita), and Sola-sharman performed several ritual sacrifices. According to Bühler, such changes to the royal household would have not happened, if Mularaja had ascended the throne by the right of succession after the death of the last Chapotkata king. Therefore, Bühler theorized that Mularaja was an outsider who captured Samanta-simha's kingdom. However, historian Asoke Majumdar proposed that he was indeed a relative of the king, based on the following facts: The Vadnagar inscription as well as the writings of Hemachandra suggest that Mularaja reduced the tax burden on the citizens. The inscription also states that he shared the wealth of the Chapotkata kings with his relatives, Brahmins, bards, and servants. Majumdar argues that if Mularaja had captured the Chapotkata kingdom with an army, he would not have felt the need to resort to such appeasement. Therefore, Majumdar theorizes that Mularaja indeed murdered his uncle and then consolidated power with 'soft' measures such as reduced tax burden and sharing of wealth.

== Military conflicts ==
At the time of his ascension, Mūlarāja's kingdom was probably limited to the territory called Sarasvata-mandala, which included present-day Mehsana, Radhanpur, and Palanpur. By the end of his reign, his kingdom extended from Mount Abu in the north to Lata region in the south.

=== War against Grāharipu and Lakṣa ===
Hemacandra's writings state that Mūlarāja defeated Grāharipu, the Chudasama king of Saurashtra. However, no other Chaulukya-era accounts mention this victory. According to Hemacandra, one night, the god Mahādeva appeared in Mūlarāja's dream, and ordered him to vanquish Grāharipu. In the morning, Mūlarāja consulted his ministers Jambaka and Jehula, as he was apprehensive of causing troubles to the pilgrims who visited Prabhasa in Saurashtra. According to Hemacandra's commentator Abhayatilaka Gaṇi, Jambaka was his Mahāmantrin (chief minister) while Jehula, the Rānaka of Khairalu (now Kheralu), was his Mahāpradhāna (prime minister). Jehula told Mūlarāja that Graharipu was a tyrant who tortured pilgrims and indulged in vices such as eating flesh, drinking wine and hunting deer on Mt. Ujjayanta. Jambaka described Grāharipu as a very strong king, and declared that only Mularaja was capable of defeating him. Both the ministers urged Mularaja to attack Graharipu.

Mūlarāja launched a campaign against Graharipu on the day of Vijayādaśamī. When the Chalukya army reached the Jambumāli forest, Grāharipu attempted a peaceful resolution by sending his messenger, who asked Mūlarāja to retreat, stating that there was no enmity between the two kings. However, Mūlarāja refused to do so, declaring that Mularaja was a despicable person whose vices could be attributed to he being the son of a mleccha woma. When Mularaja continued his march, Graharipu started his war preparations. His allies included Medas (Bhillas according to Abhayatilaka-Gaṇi), his friend Lakṣa (who had freed Kaccha from the Turuṣkas), and a king named Sindhurāja. After the war began, he was joined by a mlechchha chief (a Turuṣka, according to Abhayatilaka-Gaṇi).

Mūlarāja was supported by the kings Mahitrāta, Śailaprastha, Revatimitra, Gaṅgamaha of Gaṅgadvāra and his brother Gaṅgāmahā. The Paramāra king of Abu, who lived at Śrīmāla, also joined him. In addition, Mularaja was supported by the Bhillas and the Kauravas. After the battle began, several others including the king of Saptakāśī and a number of Gujarati soldiers, joined him.

Most of the allies named by Hemacandra appear to be fictional, but Lakṣa appears to be a historical personage, as he has been mentioned in several other chronicles including Kīrti-Kaumudī, Vasanta-Vilāsa, and Sukṛta-Saṅkīrtana. He may be same as Lākhā Phulāni, whom the Jāḍejā princes of Kutch count among their ancestors, and whom the bardic chronicles variously date between 841 and 1144 CE.

The battle took place on the river Jambumāli (identified as Bhogavo River in Saurashtra; a village named Jambu near Limbdi is located on the banks of this river). The battle continued for two days indecisively. On third day, Mūlarāja entered battle on an elephant and Grāharipu mounted on his elephant in rage. Mūlarāja overpowered Grāharipu in a single combat and throw him down from his elephant, and had him tied up with ropes.

Lakṣa, wearing white clothes, rushed in and abused Mūlarāja calling him Mula. He asked Mūlarāja to release Grāharipu, but Mūlarāja refused to comply, on the grounds that the captive was a beef-eater. This led to another single combat, in which Mūlarāja killed Lakṣa with a spear. The men of Sauraṣṭra then made a submission before Mūlarāja, dressed as women. The king then released the prisoners and visited the holy Prabhāsa city in Saurashtra.

The fight between Mūlarāja and Lakṣa has also been mentioned by the 14th century writer Merutuṅga in Prabandha-Cintamaṇi. According to this version, Lakṣa (or Lākhā) was the son of Phulaḍa, who was a meat-herd. Phulada married Kāmalatā, a daughter of Paramāra king Kīrtirāja. Lakṣa repulsed Mularaja's attacks 11 times. However, in their 12th fight, Mularaja besieged his fort Kapilkot (now Kera, Kutch), killed him, and trod him on his beard. Enraged by his insulting action, Laksha's mother cursed Mularaja's family to be afflicted with leprosy. A similar account is also given in Kumarapalacharita.

Historian Asoke Majumdar theorizes that Mularaja attacked Graharipu on "some flimsy pretext", as Mahadeva's-order-in-a-dream was a popular device used by Sanskrit authors to justify the otherwise inexcusable actions of their heroes. Mularaja's descendants fought against the kings of Kachchha and Saurashtra, so it appears that he managed to annex some parts of these kingdoms, but could not completely subjugate them.

=== Conflict with Vigraharaja II and Bārapa ===
Merutuṅga states that Mūlarāja once faced simultaneous invasions at the northern and southern frontiers of his kingdom. The northern invader was the king of Sapādalakṣa, who can be identified as the Śākambharī Cāhamāna ruler Vigraharāja II. This invasion finds a mention in the later Chahamana accounts, but is not mentioned in Vigraharaja's 973 CE inscription, so it must have happened sometime after 973 CE. The southern invader was the Lata Chalukya ruler Bārapa, a vassal of the Kalyani Chalukya ruler Tailapa II.

According to Merutuṅga, Mūlarāja's ministers advised him to take shelter in the Kanthā-durga fort until Navarātri, when Vigraharāja would depart to perform the traditional worship of his family deity, and then attack Bārapa. Mūlarāja agreed to this suggestion, but unexpectedly, Vigraharāja did not depart on Navaratri. Mūlarāja then collected a large number of soldiers from different parts of his kingdom, and led an army to the Cāhamāna camp. He managed to enter the royal pavilion of Vigraharāja, who, after a short conversation, was impressed with his bravery. Mūlarāja asked Vigraharāja not to attack him while he was engaged in a war with Bārapa, and the Cāhamāna agreed to the demand. Vigraharāja also promised to maintain friendly relations with Mūlarāja, who subsequently attacked and killed Bārapa.

Pṛthvīrāja Vijaya, which was composed under Cāhamāna patronage, states that Vigraharāja forced Mūlarāja to take shelter in Kanthā-durga, and advanced as far as Bhṛgukaccha (modern Bharuch), where he built a temple dedicated to the goddess Aśapuri.

It is hard to determine the historical truth from these different accounts. Historian R. B. Singh theorizes that Mūlarāja ceded a part of his territory to the Cāhamānas. Historian Dasharatha Sharma also believes that the conflict ended with some advantage for Vigraharāja, who allied with Bārapa and helped him achieve independence. Historian Asoke Kumar Majumdar theorizes that Mūlarāja may have paid Vigraharāja money to win him over, and the two kings may have then jointly marched up to Bhṛgukaccha against Bārapa.

== Religion ==
The Jain authors present Mularaja as fully involved in Vedic and Brahmanical notions of kingship, while at the same time extensively supporting the Jains as a matter of royal policy. Although he was a Shaivaite, he built Mulavasatika (Mula's residence) temple for Digambaras and the Mulanatha-jinadeva (the Jina who is Mula's lord) temple for the Śvetāmbaras.

Surathotsava of Someshvara, a thirteenth century Brahmana, describes Mularaja being consecrated as king through the performance of a Vedic Vajapeya sacrifice.

=== Temples ===
The original Rudra Mahalaya Temple at Shristhala (now Siddhpur) is ascribed to him traditionally. According to Kadi copperplate grant, Rudra Mahalaya was already there in 987 CE. He had constructed Munjaladevaswami and Tripurushaprasada temples in Anahilapataka (now Patan). He had also built Mulnarayana-prasada at Siddhpur. The Mulavasahika Jain temple is ascribed to him. Jinaprabha mentions the temple of Mulanathjinadeva which is probably same as Munjaladevaswami. In 954 CE, Minister Kunkana built a Jain temple at Chandravati which was consecrated by Sarvadevasuri. The Mulavastika temple in Patan constructed by Mularaja is also mentioned in an Digambara Jain inscription dated Samvat 1250s of Bhima II rule. Merutunga's Prabandha-Chintamani mentions building of Muleshwara temple at Mandali (now Mandal) which is the same as Mulanathadeva temple mentioned in Kadi copperplate grants. This is last temple built before 987 CE.

After defeating Graharipu, he had probably rebuilt large temple at Somnath. H. P. Shastri and M. A. Dhaky had concluded this based on paleographic and stylistic evidences. He had settled Brahmans in Vadnagar migrated from North India. He probably had built Hatakeshwara temple for them but the original temple is obscured following major renovation in 19th century.

Muni Bawa Temple near Thangadh is an extant temple of this period. The older part of Adinath temple at Vadnagar and ruins of Khokhra-dera at Kanthkot were built during later period of his reign. The temple of Harishchandra-ni-Chori in Shamlaji also belongs to this period.
