= Durlabharaja (Chaulukya dynasty) =

King of Gujarat from 1008 to 1022

King of Gujarat
- Reign: c. 1008–1022 CE
- Predecessor: Vallabharaja
- Successor: Bhima I
- dynasty: Chaulukya (Solanki)
- Father: Chamundaraja

Durlabha-raja (r. c. 1008–1022 CE) was an Indian king who ruled parts of present-day Gujarat from his capital at Anahilapataka (modern Patan). He was a member of the Chaulukya (also called Chalukya or Solanki) dynasty.

== Early life ==
Durlabha was a son of the Chaulukya king Chamundaraja. He ascended the throne after his brother Vallabharaja unexpectedly died of smallpox.

== Military career ==
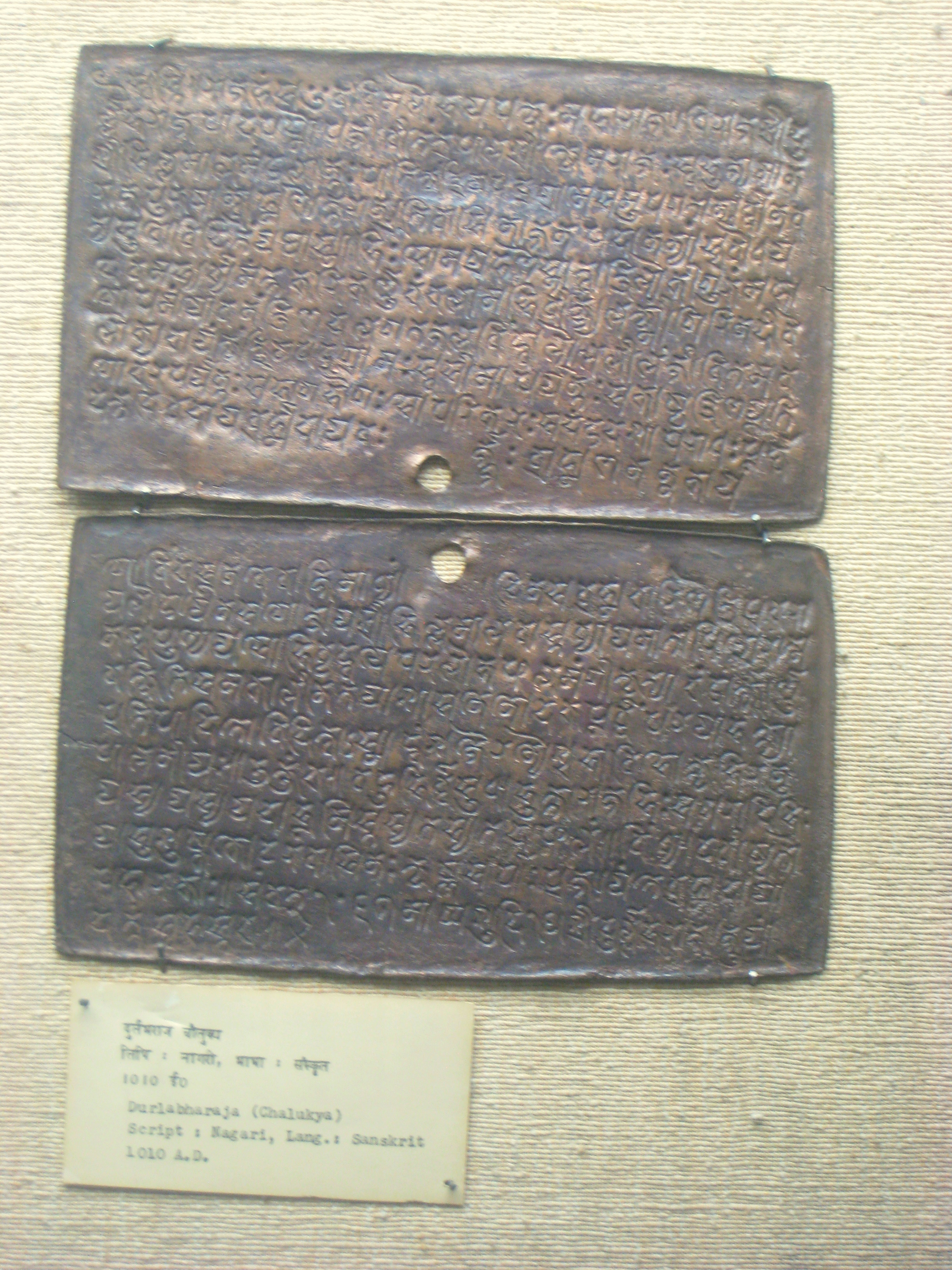
A 1010 CE copper-plate inscription from the reign of Durlabharaja

Durlabha's biggest achievement was his successful invasion of the Lata region. He probably defeated the Lata Chalukya ruler Kirtiraja (or Kirtipala), who was a vassal of the Kalyani Chalukyas. The Kalyani Chalukya king Jayasimha was preoccupied in wars against the Chola dynasty, taking advantage of which Durlabha may have invaded Lata. Shortly after, Kirtiraja appears to have regained independence (or regained the Kalyani Chalukya vassalship). However, in 1018 CE, the Paramara king Bhoja also invaded Lata and defeated Kirtiraja.

A legendary account by the 12th century writer Hemachandra mentions that Durlabha defeated a confederacy of several kings. According to this account, Durlabha was invited to the svayamvara (husband-selection) ceremony of Durlabha-devi, the sister of king Mahendra of Naddula. His rivals at the ceremony included the kings of Andhra, Anga, Avanti, Chedi, Gurjara, Huna, Kashi, Kuru, Mathura, and Vindhya. Among all these kings, Durlabha-devi chose Durlabha. Mahendra also gave his younger sister Lakshmi in marriage to Durlabha's younger brother Nagaraja. The rejected suitors jointly attacked Durlabha's party during his return journey to Gujarat. Durlabha repulsed the attack and marched home with his new bride. This legend does not seem to be historically accurate. The chief of Naddula was a relatively insignificant ruler, and it is hard to believe that so many major rulers left their kingdoms to attend his ceremony at a time when northern India was under attacks from Mahmud of Ghazni. The defeat of all these powerful kings by Durlabha also seems implausible.

The 14th century writer Merutunga claims that after his retirement, Durlabha passed through Malwa on his way to Kashi. There, he was insulted by the Paramara king Munja. He returned to Gujarat, and asked his successor Bhima I to punish Munja. This account is an adaption of earlier legends, which name the insulted king as Chamundaraja. It is historically inaccurate, because Munja died nearly a decade before Durlabha's ascension.

According to Hemachandra, Durlabha died childless, and was succeeded by his nephew Bhima I.

== Cultural activities ==
According to Someshvara's Surathotsava Mahakavya, his ancestor Munja served as a priest (purohita) to Durlabha-raja.

According to the 14th century writer Merutunga, Durlabha built a 7-storey palace in his capital Anahilapataka, along with an elephant stable and a clock tower. He also commissioned the Madanashankara Shiva temple in memory of his brother Vallabha. In addition he also commissioned the Durlabha Sarovar (water tank). The Durlabhmeru temple is probably built by him too. The Upakeshagaccha-pattavali mentions the Mahavira temple built by Shreshthi Kapardi in 1016 CE which was consecrated by Siddhasuri.

Other extant temples attributed to the first quarter of 11th century include original Bhadreshwar Jain Temple (now completely rebuilt following 2001 Gujarat earthquake); Vishnu Temple at Sander village in Patan district; Akhada Mahadeva temple at Vasai and Vishnu Temple at Khandosan, both in Vijapur Taluka of Mehsana district in Gujarat.

According to the Jain writer Jnanavimala, the Kharatara gachchha (sect) of Jain monks was established during Durlabha's reign. The group's founder Vardhamana Suri and his disciple Jineshvara visited Durlabha's court. There, Jineshvara defeated the Chaityavasins (another sect) in a philosophical debate. Durlabha conferred the title kharatara (very keen) on Jineshvara. When Jineshvara succeeded Vardhamana Suri as the head monk, his sect came to be known as the Kharatara gachchha.
