= Vallabharaja =

King of Gujarat in 1008

King of Gujarat
- Reign: c. 1008 CE
- Predecessor: Chamundaraja
- Successor: Durlabharaja
- dynasty: Chaulukya (Solanki)
- Father: Chamundaraja

Vallabha-raja (r. c. 1008 CE) was an Indian king who ruled parts of present-day Gujarat. He was a member of the Chaulukya (also called Chalukya or Solanki) dynasty. He ruled for less than a year, and died of smallpox while marching against an enemy.

== Early life ==
Vallabha was a son of his predecessor, Chamundaraja. According to the 13th Jain scholar Abhayatilaka Gani, when Chamundaraja became incapable of governing the kingdom, his sister Vachinidevi appointed Vallabha as the new king. The 14th-century writer Merutunga, on the other hand, claims that Vallabha ascended the throne after his father's death, and ruled for six months.

Some of the Chaulukya inscriptions omit his name in the genealogical lists, probably because of his short reign. However, most inscriptions (including the Vadnagar prashasti) mention him as the successor of Chamundaraja. The 12th century Jain scholar Hemachandra composed a benedictory verse devoted to him. Such verses were composed only for the Chaulukya kings, which indicates that Vallabha did indeed rule as a king, although for a very brief period.

== Death ==
According to the later Jain chronicles, Durlabharaja marched against a kingdom, because its ruler had insulted his father Chamundaraja. However, he died of smallpox during this march. Some of these chronicles identify the enemy kingdom as Malwa, which was ruled by the Paramaras.

The 12th-century writer Hemachandra states that Chamundaraja left for a pilgrimage to Varanasi after his retirement. On the way, his royal umbrella was confiscated (presumably, by the ruler of a kingdom located on the way). He returned to Gujarat, and asked Vallabha to avenge this insult. The 14th-century writer Merutunga mentions the same incident, but replaces Chamunda with Durlabha, and Vallabha with Bhima I. Merutunga's version is known to have historical inaccuracies.

The 12th-century Vadnagar prashasti inscription states that the kings of Malwa were shaken when they heard about Vallabha's marches. It does not state that he actually reached Malwa. The 13th-century writer Abhayatilaka Gani, who wrote a commentary on Hemachandra's work, states that Malwa was the kingdom against which Vallabha marched to avenge the insult against Chamundaraja. However, his conclusion was based on a particular verse in which Hemachandra states that Vallabha passed by the confluence of the Para and the Sindhu rivers. According to the 12th-century text Sarasvati-Kanthabharana, the country where these two rivers met was ruled by the Naga kings. Historian A. K. Majumdar speculates that Vallabha died not during a march against Malwa, but during a march to a northern kingdom, where he intended to secure allies for his upcoming campaign against Malwa.

The 14th-century writer Merutunga embellishes the earlier accounts by claiming that Vallabha not only reached Malwa, but also besieged the Paramara capital Dhara. The later writer Jayasimha Suri states that the king against whom Vallabha marched was Munja. These accounts by the later writers are not historically accurate. For example, it is known that Munja died in the 990s, around a decade before the said march, which took place around 1008 CE. Hemachandra's Dvyashraya makes it clear the Vallabha died before achieving any tangible success in the campaign. Some other works written under Chaulukya patronage, such as Sukrita Sankirtana by Arisimha and Sukrita-Kirti-Kallolini by Udayaprabha, claim that Vallabha defeated the king of Malwa. These claims are not supported by any historical evidence either. Only the fact that Vallabha marched against Malwa appears to be historically true.

Vallabha suffered from a severe disease during the march, and asked his army to return to the Chaulukya capital. Hemachandra does not name this disease, but describes the symptoms of the disease from which Vallabha died. Based on these, Abhayatilaka Gani correctly identified the disease as smallpox.

After Vallabha's death, his brother Durlabharaja ascended the throne.
