= Chaulukya dynasty =

Indian dynasty that ruled Gujarat from 940 to 1244

Chaulukyas of Gujarat (Solankis)
- c. 940 CE–1244 CE
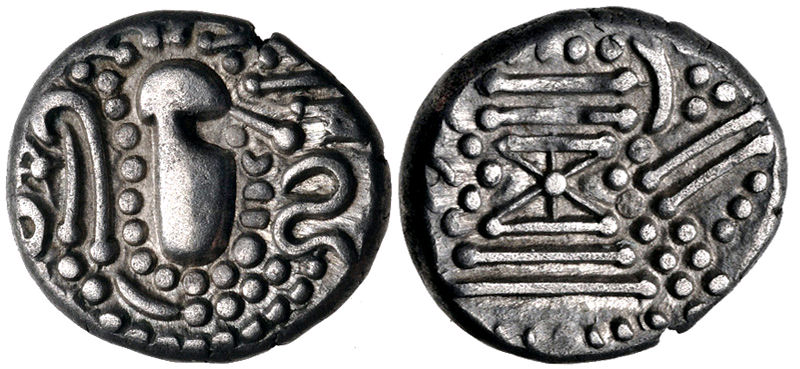
- A Chaulukya-Paramara coin, circa 950–1050 CE. Stylized rendition of Chavda dynasty coins: Indo-Sassanian style bust right; pellets and ornaments around / Stylised fire altar; pellets around.

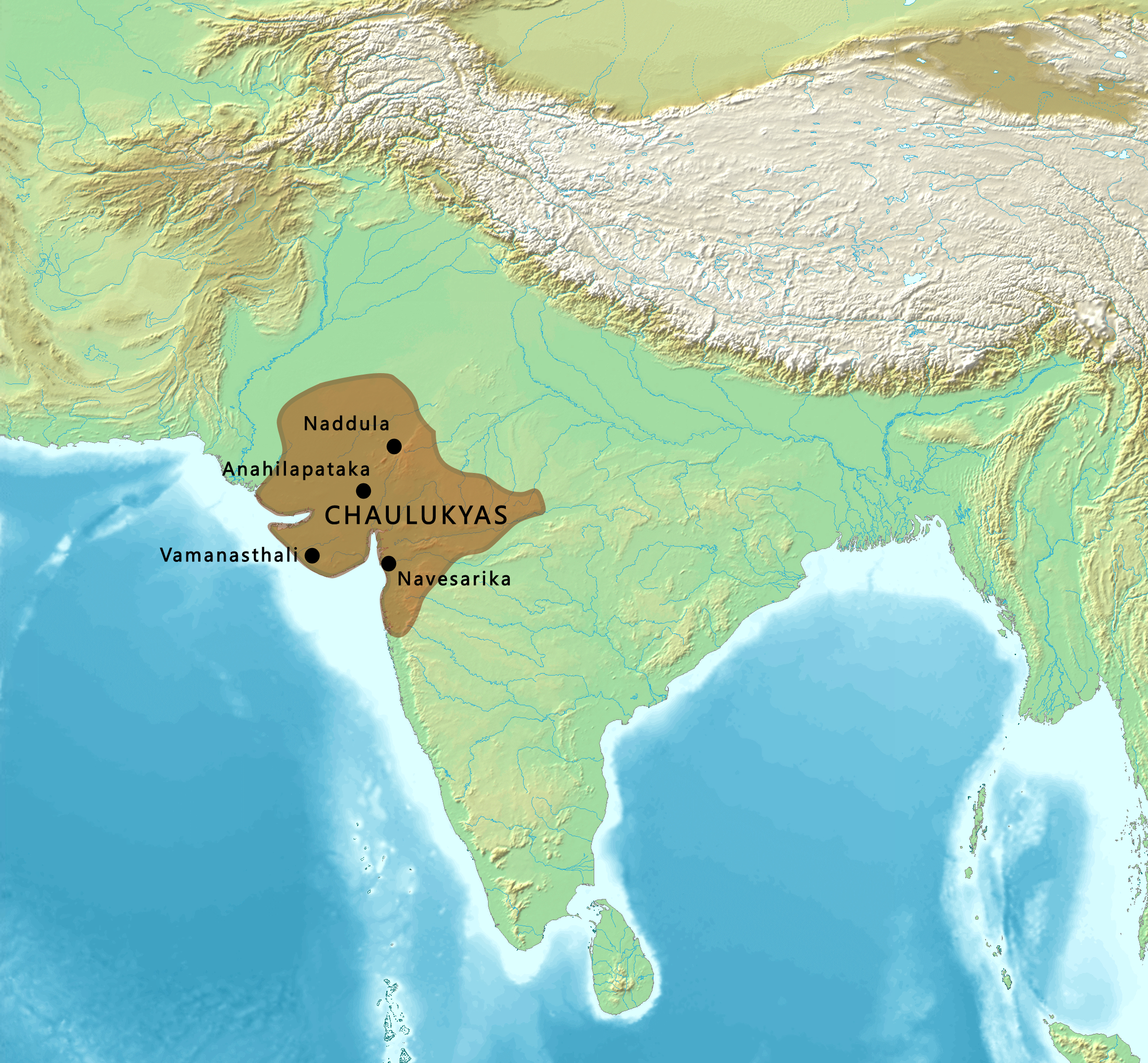
- Map of the Chaulukyas circa 1150 CE
- Capital: Anahilavada (modern Patan)
- Religion: Hinduism, Jainism
- Government: Monarchy
- History
  - Established: c. 940 CE
  - Disestablished: 1244 CE
Preceded by	Succeeded by
Chavda dynasty; Chalukyas of Lata	Vaghela dynasty; Cutch State
- Today part of: India

The Chaulukya dynasty (IAST: Caulukya), also Solanki dynasty, was a dynasty that ruled parts of what are now Gujarat and Rajasthan in north-western India, between c. 940 CE and c. 1244 CE. Their capital was located at Anahilavada (modern Patan). At times, their rule extended to the Malwa region in present-day Madhya Pradesh. The family is also known as the "Solanki dynasty" in the vernacular literature. They belonged to the Solanki clan of Rajputs.

Mularaja, the founder of the dynasty, supplanted the last ruler of the Chavda dynasty around 940 CE. His successors fought several battles with the neighbouring rulers such as the Chudasamas, the Paramaras and the Chahamanas of Shakambhari. During the reign of Bhima I, the Ghaznavid ruler Mahmud invaded the kingdom and raided the Somnath temple during 1024–1025 CE. The Chaulukyas soon recovered, and the kingdom reached its zenith under the rule of Jayasimha Siddharaja and Kumarapala in the 12th century. Several minor dynasties, such as the Chahamanas of Jalor and the Chahamanas of Naddula, served as Chaulukya vassals during this period. After Kumarapala's death, the kingdom was gradually weakened by internal rebellions; uprisings by feudatories; and invasions by the Paramaras, the Ghurids, the Yadavas and others. Taking advantage of this, the Vaghelas, who had earlier served as Chaulukya generals, usurped the power and established a new dynasty in the 1240s.

Several princely state rulers of the Solanki clan claimed descent from the Chaulukyas.

== Name ==
The dynasty used the self-designation "Chaulukya" in all but four of its records. The four exceptions are:

- "Chaulukika" in the Kadi grant of Mularaja
- "Saulkika" in a grant of Chamundaraja
- "Chaulakya" in the Sambhar inscription of Jayasimha
- "Chaullakya" in the Jalor inscription of Kumarapala

Hemachandra, a Jain scholar in the Chaulukya court, generally used the terms "Chaulukya" and "Chulukya". His Dvyasraya Mahakavya mentions the variants "Chulakya", "Chalukka", and "Chulukka"; his Kumarapala-Charita mentions another variant "Chuluga". The Chaulukya court poet Someshvara describes the dynasty as "Chaulukya" (in Kirti-Kaumudi) and "Chulukya" (in the Abu inscription of Vastupala and Tejapala).

"Solanki" or "Solankhi" is a vernacular form of the term.

== Origins ==
Find spots of inscriptions issued during the Chaulukya rule

The word "Chaulukya" is thought to be a variant of the word "Chalukya". Several other dynasties were known by the name "Chalukya", including the Chalukyas of Vatapi, Navasarika, Vemulavada, Kalyani, Vengi and Lata. These dynasties are sometimes thought to be branches of the same family, but the relationship between all of them is not certain. Unlike the Chalukyas of Kalyani and Vengi, the Chaulukyas of Gujarat never claimed a shared descent or any other association with the earliest Chalukya dynasty—the Chalukyas of Vatapi. Moreover, they never used the term "Chalukya" to describe themselves.

However, the Chaulukyas of Gujarat shared a myth of origin with the Chalukyas of Kalyani and Vengi. According to this legend, the progenitor of the dynasty was created by Brahma. The version of the legend mentioned in the Vadnagar prashasti inscription of Kumarapala is as follows: the deities once asked the creator god Brahma to protect them from the danavas (demons). Brahma then created a hero from his chuluka (pot or folded palm in Sanskrit), which was filled with Ganges water. This hero was named "Chulukya", and became the progenitor of the dynasty. A variation of this legend is mentioned by Abhayatilaka Gani in his commentary on Hemachandra's Dvyashraya-Kavya. According to this version, Brahma produced the hero to support the earth, after his other creations disappointed him. These stories are of no historical value, as it was customary for contemporary royal houses to claim mythical and heroic origins. The Kumarapala-Bhupala-Charita of Jayasimha Suri presents Chulukya as a historical warrior, whose capital was Madhupadma. Mularaja was his descendant, with nearly a hundred generations separating the two. This account may be partly historical: Madhupadma has been identified variously as a location outside Gujarat, including present-day Mathura.

C. V. Vaidya theorized that the Chaulukyas were different from the Chalukyas. G. H. Ojha opposed this theory, pointing out that an inscription of the Lata Chalukya ruler Kirtiraja describes his family as "Chalukya", while an inscription of his grandson Trilochanapala describes the family as "Chaulukya". According to Asoke Majumdar, while these similar-sounding names suggest a common origin for all these dynasties, there is no concrete evidence to draw any definitive conclusion. Majumdar theorized that the Chaulukyas were connected to the Sulikas or the Chulikas, a tribe mentioned in several ancient records. This tribe is described as living on the northern frontier of ancient India. However, Majumdar admitted that there is not enough evidence to regard this theory as conclusive.

According to the Agnikula myth mentioned in a 16th-century recension of the legendary epic poem Prithviraj Raso, four Rajput clans including the Chaulukyas were born from a fire-pit on Mount Abu. A section of colonial-era historians interpreted this mythical account to suggest that these clans were foreigners who came to India after the decline of the Gupta Empire around the 5th century CE, and were admitted in the Hindu caste system after performing a fire ritual. The Chaulukya rulers have been called "Gurjararāja" and "Gurjareśvara" ("ruler of Gurjara"). Based on this legend, D. R. Bhandarkar and others theorized that the Chaulukyas were a branch of Gurjaras, whom they believed to be a tribe of foreign origin. Bhandarkar and Augustus Hoernle also believed that the name of the "Lata" region changed to "Gurjaratra" (later Gujarat) during the Chaulukya reign, presumably because they were Gurjaras.

However, this foreign-origin theory is weakened by a number of factors. The Chaulukyas did not claim an Agnikula origin for themselves: it was the neighbouring Paramara rulers who used the legend to explain their own origin. The inscriptions from the reign of Bhima II prove that the Chaulukyas knew about the Agnikula legend, but associated it with the Paramaras, not themselves. The earliest copies of Prithviraj Raso do not mention this legend either. The legend that includes the Chaulukyas among the fire-born clans is first mentioned by the 16th century poets, who may have extended the Paramara legend to include other dynasties, in order to foster Rajput unity against the Mughals. Moreover, there is no evidence that the Chaulukya territory area came to be known as "Gurjaratra" during the Chaulukya reign. "Gurjara" and "Lata" were two distinct historical regions in northern and southern parts of present-day Gujarat respectively, and the term "Lata" was never used to describe the whole of Gujarat. The Chaulukya kings were called "Gurjararāja" and "Gurjareśvara" because they ruled the territory which was already called Gurjara by their time. Several other kings who held similar epithets had earlier ruled this territory: these include the Gurjara-Pratiharas and the Gurjaras of Nandipuri. Historian Asoke Kumar Majumdar points out that even the southern Ganga chief Marasimha II assumed the title "king of Gurjaras" after defeating a northern king on behalf of the Rashtrakutas.

== History ==
=== Early rulers ===
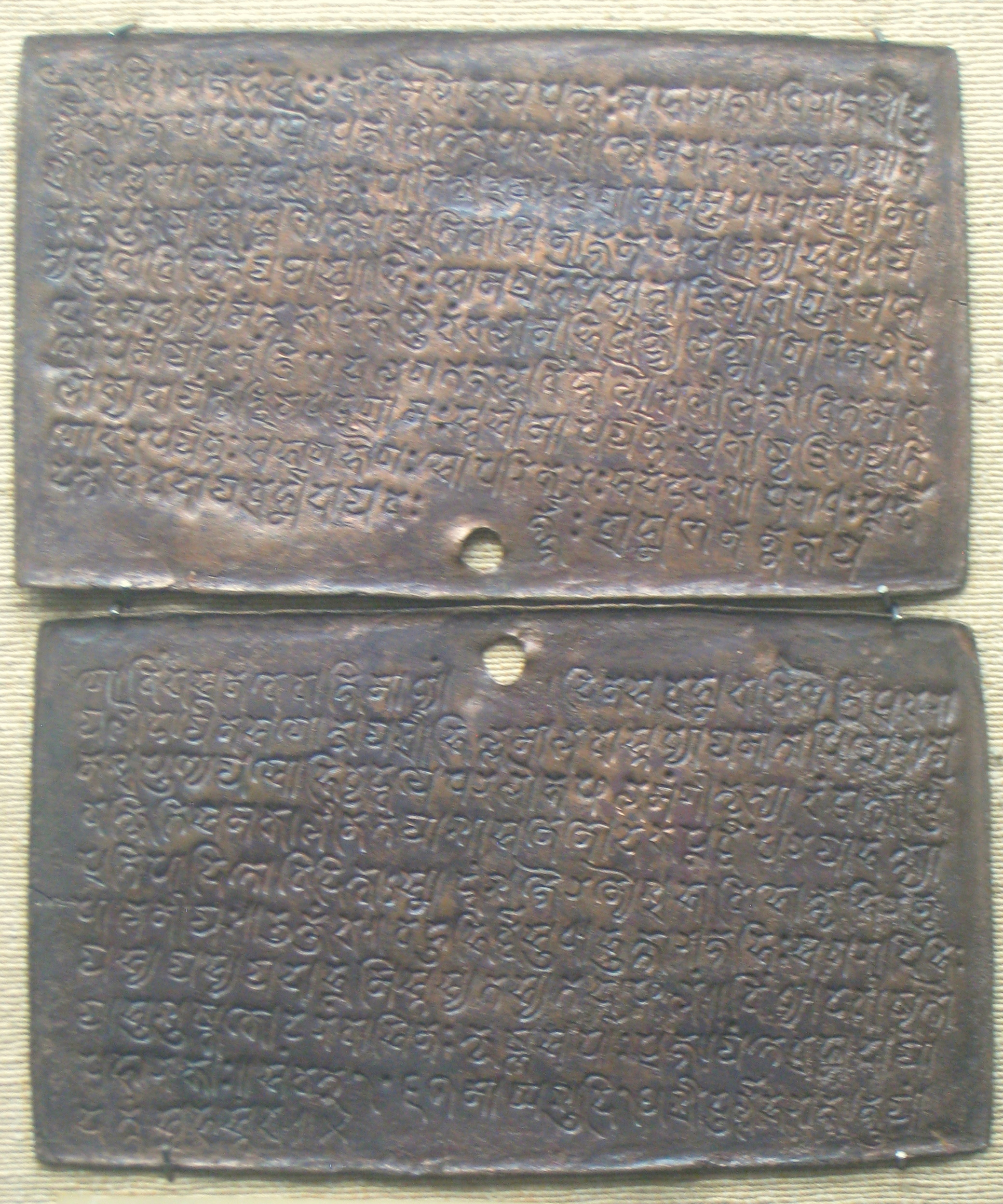
A 1010 CE copper-plate inscription from the reign of Durlabharaja

The Chaulukyas were one of the several dynasties that rose to power amid the decline of the Gurjara-Pratihara and the Rashtrakuta empires. In the mid-tenth century CE, the dynasty’s founder Mularaja supplanted Samantasimha, the last Chavda king. According to legends, he was a nephew of Samantasimha. According to the 12th century chronicler Hemachandra, Mularaja defeated Graharipu, the king of Saurashtra. He also defeated the Lata Chalukya chief Barapa, aided by his son Chamundaraja. Chamundaraja succeeded Mularaja around 996 CE. During his reign, the Paramara king Sindhuraja appears to have invaded the Lata region, which was under Chaulukya suzerainty. Mularaja forced Sindhuraja to retreat; the 14th century chronicler Jayasimha Suri claims that Chamundaraja killed Sindhuraja in a battle, but this claim appears to be doubtful, as it does not appear in any earlier source. Sometime before 1007 CE, the Lata region was captured by the Chalukyas of Kalyani led by Satyashraya. Around 1008 CE, Chamundaraja retired after appointing his son Vallabharaja as the next king. Legendary accounts state that he set out for a pilgrimage to Varanasi. During this journey, he was insulted by a ruler whose kingdom lay on the way to Varanasi. He returned to the Chaulukya capital, and asked his son to avenge his insult. Vallabharaja died of smallpox during a march to the enemy kingdom, which is identified as the Paramara kingdom of Malwa by some chroniclers. Chamundaraja’s other son Durlabharaja became the next king in c. 1008 CE. He invaded the Lata region, and defeated the Lata Chalukya ruler Kirtiraja (or Kirtipala), who was a vassal of the Kalyani Chalukyas. However, Kirtiraja regained control of the region within a short time, before being defeated by the Paramara king Bhoja.

=== Neighbouring rivalries ===
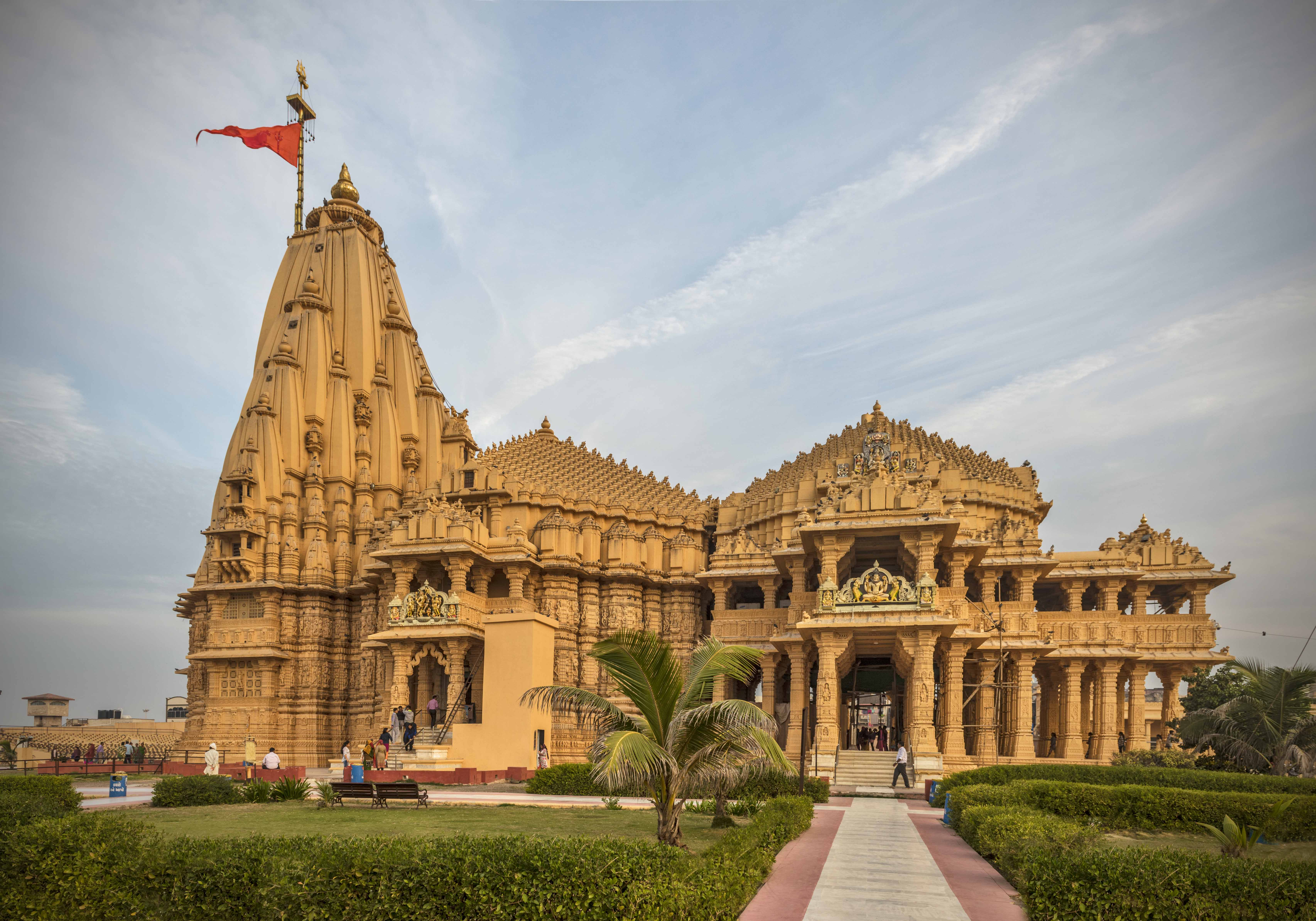
The Somnath temple today

Durlabharaja was succeeded by his nephew Bhima I, who faced an invasion from the Ghaznavid ruler Mahmud during 1024–1025 CE. Bhima fled to Kanthkot, as Mahmud entered the Chaulukya territory unopposed and sacked the Somnath temple. After Mahmud’s departure, Bhima restored the Chaulukya rule. He crushed revolts by the Paramara chiefs of Arbuda, who used to serve as Chaulukya vassals. Bhima also defeated and imprisoned Krishnadeva, a ruler of the Paramara branch of Bhinmal. He unsuccessfully fought against the Naddula Chahamana ruler Anahilla. Anahilla’s sons Balaprasada and Jendraraja defeated Bhima and forced him to release Krishnadeva. Later legendary accounts credit Bhima with a victory against Hammuka, a ruler of Sindh, although the accuracy of this claim is not certain. Semi-legendary accounts suggest that Bhima formed an alliance with the Kalachuri king Lakshmi-Karna, and the two played an important role in the downfall of the Paramara king Bhoja around 1055 CE. According to the 14th century chronicler Merutunga, Bhima and Lakshmi-Karna invaded Bhoja’s kingdom of Malwa from two opposite directions, and Bhoja died of a disease during this invasion. Some Chaulukya chroniclers boast that Bhima annexed Bhoja’s capital Dhara or that he captured Bhoja alive, but these claims are not corroborated by historical evidence. After Bhoja’s death, a rivalry developed between the Bhima and Lakshmi-Karna over sharing the spoils of their victory. Bhima’s son Karna succeeded him around 1064 CE. Bhoja’s brother Udayaditya, supported by the Shakambhari Chahamana king Vigraharaja III, forced Karna to retreat from Malwa. Meanwhile, the Kalachuris managed to capture the Lata region. By 1074 CE, Karna evicted the Kalachuris from Lata, and annexed the region to the Chaulukya kingdom, before losing it to one Trivikramapala within three years. The Naddula Chahamana ruler Prithvipala defeated Karna, and his successor Jojalladeva occupied the Chaulukya capital Anahilapataka, possibly when Karna was busy at another place. The Shakambhari Chahamana king Durlabharaja III also appears to have achieved some military success against Karna, although the Chahamana descriptions of this victory are highly exaggerated. According to legendary chronicles, Karna also defeated Bhil and Koli tribals, who used to raid the Chaulukya territories. He established a city called Karnavati after defeating a Bhil chief named Asha (Āśā). Karnavati is identified with modern Ahmedabad by some, but this is not certain.

=== Imperial expansion ===
Karna’s son Jayasimha Siddharaja (r. c. 1092–1142 CE) greatly expanded the Chaulukya power. He defeated Khangara alias Navaghana, the Chudasama king of Saurashtra. The Naddula Chahamana ruler Asharaja, who had been dethroned by his rival Ratnapala, became a vassal of Jayasimha sometime before 1143 CE. Jayasimha defeated the Shakambhari Chahamana ruler Arnoraja. Later, however, Jayasimha accepted Arnoraja as an ally, and the Chahamana ruler married Jayasimha’s daughter Kanchanadevi. The couple’s son (and thus Jayasimha’s grandson) Someshvara, was brought up at the Chaulukya court. Someshvara’s sons Prithviraja III (better known as Prithviraj Chauhan) and Hariraja were also born in Gujarat. During 1135–1136 CE, Jayasimha annexed the Paramara kingdom of Malwa, with support from Asharaja and Arnoraja. The Paramara kings defeated by him were Naravarman and his successor Yashovarman. Jayasimha continued his eastward march, and reached as far as the Chandela kingdom ruled by Madanavarman. The Chaulukya-Chandela conflict was inconclusive, with both the sides claiming victory. Jayasimha also defeated several minor rulers, including Sindhuraja, who was probably a Soomra king of Sindh.

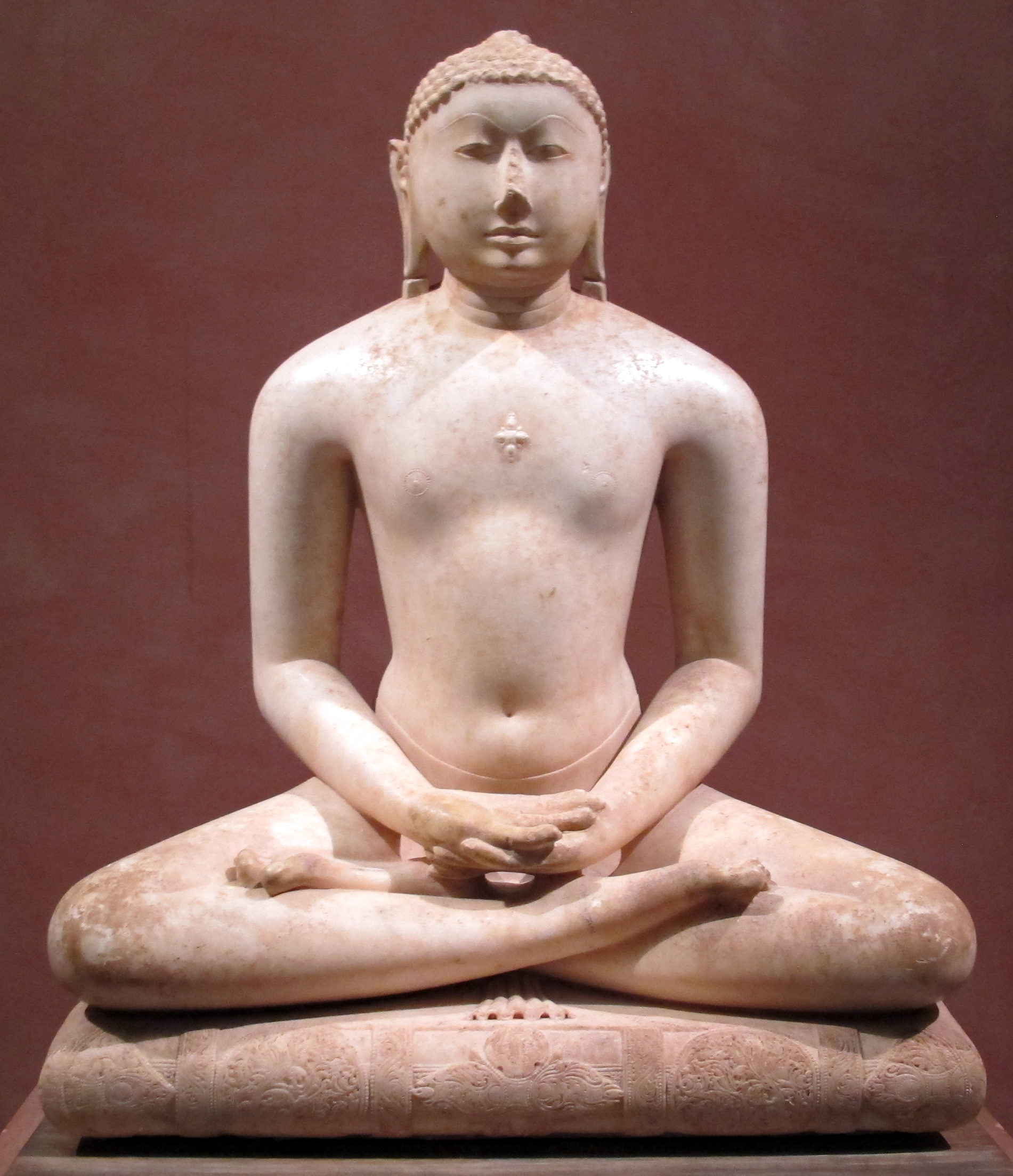
Jain Shvetambara Tirthankara in Meditation, Chaulukya period now in Metropolitan Museum of Art, c. 1000 – c. 1050

Jayasimha was succeeded by his relative Kumarapala, who spent his early life in exile to avoid persecution by Jayasimha. After Jayasimha’s death, Kumarapala came back to the Chaulukya capital and ascended the throne in 1043 CE, with help of his brother-in-law Kanhadadeva. Arnoraja opposed Kumarapala’s ascension to the throne, but Kumarapala defeated him decisively. Kumarapala seems to have helped Asharaja’s son Katukaraja capture the throne of Naddula. Katukaraja’s younger brother and successor Alhanadeva continued to rule as Kumarapala’s vassal. Arnoraja’s son Vigraharaja IV subdued Kumarapala’s Chahamana feudatories at Naddula. The Shakambhari Chahamana-Chaulukya relations seem to have become more cordial when Arnoraja’s son (and Jayasimha’s grandson) Someshvara became the Chahamana king in later years, possibly with support from Kumarapala. After Jayasimha’s death, the Paramara king Jayavarman I regained control of Malwa, but he was soon dethroned by an usurper named Ballala. Kumarapala captured Malwa from Ballala, who was killed by Kumarapala’s Arbuda Paramara feudatory Yashodhavala in a battle. Kumarapala subdued a rebellion by his vassal Vikramasimha, a Paramara chief of Arbuda. The Paramara branch at Kiradu continued to acknowledge Kumarapala’s suzerainty. In the early 1160s, Kumarapala sent an army against Mallikarjuna, the Shilahara king of northern Konkana. This campaign was probably triggered by a Shilahara raid in southern Gujarat, and ended with Mallikarjuna’s death. Kumarapala’s Naddula Chahamana feudatory Alhana put down disturbances in Saurashtra at Kumarapala’s request. Historical evidence suggests that Kumarapala’s empire extended from Chittor and Jaisalmer in the north to the Vindhyas and the Tapti river in the south (ignoring his raid of the Shilahara kingdom of northern Konkana). In the west, it included Kachchha and Saurashtra; in the east, it extended up to at least Vidisha (Bhilsa). Kumarapala was succeeded by Ajayapala, who retained Kumarapala’s territories, but died after a short reign. Ajayapala’s young sons Mularaja II and Bhima II succeeded him one after other. During this period, the Ghurid king Muhammad of Ghor invaded the Chaulukya kingdom in 1178 CE. In the ensuing battle at Kasahrada (or Kayadara), Muhammad was defeated by a large army, which included loyal Chaulukya feudatories such as the Naddula Chahamana ruler Kelhanadeva, the Jalor Chahamana ruler Kirtipala, and the Arbuda Paramara ruler Dharavarsha.

=== Decline ===
The Chaulukyas and main South Asian polities in 1175, on the eve of the Ghurid Empire invasion of the subcontinent

Taking advantage of the young age of Bhima II, some provincial governors rebelled against him in order to establish independent states. His loyal Vaghela feudatory Arnoraja came to his rescue, and died fighting the rebels. Arnoraja’s descendants Lavanaprasada and Viradhavala became powerful during Bhima’s reign. During Bhima’s reign, the Hoysala ruler Veera Ballala II seems to have raided the Lata region. The Yadava ruler Bhillama V also invaded Gujarat, but was forced to retreat by Bhima’s feudatory Kelhanadeva. The Shakambhari Chahamana king Prithviraja III also fought with the Chaulukyas, but Bhima’s general Jagaddeva managed to conclude a peace treaty with Prithviraja sometime before 1187 CE. By the mid-1190s CE, the Ghurids defeated the Prithviraja and the other major Hindu kings of northern India. On 4 February 1197 CE, the Ghurid general Qutb al-Din Aibak invaded Bhima’s capital Anahilapataka, and inflicted a massive defeat on the Chaulukyas. Bhima’s generals Lavanaprasada and Shridhara later forced the Ghurids to retreat, and the capital was back under the Chaulukya rule by 1201 CE. Subhatavarman, the Paramara king of Malwa, invaded the Lata region around 1204 CE, taking advantage of the turmoil caused by the Ghurid invasions. He probably also sacked the Chaulukya capital Anahilapataka. Once again, Lavanaprasada and Shridhara saved the kingdom by forcing Subhatavarman to retreat. During 1205–1210 CE, Bhima’s relative Jayantasimha (or Jayasimha) usurped the throne. In the early 1210s, Subhatavarman’s successor Arjunavarman defeated Jayantasimha, and later established a matrimonial alliance with him. Bhima managed to regain control of the throne during 1223–1226 CE. Meanwhile, the Yadavas invaded the southern part of the Chaulukya kingdom, led by Bhillama’s successors Jaitugi and Simhana. During these invasions, the Chaulukya feudatories in the northern region of Marwar rebelled. Lavanaprasada and Viradhavala warded off the Yadava invasions, and also subdued the rebellions. The Guhilas of Medapata (Guhilots of Mewar) also rebelled against Bhima sometime between 1207 and 1227 CE, and declared their independence. By the end of Bhima’s reign, Lavanaprasada and Viradhavala assumed regal titles such as ‘’Maharajadhiraja’’ ("king of great kings") and ‘’Maharaja’’ ("great king"). However, the two continued to nominally acknowledge Bhima (and his successor Tribhuvanapala) as their overlord. After Tribhuvanapala, they seized the throne, establishing the Vaghela dynasty.

== Culture ==
=== Architecture ===
Māru-Gurjara architecture, or "Chaulukya style", is a style of north Indian temple architecture that originated in Gujarat and Rajasthan from the 11th to 13th centuries, under the Chaulukya dynasty (or Solaṅkī dynasty). Although originating as a regional style in Hindu temple architecture, it became especially popular in Jain temples and, mainly under Jain patronage, later spread across India and to diaspora communities around the world.

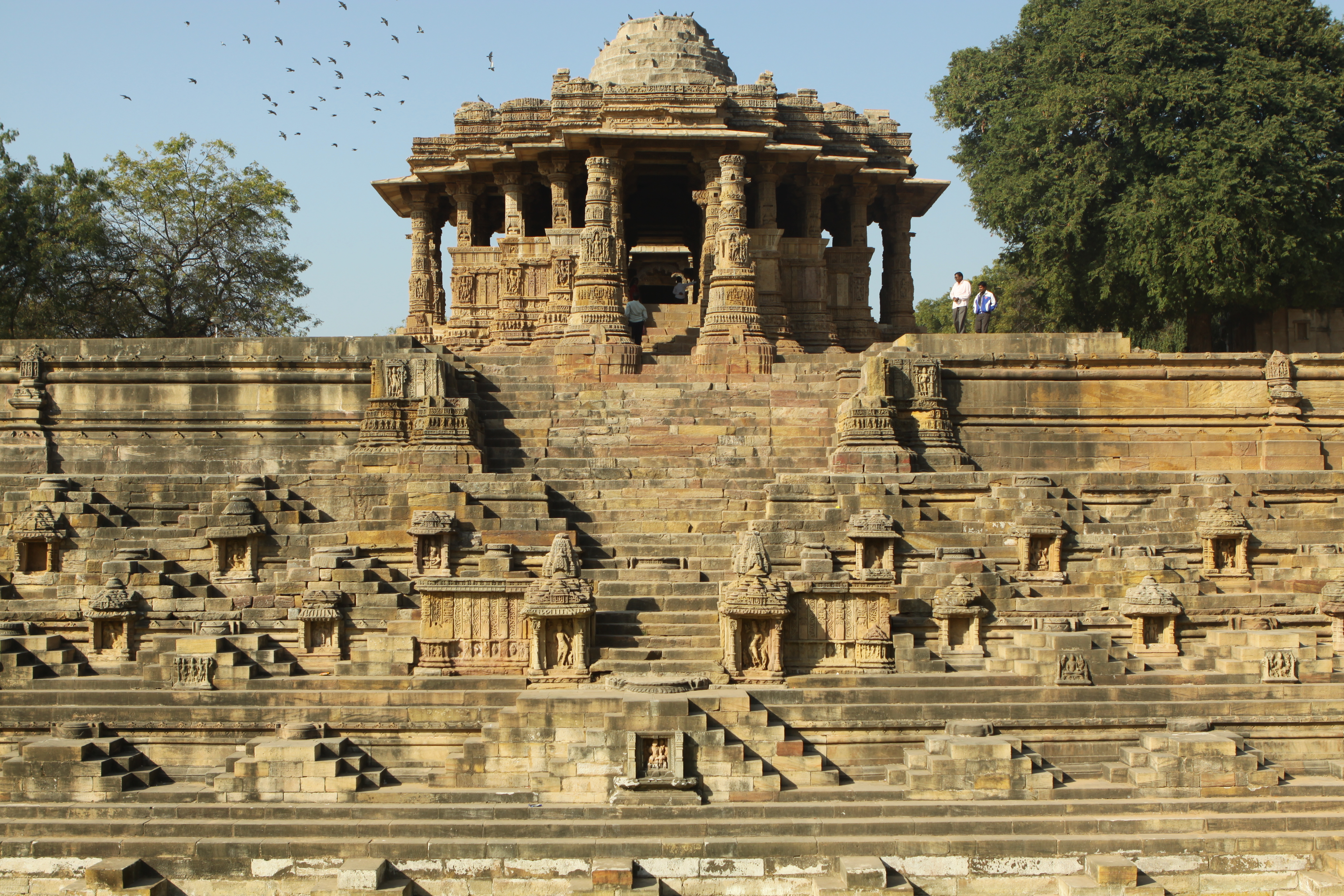
Sun Temple, Modhera, constructed by Bhima I

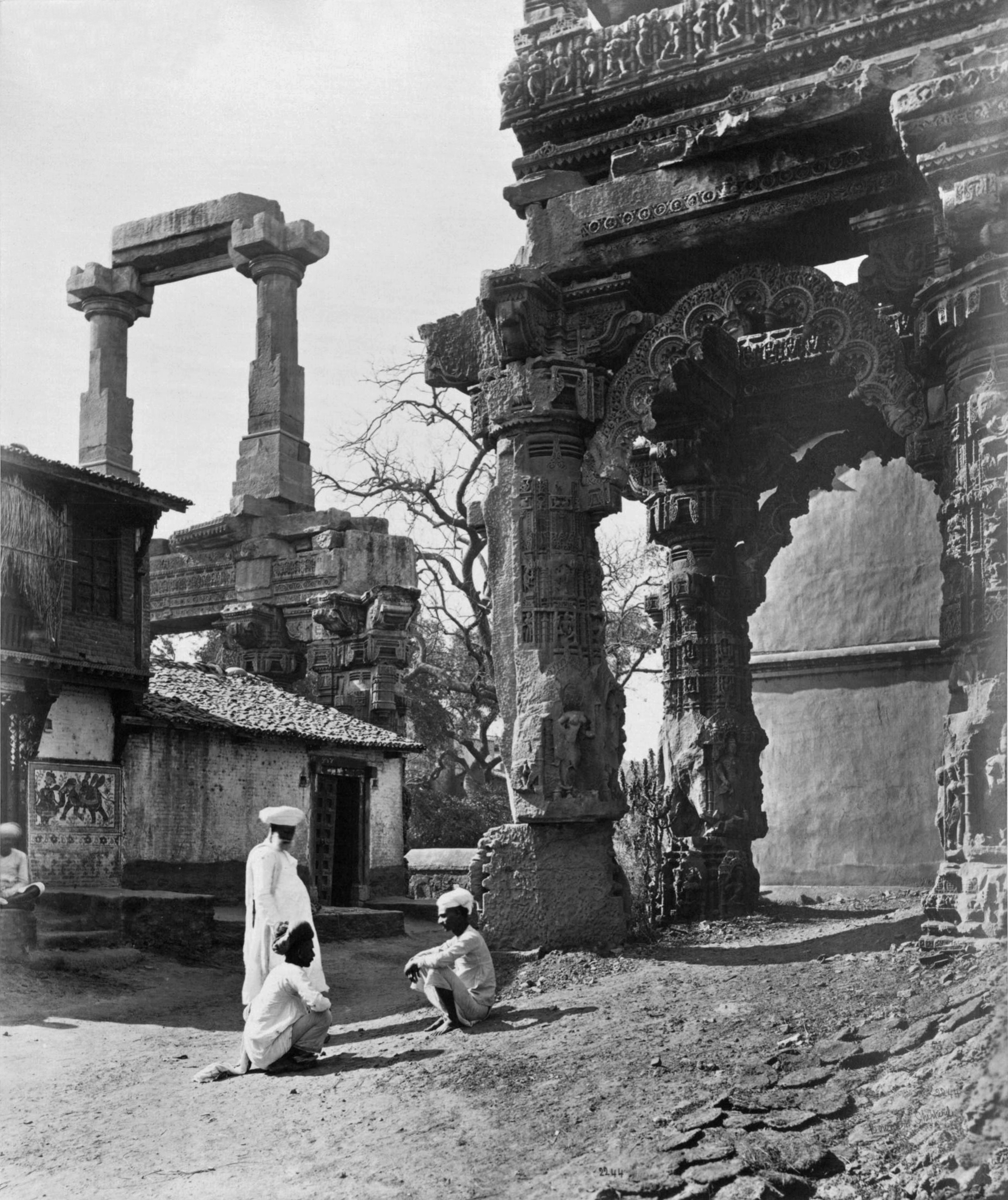
Rudra Mahalaya Temple, renovated or rebuilt by Jayasimha

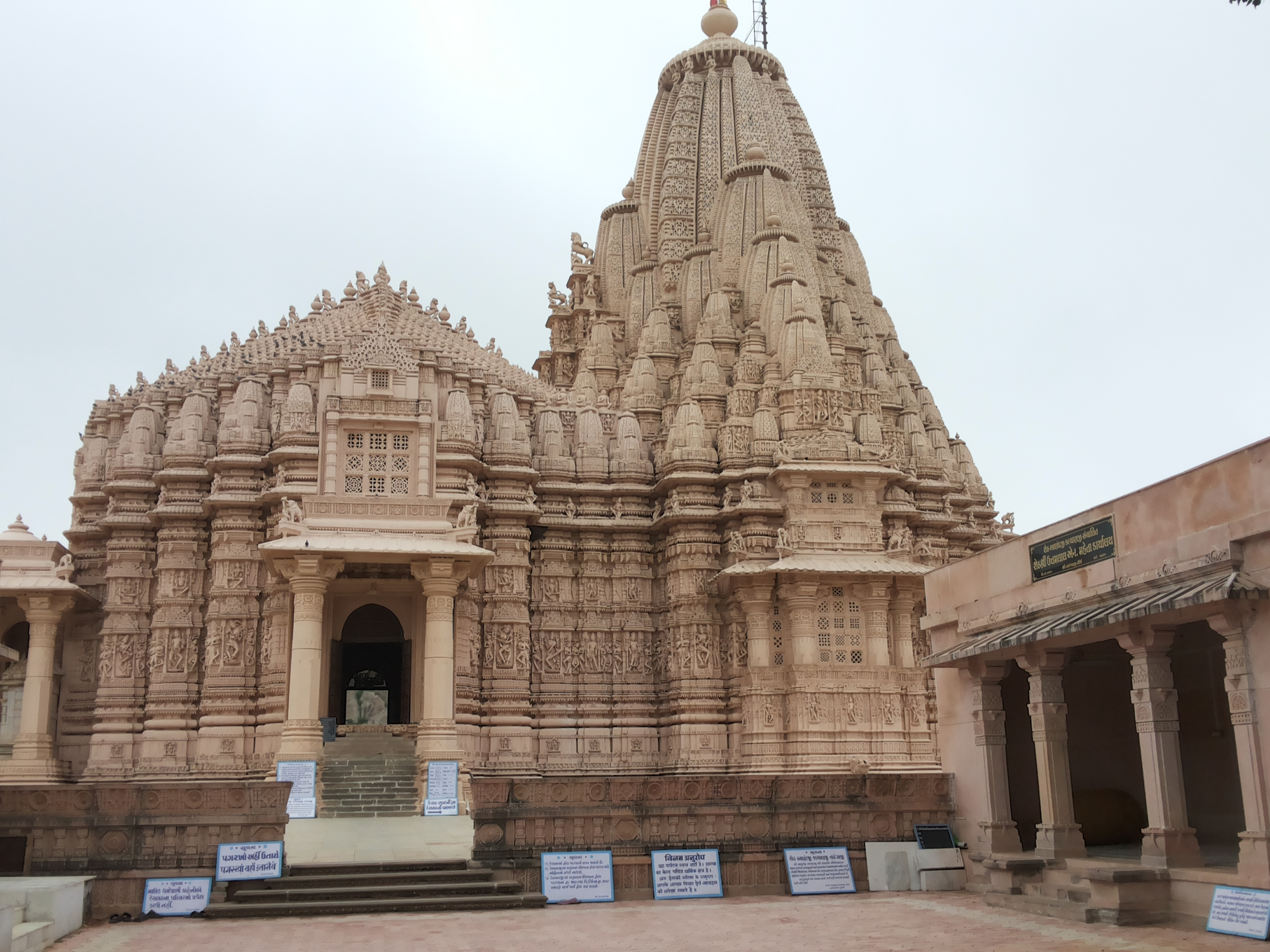
Taranga Jain temple, constructed by Kumarapala

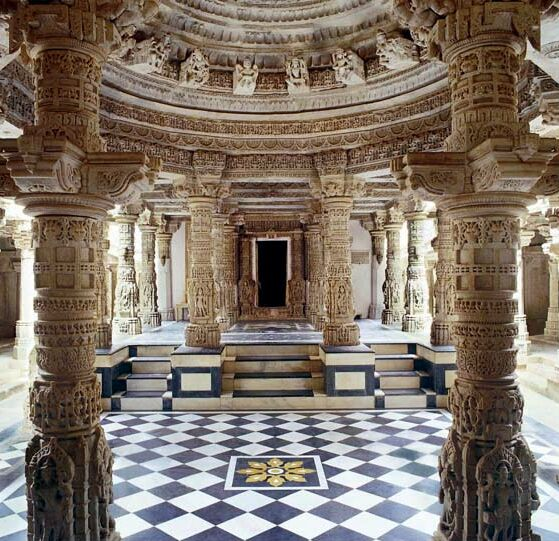
Dilwara Temples, constructed by Chaulukya ministers

=== Religion ===
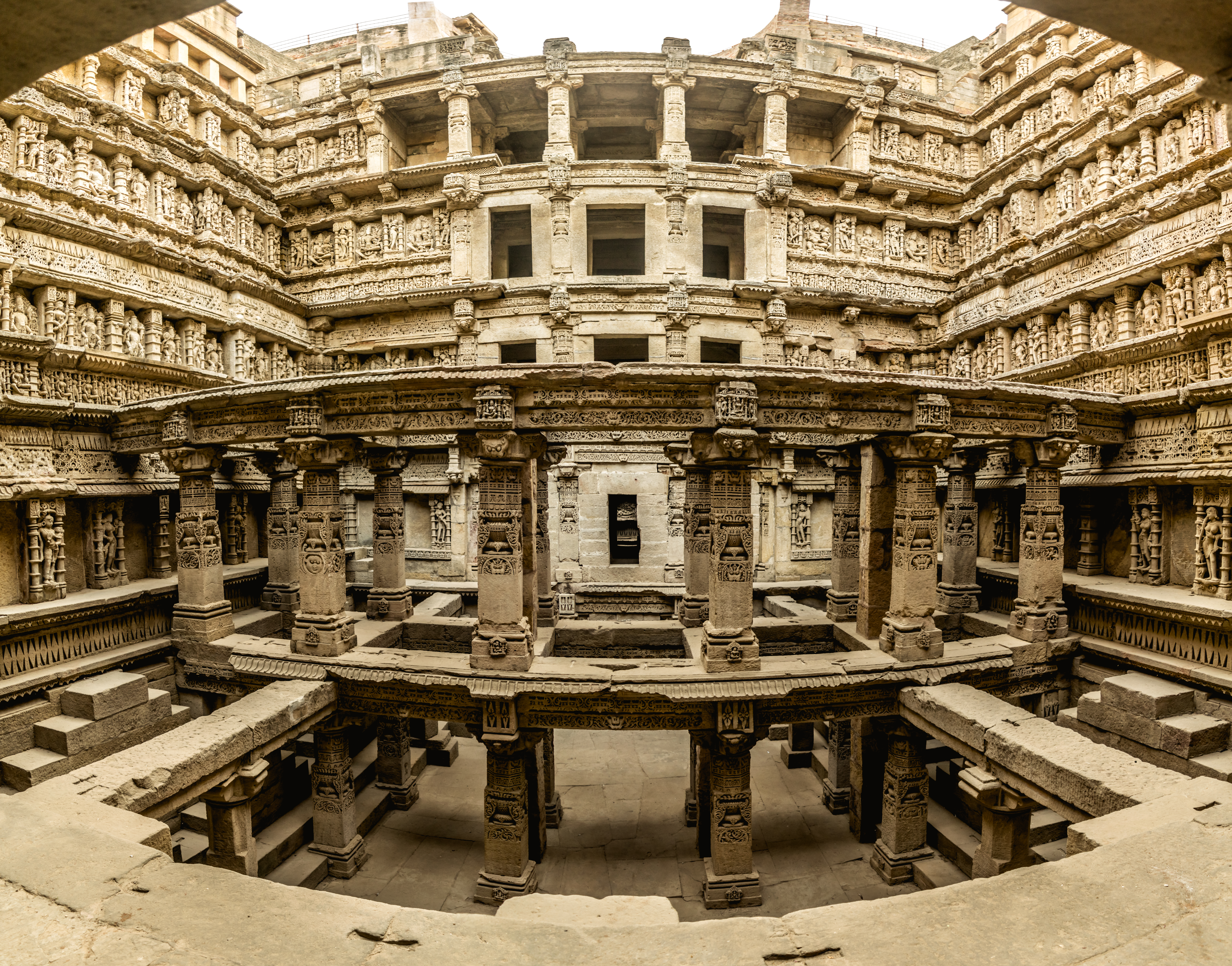
The Rani ki vav was constructed during the rule of the Chaulukya dynasty. It is located on the banks of Saraswati River.

Most of the dynasty's rulers were Shaivaite, although they also patronized Jainism. The dynasty's founder Mularaja is said to have built Mulavasatika temple for Digambara Jains and the Mulanatha-Jinadeva temple for the Svetambara Jains. The earliest of the Dilwara Temples and the Modhera Sun Temple were constructed during the reign of Bhima I. According to popular tradition, his queen Udayamati also commissioned the Queen's step-well. Kumarapala started patronizing Jainism at some point in his life, and the subsequent Jain accounts portray him as the last great royal patron of Jainism. The Chaulukya rulers also endowed mosques to maintain good relationship with the Muslim traders.

== Claimed descendants ==
The Vaghela dynasty, which succeeded the Chaulukyas, claimed descent from a sister of Kumarapala.

Various princely state dynasties calling themselves Solanki (the vernacular form of Chaulukya) claimed descent from the Chaulukyas as well. These included the rulers of the Lunavada State, which was a tributary to the Marathas before coming under the British rule.

== List of rulers ==
The Chalukya rulers of Gujarat, with approximate dates of reign, are as follows:

List of Chaulukya (Solanki) dynasty rulers
Serial No.	Ruler	Reign (CE)
1	Mularaja	940–995
2	Chamundaraja	996–1008
3	Vallabharaja	1008
4	Durlabharaja	1008–1022
5	Bhima I	1022–1064
6	Karna	1064–1092
7	Jayasimha Siddharaja	1092–1142
8	Kumarapala	1142–1171
9	Ajayapala	1171–1175
10	Mularaja II	1175–1178
11	Bhima II	1178–1240
12	Tribhuvanapala	1240–1244

=== Family tree ===
Chaulukya dynasty

Mularaja I^{(1)} r. c. 941-996
Chamundaraja^{(2)} r. c. 996-1008
Vallabharaja^{(3)} r. c. 1008	Durlabharaja^{(4)} r. c. 1008-1022	Nagaraja
Bhima I^{(5)} r. c. 1022-1064
Kshemaraja	Karna^{(6)} r. c. 1064-1092
Devaprasada	Jayasimha; Siddharaja^{(7)} r. c. 1092-1142
Tribhuvanpala
Kumarapala^{(8)} r. c. 1143-1172
Ajayapala^{(9)} r. c. 1172-1175
Mularaja II^{(10)} r. c. 1175-1178	Bhima II^{(11)} r. c. 1178-1240	Tribhuvanapala^{(12)} r. c. 1240-1244

== List of feudatories ==
- Chahamanas of Naddula
- Chahamanas of Jalor
