= Chamundaraja (Chaulukya dynasty) =

King of Gujarat from 996 to 1008

King of Gujarat
- Reign: 996–1008
- Predecessor: Mularaja
- Successor: Vallabharaja
- Issue: Vallabharaja and Durlabharaja
- dynasty: Chaulukya (Solanki)
- Father: Mularaja

Chamundaraja (IAST: Cāmuṇḍarāja; r. 996–1008) was an Indian king who ruled parts of present-day Gujarat from his capital at Anahilapataka (modern Patan). He was a member of the Chaulukya (also called Chalukya or Solanki) dynasty.

== Early life ==
Cāmuṇḍarāja was the son of the Chaulukya king Mūlarāja. Inscriptions recording grants made by him as a prince are dated as early as 976, although he ascended the throne much later, sometime during 996–997.

== Military career ==
The Vastupāla-Tejaḥpāla praśasti includes conventional praise for Cāmuṇḍarāja, boasting that he decorated the earth with the heads of his enemies, but does not name any specific enemies. According to the 12th century Jain author Hemacandra, Cāmuṇḍarāja defeated the Lata Chalukya chief Bārapa, although other chroniclers attribute this victory to his father Mūlarāja. Therefore, it appears that Cāmuṇḍarāja participated in the war against Bārapa as a prince.

According to the 12th century Vādnagar praśasti inscription, a king named Sindhurāja fled with his elephant forces when he saw Cāmuṇḍarāja's army at a distance, thus losing his well-established fame. This king can be identified with Sindhurāja, the Paramāra king of Gujarat's neighbour Mālava. According to Sindhurāja's court poet Padmagupta, the Paramāra king defeated the rulers of Vāgaḍa and Lāṭa, which bordered Cāmuṇḍarāja's kingdom. It is possible that the ruler of Lāṭa was a vassal of Cāmuṇḍarāja at this time. Accordingly, Cāmuṇḍarāja came to the rescue of his vassal, forcing Sindhurāja to retreat. The 14th century Jain chronicler Jayasiṁha Sūri claims that Cāmuṇḍaraja killed Sindhurāja in a battle. However, this claim doesn't appear in the earlier sources, and therefore, cannot be taken literally.

The Cālukyas of Kalyani captured the Lāṭa region during Cāmuṇḍarāja's reign. The 1007 Lakkundi inscription mentions that the Kalyani Chalukya ruler Satyāśraya had returned from a successful campaign in the Gūrjara country. The Kalyani Chalukya poet Ranna also states that Satyāśraya defeated the Gūrjaras with an elephant force. One theory is that the "Gurjara" ruler defeated by Satyāśraya in this particular campaign was Cāmuṇḍarāja. However, there is no direct evidence to support this identification. It is possible that the ruler defeated by Satyāśraya was the Lata Chalukya ruler Bārapa or an obscure descendant of the Gūrjaras of Nāndīpurī.

== Personal life ==
Hemacandra states that Cāmuṇḍarāja had three sons: Durlabharāja, Nāgarāja, and Vallabharāja. Abhayatilaka Gaṇi, who wrote a commentary on Hemacandra's work in the 13th century, states that Cāmuṇḍarāja became licentious, because of which his sister Vācinidevī placed his son Vallabha on the throne. It is not clear how Vacinidevī became powerful enough to replace a ruling king with another.

According to Hemacandra, Cāmuṇḍarāja left for a pilgrimage to Varanasi (Banaras) after his retirement. During this journey, his royal umbrella was confiscated (presumably, by the ruler of a kingdom lying on the way; identified as Mālava by some later chroniclers). As a result, he returned to Gujarat, and asked Vallabha to avenge this insult. However, Vallabha died of smallpox during a march, and Durlabha became the new Caulukya king. Cāmuṇḍarāja then retired to Śuklatīrtha (modern Shuklatirth) on the banks of Narmada, where he died.

== Religion and temples ==
According to Someshvara's Surathotsava Mahakavya, his ancestor Lalla-sharman served as a priest (purohita) to Chamunda-raja.

Cāmuṇḍarāja built Canḍanātha and Vācineśvara temples in Anahilapataka (now Patan). The Vācineśvara temple was probably built for merit of his sister Vācinidevī.

Other extant temples attributed to the first quarter of 11th century include original Bhaḍeśvara Jain Temple (now completely rebuilt following 2001 Gujarat earthquake); Viṣṇu Temple at Sander village in Patan district; Akhāḍa Mahādeva temple at Vasai, and Viṣṇnu Temple at Khandosan, both in Vijapur Taluka of Mehsana district in Gujarat. Two pieces of parshwadevatas, of Uma-Maheshwara and Ganesha, from old Brahminical temple at Jhinjhuwada is recovered dated circa 1000.
