= Chalukyas of Lata =

Chalukyas of Lar Desha or Lata region

Chalukyas of Lata feudatories of Western Chalukya
- c. 970 CE–c. 1070 CE
- Find spots of the Lata Chalukya inscription
- Government: Monarchy
- History
  - Established: c. 970 CE
  - Disestablished: c. 1070 CE
Preceded by	Succeeded by
Western Chalukya	Chaulukya dynasty
- Today part of: India

The Chalukyas of Lata were an Indian dynasty, which ruled the Lata region of present-day Gujarat during 10th and 11th centuries. They ruled as feudatories of the Western Chalukyas in their early years, and were ultimately defeated by the Chaulukyas of Gujarat (Solankis).

== History ==
Barappa, the dynasty's first ruler, is identified as a general of the Western Chalukya king Tailapa II. He might have been made the governor of the Lata region by Tailapa. According to Merutunga's Prabandha-Chintamani, Barappa and the ruler of Sapadalaksha (the Chahamana king Vigraharaja II) once simultaneously attacked Gujarat. Mularaja, the Chaulukya king of Gujarat, asked the Sapadalaksha ruler not to attack him until he dealt with Barappa. He then defeated Barappa, which prompted the Sapadalaksha king to flee Gujarat. Since Merutunga was from Gujarat, this account may be biased. The Chahamana chroniclers claim that Vigraharaja defeated Mularaja, and marched up to Bhrigukachchha, where he constructed a temple dedicated to his family deity Ashapura. According to one theory, Vigraharaja II allied with Barappa, and helped him achieve independence.

According to Hemachandra's Dvyashraya Kavya, Mularaja's son Chamundaraja invaded Lata, and killed Barappa. Barappa's son Gogi-raja may have revived the family's rule in the Lata region. But, by 1074 CE, the dynasty appears to have been vanquished by the Chaulukyas of Gujarat.

== Genealogy ==
The following members of the family (with estimated reigns) are known:

- Nimbarka
- Barappa, c. 970-990 CE
- Gogi-raja or Gongi-raja, c. 990-1010 CE
- Kirti-raja, c. 1010-1030 CE
- Vatsa-raja, c. 1030-1050 CE
- Trilochana-pala, c. 1050-1070 CE

== Inscriptions ==
A 940 Shaka (1018 CE) copper-plate inscription of Kirtiraja was discovered in Surat. It names his ancestors as Gogi, Barappa and Nimbarka.

Two copper-plate inscriptions of Trilochana-pala dated 972 Shaka (1050 CE Eklahare and 1051 CE Surat) have also been discovered. These inscriptions given an account of the mythical origin of the Chalukyas: the family's progenitor originated from the chuluka (a vessel or a folded palm to hold water) of the creator deity Virinchi. On the deity's advice, he married the Rashtrakuta princess of Kanyakubja. Trilochanapala's inscriptions mention four of his ancestors: Vatsa, Kirti, Gogi and Barappa. Vatsa is said to have built a golden umbrella for the god Somanatha, and also established a free food canteen (sattra). Trilochanapala is titled Maha-Mandaleshvara in these inscriptions. The 1050 CE inscription records his donation of the Ekallahara village (modern Eklahare) to a Brahmin named Taraditya.
