= Konkana kingdom =

Konkana was a southern kingdom populated by Brahmins during and after the period of Puranas. This kingdom is identified as the Konkan region (coastal region) of Maharashtra. Other such Brahmin populated kingdoms includes Dravida, Andhra and Karnata. Over time, these Brahmins migrated southward as far as Kerala.

The name Konkana probably have originated from the older name Kanwa-gana (meaning the clan of Kanwa) a clan of Bhrahmins. Kanwas were a sub-clan of the Kasyapa-clan of Brahmins. They arrived at the western shores of Indian peninsula, which were the stronghold of the Bhargava clan of Bhrahmins. This history is hidden in the myth of Vamana who arrived at the sacrifice of king Mahabali, conducted in the land of the Bhrigus (Bhrigu-kaksha (Bharuch in Gujarat), on the banks of river Narmada. This sacrifice was officiated by king Mahabali's priest named Sukra, who belonged to the Bhagava clan. In spite of the protest of priest Sukra, king Mahabali gave some land for Vamana. Starting with Vamana, many Kasyapas, in large numbers, settled in the kingdom of Mahabali. Their settlements outnumbered those of Bhargavas and of the ruling clan of Asuras. Thus Mahabali lost his kingdom and was forgotten into the underworld of memories. (See also Keralas).

== References in Mahabharata ==
Konkana is not mentioned in Mahabharata. Thus it is obviously a later-period province. However, the epic mentions Kanwa, the founder (or a member ?) of the Kanwa clan. Sage Kanwa of the race of Kasyapa is mentioned at (1,70). He was the foster-father of Sakuntala the wife of the famous Puru king Dushyanta (Dushmanta). Kanwa raised Sakuntala as her own daughter in his asylum.

- A tribe called Konwasiras is mentioned at (13,35)

== See also ==
- Kingdoms of Ancient India
- Surparaka kingdom
- Gomanta kingdom
