= Lata (region) =

Ancient Indian region known as Lār-deśa or Larike

Lata (IAST: Lāṭa) was a historical region of India, located in the southern part of the present-day Gujarat state.

Lata is identified as the area between Mahi River in the north and Narmada or Tapi River in south. Bharuch is a major city and former capital of the region. (marked here in modern day Gujarat state).

== Location and extent ==
Shakti-Sangam-Tantra, a Shakt sampradaya text composed before 7th century CE, states that Lata was located to the west of Avanti (India) and to the north-west of Vidarbha.

According to Tej Ram Sharma, Lata's northern boundary was formed by the Mahi River, or at times, by the Narmada River. In the south, Lata extended up to the Purna River, and at times, up to Daman. It included Surat, Bharuch, Kheda and Vadodara.

According to Georg Bühler, Lata was the area between Mahi River and Kim River, and its major city was Bharuch.

== Historical mentions ==
The Lata region is not mentioned in the earliest of the Puranas or the Sanskrit epics. The earliest mention of the region probably comes from the writings of the 2nd century Greco-Egyptian writer Ptolemy. The Larike mentioned by him is identified with Lata by multiple scholars including H. D. Sankalia and D. C. Sircar, The Greek name might have derived from Lār-deśa ("Lār country"), the Prakrit form of Lāṭa. Ptolemy mentions that the delta of the river Mophis (identified with Mahi) and Barygaza (Bharuch) were located in Larike. Vatsayayana in his Kama Sutra of the third century calls it Láṭa; describes it as situated to the west of Malwa; and gives an account of several of the customs of its people.

In Sanskrit writings and inscriptions later than the third century, the name is frequently found. In the sixth century, the astronomer Varahamihira mentions the country of Láṭa, and the name also appears as Láṭa in an Ajanta and in a Mandasor inscription of the fifth century. It is common in the later inscriptions (700–1200 CE) of the Chaulukya, Gurjara and Ráshṭrakúṭa kings as well as in the writings of Arab travellers and historians between the eighth and twelfth centuries. Dipavamsa and Mahavamsa mention that Prince Vijaya came from the Sinhapura city in the Lala or Lada region. This region is variously identified as Lata in Gujarat or Rarh in Bengal.

In the Gupta-era records, Lata is mentioned as a vishaya (IAST: viṣaya) or district. The Lāṭa-viṣaya was well-known until the 8th century.

The Latesvara country mentioned in some early Gurjara-Pratihara and Rashtrakuta records is probably same as Lata.

The Chalukyas of Lata ruled the region during the 10th and 11th centuries.
