= GMERS Medical College and Hospital, Dharpur-Patan =

Medical college in Gujarat

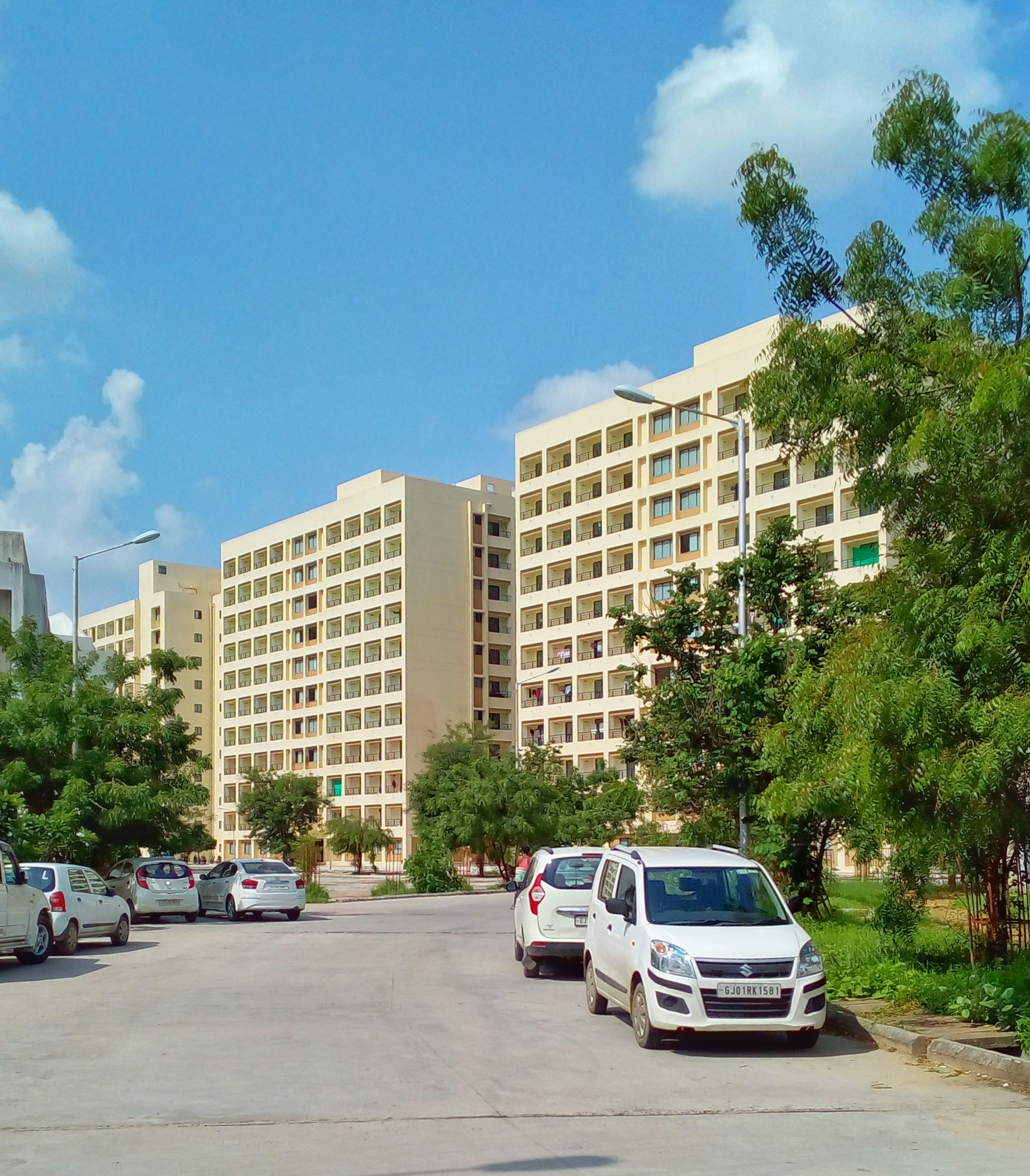
- Type: Medical College and Hospital
- Established: 2012; 14 years ago
- Affiliations: Hemchandracharya North Gujarat University
- Dean: Dr. Hardik V. Shah
- Location: Patan, Gujarat, India
- Website: https://gmersmchpatan.org/

GMERS Medical College and Hospital, Dharpur-Patan is a medical college situated in Patan, Gujarat. The college imparts the degree Bachelor of Medicine and Surgery (MBBS). Nursing and para-medical courses are also offered. The college is affiliated to Hemchandracharya North Gujarat University and is recognized by Medical Council of India. The hospital associated with the college is one of the largest hospitals in the Patan. The selection of the college is done on the basis of merit through National Eligibility and Entrance Test. Yearly undergraduate student intake is 200.

== Courses ==
GMERS Medical College and Hospital, Dharpur-Patan undertakes education and training of students MBBS courses. This college is offering 200 MBBS seats from 2019 of which 85% Seats are of state quota and 15% is for Nation Counselling.
