= Rani ki Vav =

UNESCO World Heritage Site in Patan, India

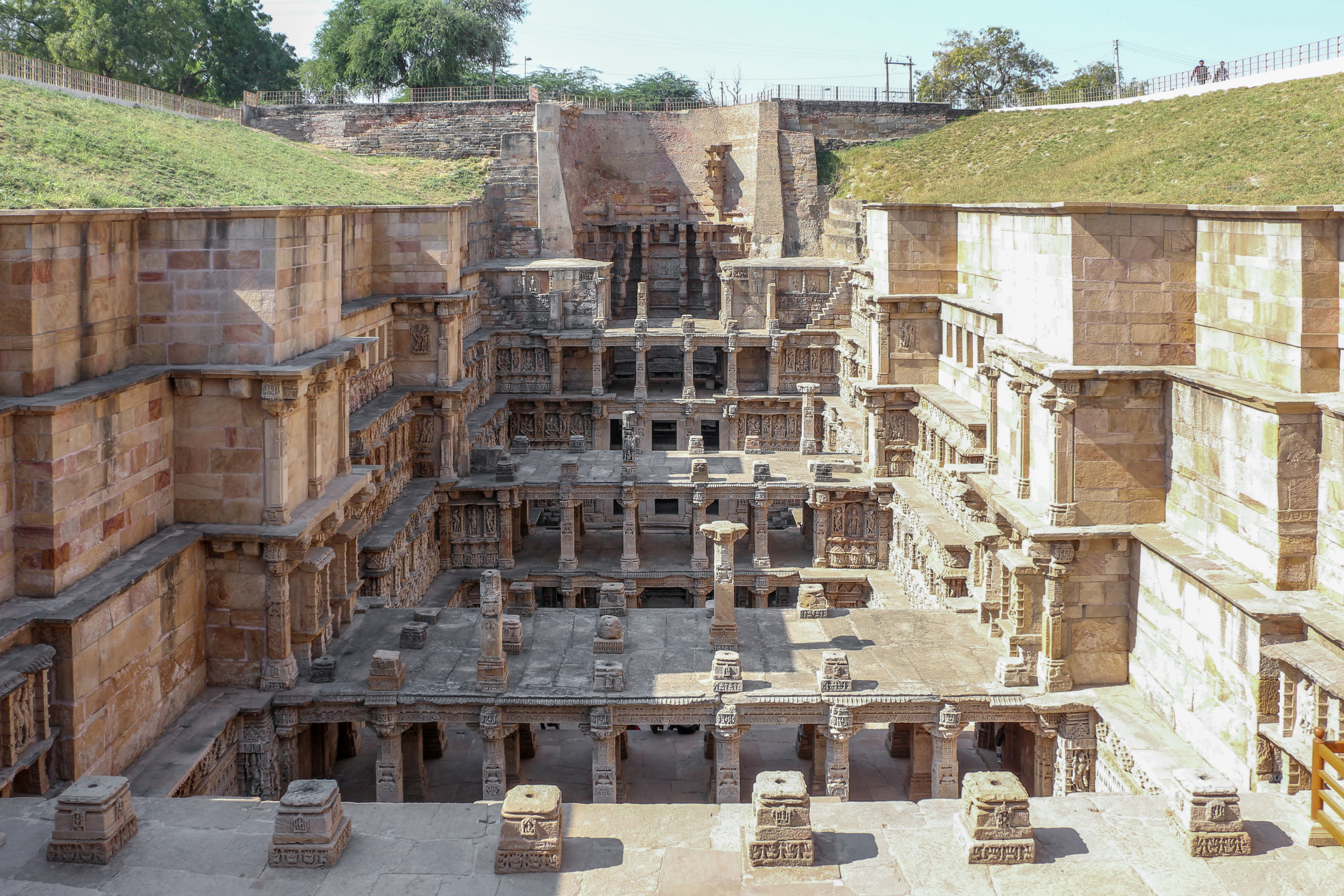

- Location in Gujarat Location in India
- 23°51′32″N 72°6′6″E
- Location: Patan, Gujarat, India

Site notes
- Area: 4.68 ha (11.6 acres)

UNESCO World Heritage Site
- Criteria: Cultural: (i), (iv)
- Reference: 922
- Inscription: 2014 (38th Session)
- Buffer zone: 125.44 ha (310.0 acres)

Rani ki Vav (lit. 'The Queen's Stepwell') is a stepwell situated in the town of Patan in Gujarat, India. It is located on the banks of the Saraswati River. Its construction is attributed to Udayamati, the Wife of the 11th-century Chaulukya king Bhima I and the daughter of Ra Khengar from Junagadh (Sorath). Silted over, it was rediscovered in the 1940s and restored in the 1980s by the Archaeological Survey of India. It has been listed as a UNESCO World Heritage Sites in India since 2014. The stepwell is designed as an underground shrine or inverted temple symbolizing the sanctity of water, with sculptures depicting numerous Hindu deities. It is divided into seven stair levels, each with sculptural panels. These panels contain more than 500 principal sculptures and over a thousand minor ones, combining religious, secular, and symbolic imagery.

== History ==
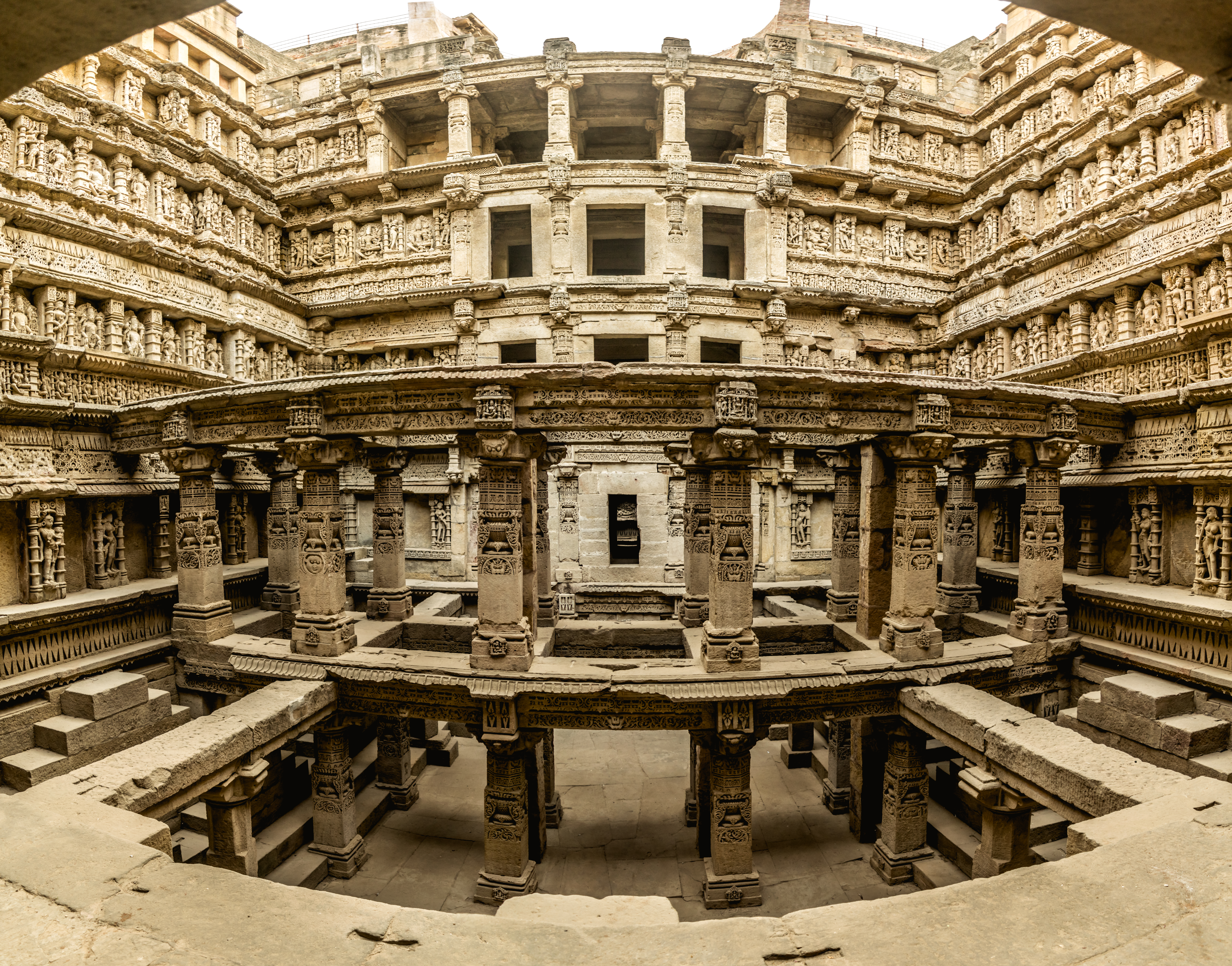
Inside Rani ki Vav

Rani ki Vav was constructed during the rule of the Chaulukya dynasty. It is located on the banks of the Saraswati River. The city was sacked by Sultan of Delhi Qutb-ud-din Aibak between 1200 and 1210, and again by Allauddin Khilji in 1298.

Prabandha-Chintamani, composed by the Jain monk Merutunga in 1304, mentions: "Udayamati, the daughter of Naravaraha Khengara, built this novel stepwell at Shripattana (Patan) surpassing the glory of the Sahasralinga Tank". According to it, the stepwell was commissioned in 1063 and was completed after 20 years. It is generally assumed that it was built in the memory of Bhima I (r. c. 1022 – 1064) by his queen Udayamati and probably completed by Udayamati and Karna after his death, but whether she was a dowager when she commissioned it is disputed. Commissariat puts the date of construction to 1032 based on the architectural similarity to Vimalavasahi temple on Mount Abu, built in the same year.

The stepwell was later flooded by the Saraswati River and silted over. In the 1890s, Henry Cousens and James Burgess visited it when it was completely buried underground.. Only the well shaft and a few pillars were visible. They described it as being a huge pit measuring 87 metres (285 ft). In Travels in Western India, James Tod mentioned that the material from the stepwell was reused in the other stepwell built in modern Patan, probably Trikam Barot ni Vav (Bahadur Singh stepwell). In the 1940s, excavations carried out under the Baroda State revealed the stepwell. In 1986, a major excavation and restoration was carried out by the Archaeological Survey of India (ASI). An image of Udayamati was also recovered during the excavation. The restoration was carried out between 1981 and 1987.

Rani ki Vav has been declared a Monument of National Importance and protected by the ASI. It was added to the list of UNESCO World Heritage Sites in India on 22 June 2014. It was named India's "Cleanest Iconic Place" at the 2016 Indian Sanitation Conference.

== Architecture ==
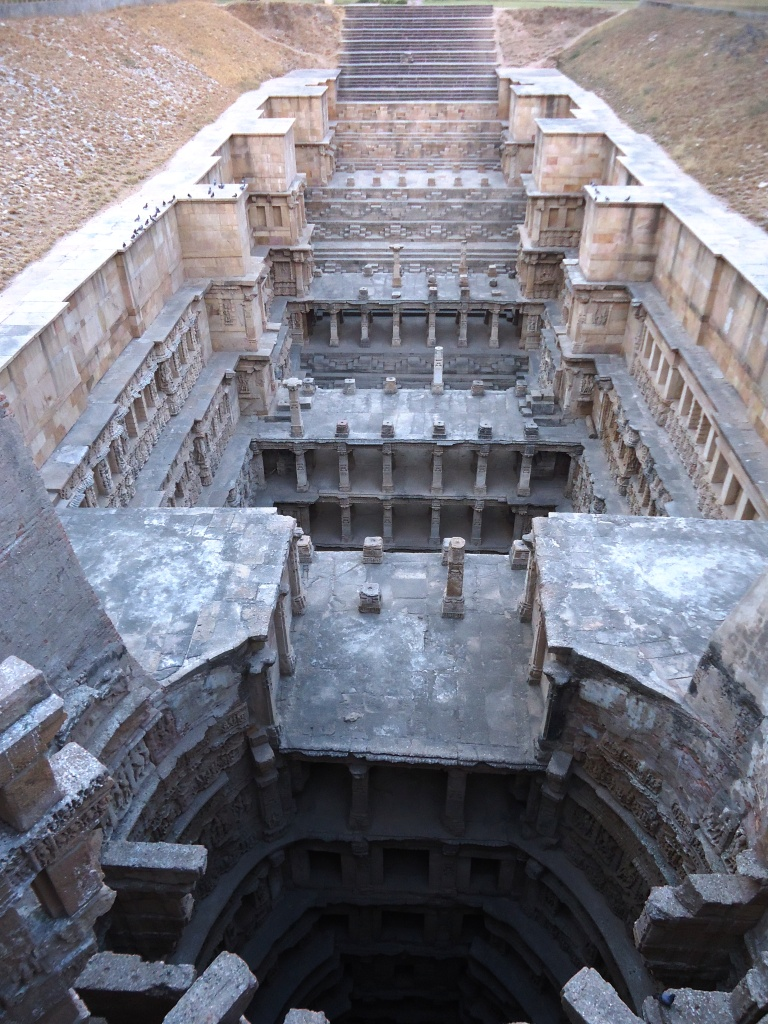
Rani ki Vav, view from the top

Rani ki vav is considered to be one of the finest and largest examples of stepwell architecture in Gujarat. It was built at the height of artisans’ expertise in stepwell construction and in the Maru-Gurjara architecture style, reflecting mastery of this complex technique and the beauty of its detail and proportions. The architecture and sculptures are similar to the Vimalavasahi temple on Mount Abu and Sun temple at Modhera.

Following medieval texts such as the Aparājitapṛcchā, Rani ki Vav is classified as a Nanda stepwell, defined as having a single entrance (eka-vaktra) and three pavilion towers. It represents a variation of the Nanda class, incorporating lateral staircases within its straight stepped corridor. These lateral flights shorten the overall corridor length and provide direct access to the lower levels. It measures approximately 65 metres (213 ft) long, 20 metres (66 ft) wide and 28 metres (92 ft) deep. The fourth level is the deepest and leads into a rectangular tank 9.5 metres (31 ft) by 9.4 metres (31 ft), at a depth of 23 metres (75 ft). The entrance is located in the east, while the well is located at the westernmost end and consists of a shaft 10 metres (33 ft) in diameter and 30 metres (98 ft) deep. The stepwell is divided into seven levels of stairs, which lead down to a deep, circular well. A stepped corridor is compartmentalized at regular intervals with pillared, multistorey pavilions. The walls, pillars, columns, brackets, and beams are ornamented with carvings and scrollwork. The niches in the side walls are ornamented with delicate figures and sculptures. There are 212 pillars in the stepwell.

The structural framework of Rani ki Vav uses an interlocked post-and-beam system composed of pillars, columns, walls, brackets and beams designed to manage vertical weight loads and lateral soil pressure. Constructed from medium-to-coarse-grained sedimentary sandstone, the freestanding and engaged pillars of the multistoried mandapa (pavilions) are arranged in a trabeated format. These pillars display elements of the Māru-Gurjara architectural style, such as carved ghata-pallava (vase-and-foliage) motifs, bhadraka shafts, and purna-ghata capitals, integrating load-bearing supports into the stepwell's decorative design. The columns, horizontal lintels, and beams form a three-dimensional frame with interlocked joints intended to absorb seismic movement. To withstand soil pressure against the deep side retaining walls, horizontal bracing beams measuring 2 metres (6.6 ft) span the 20 metres (66 ft) wide stepwell, supported by the vertically stacked pavilion structures built into the embankments. The design also incorporates decorated brackets, corbelled column capitals, and sculpted wall niches throughout the corridor and well shaft.

The structural design of Rani ki Vav divides its large architectural volume into smaller, defined spaces through a network of horizontal roofs and vertical columns. This arrangement, known as a 3D tartan pattern, reduces the linear dominance of the shaft and filters direct sunlight. The structural layout influences the subterranean climate of the stepwell. Warm surface air enters the cavity and cools upon contact with the stone masonry and water, creating a dense, humid layer of air that reduces internal temperatures and limits water evaporation.

=== Sculptures ===
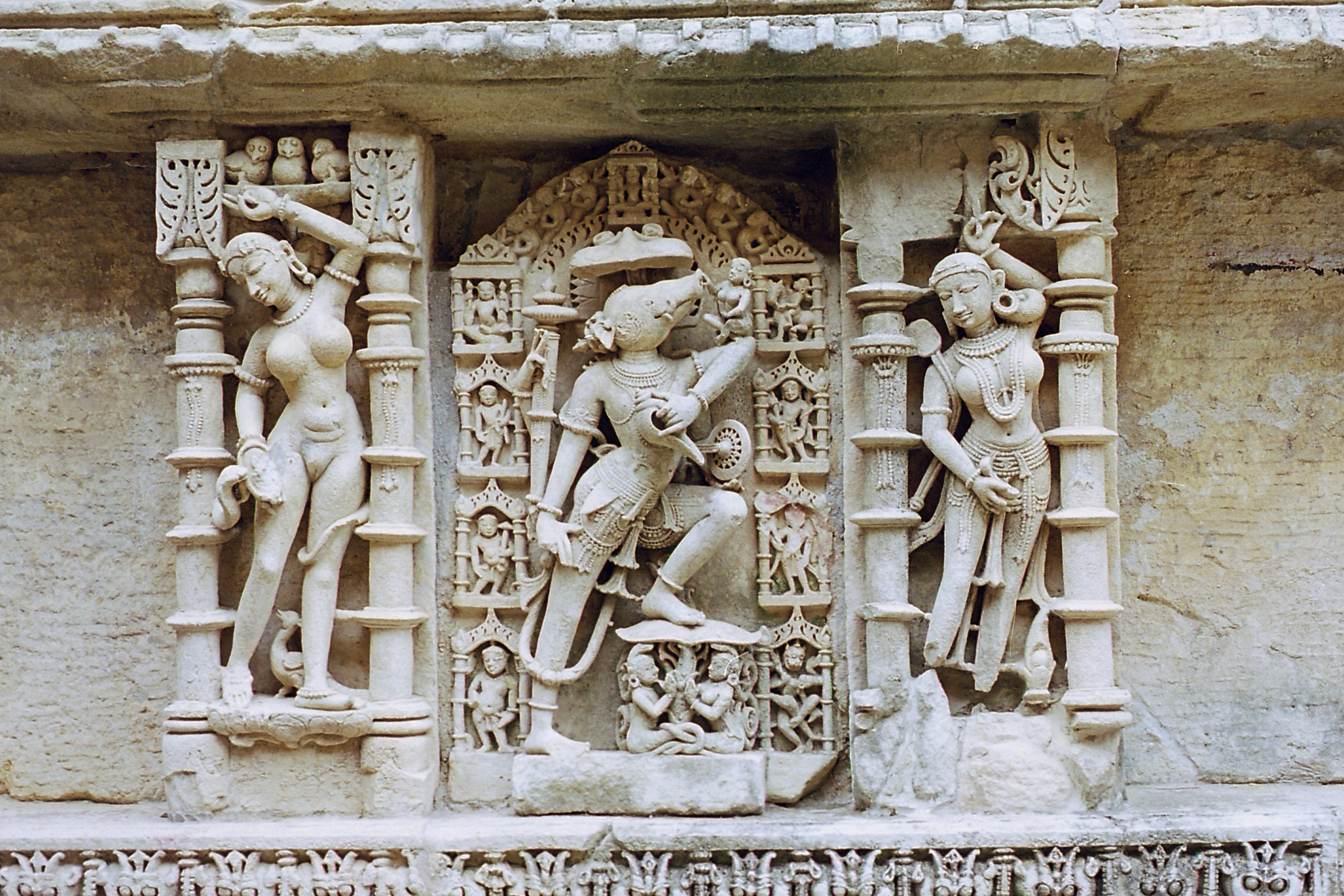
Varaha (centre), woman with snake (left)

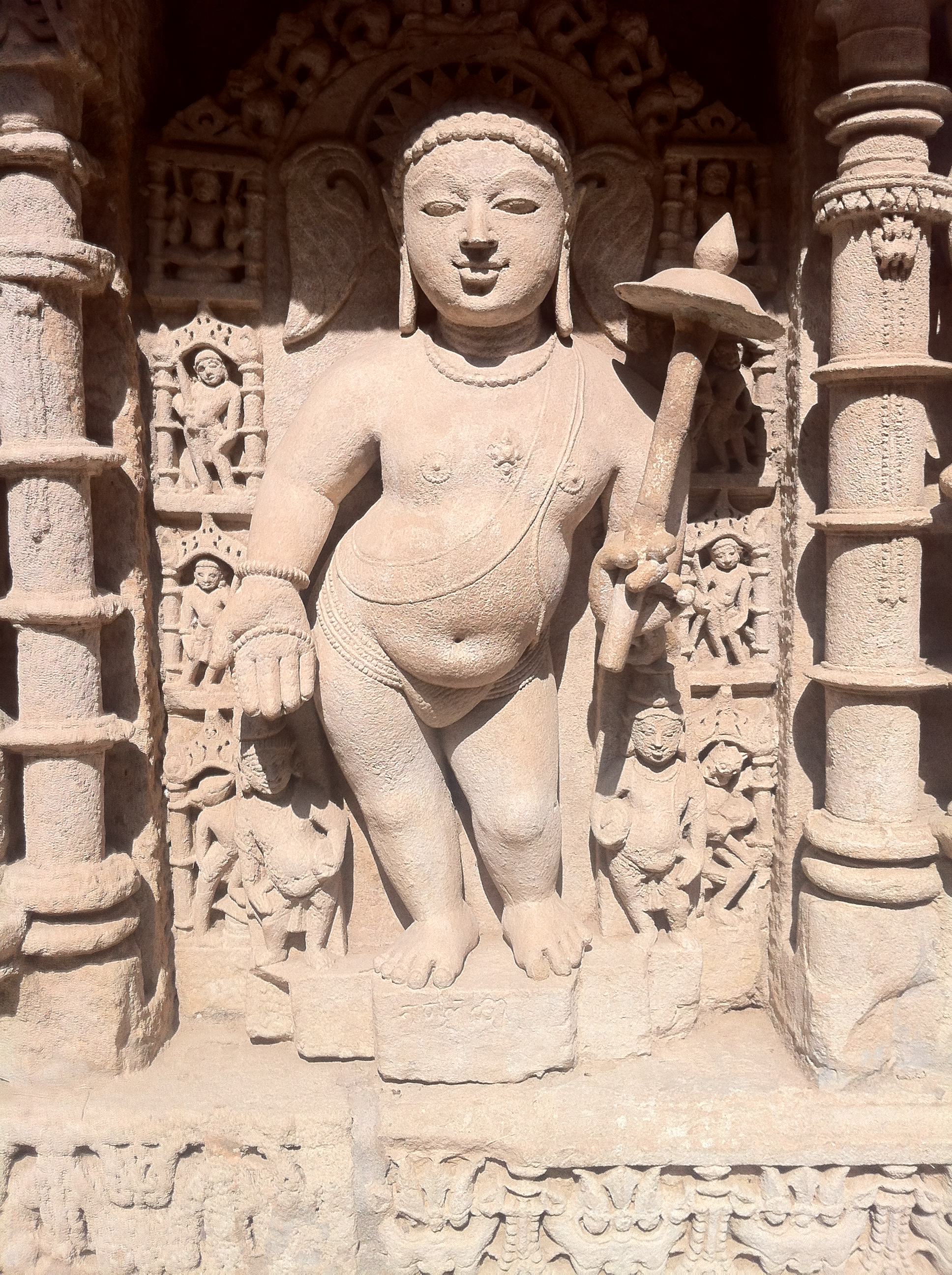
Vamana incarnation

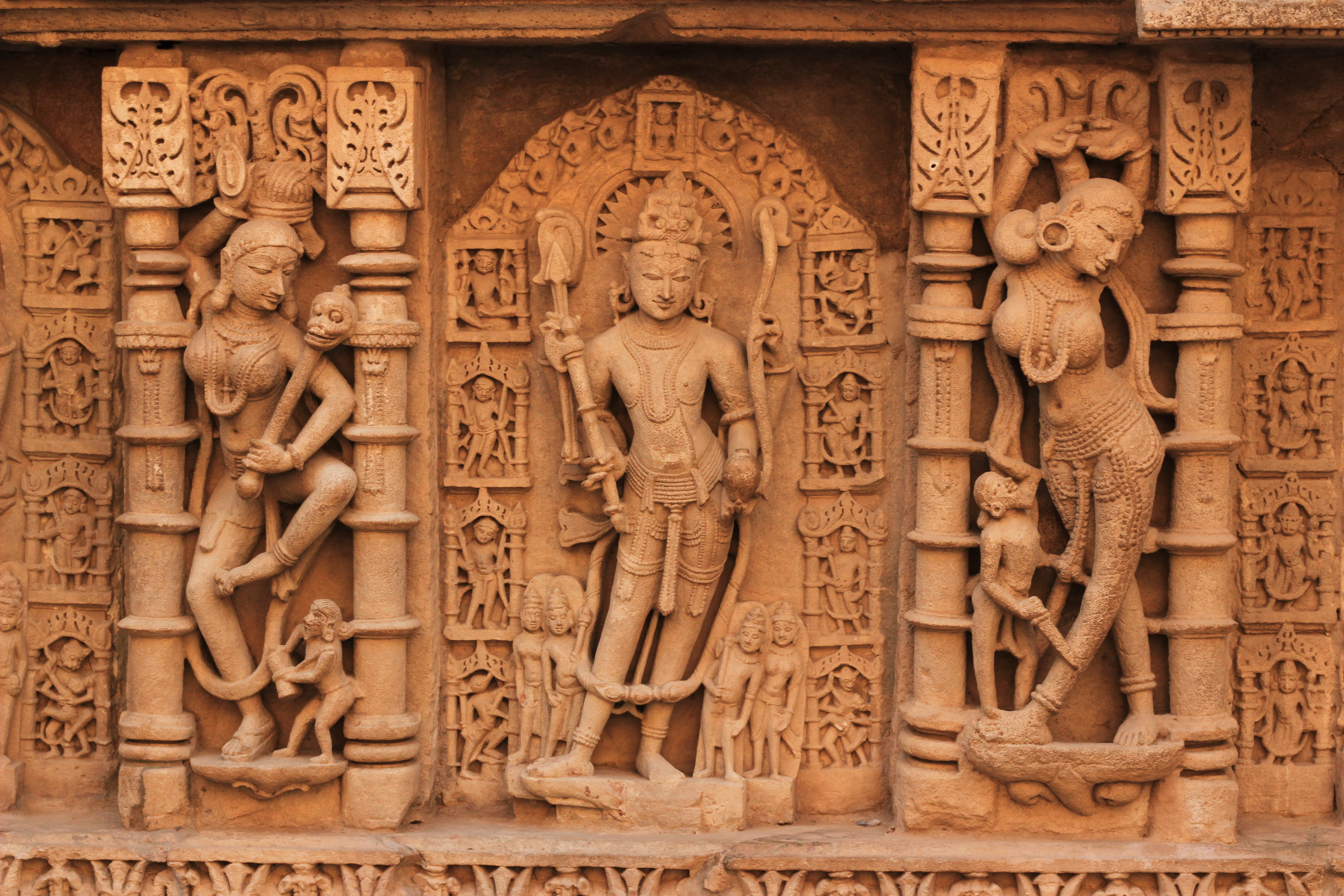
Parashurama in the centre

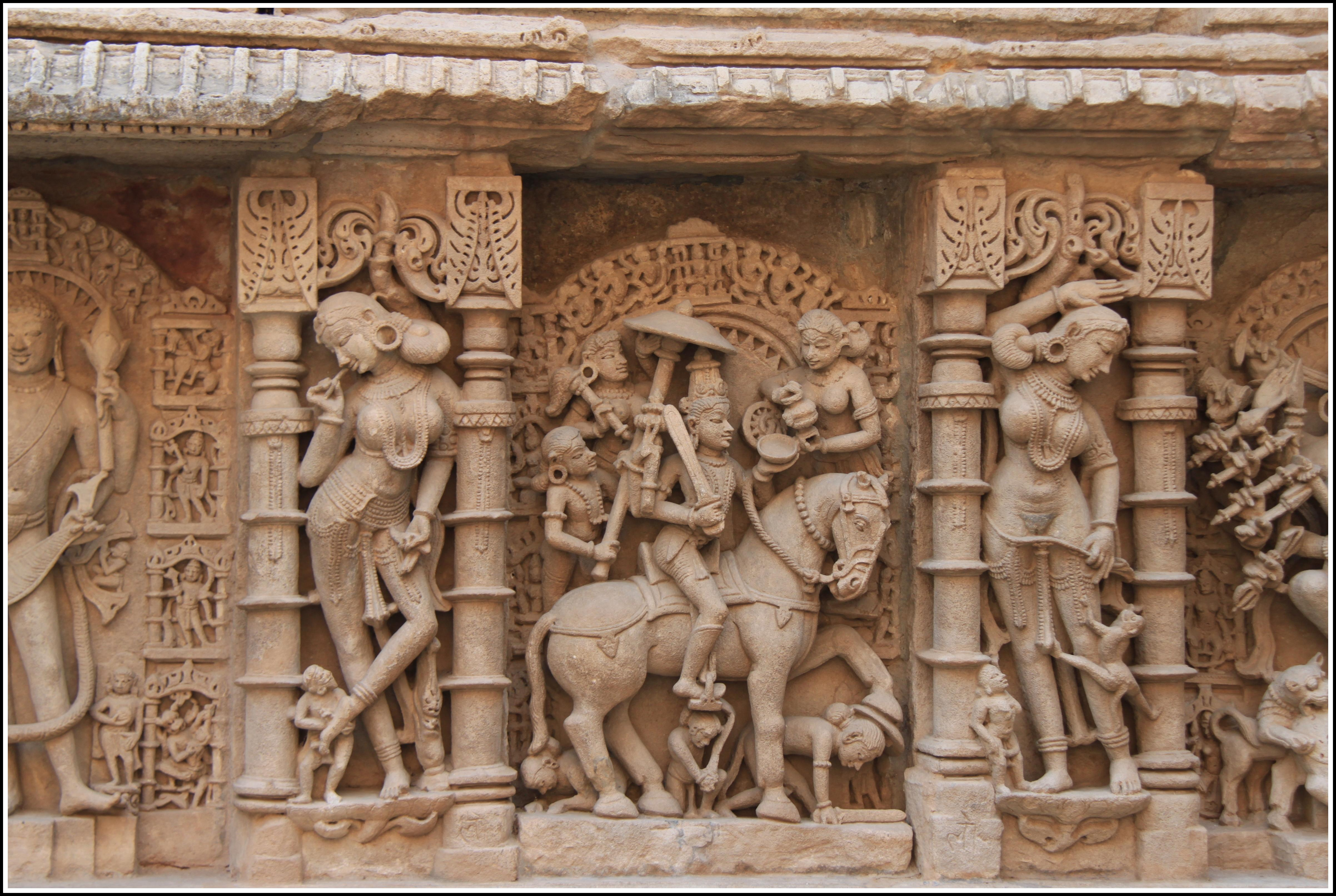
Kalki incarnation (centre), women with lipstick or twig (left), and with monkey (right)

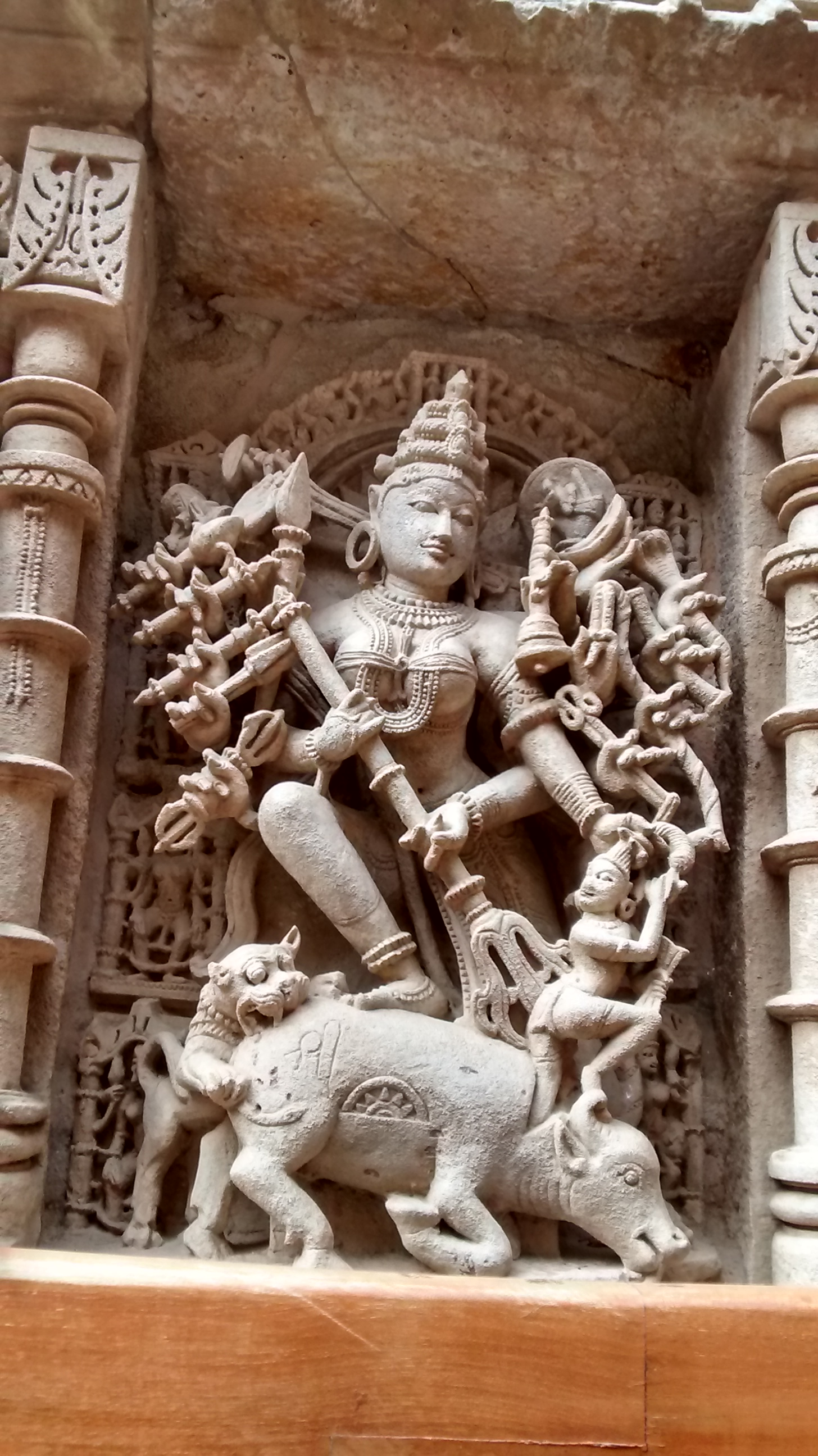
Durga killing Mahishasura

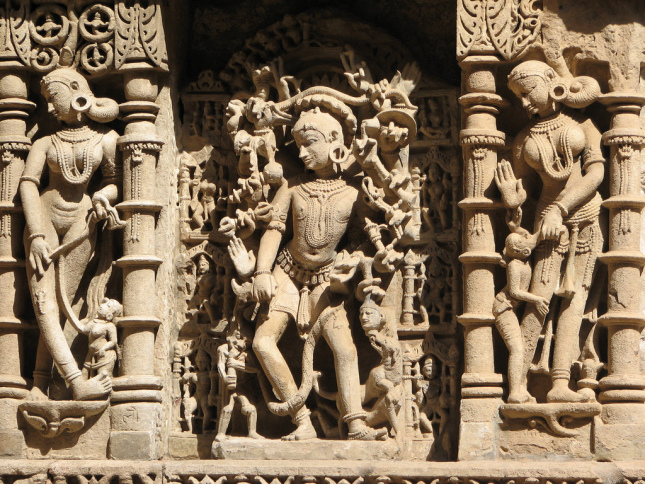
Bhairava and Apsaras

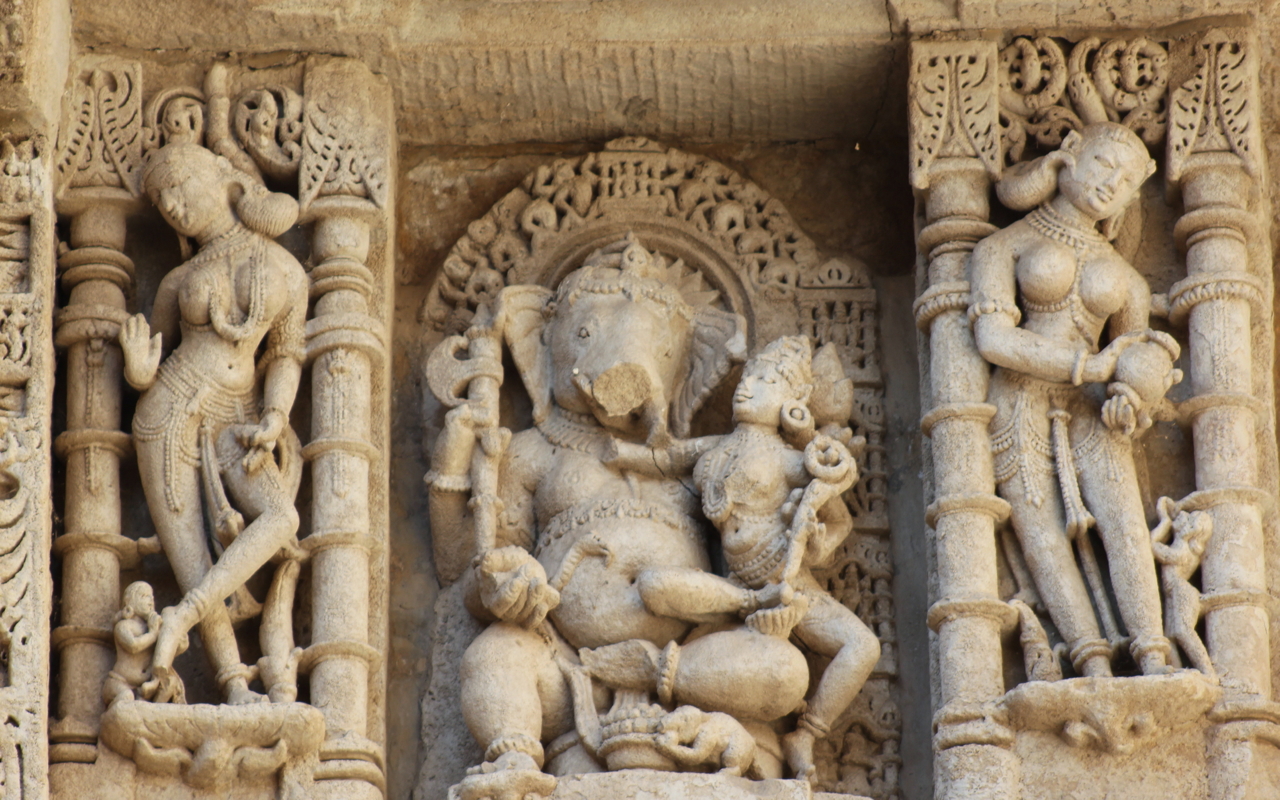
Ganesha with his consort and Apsaras

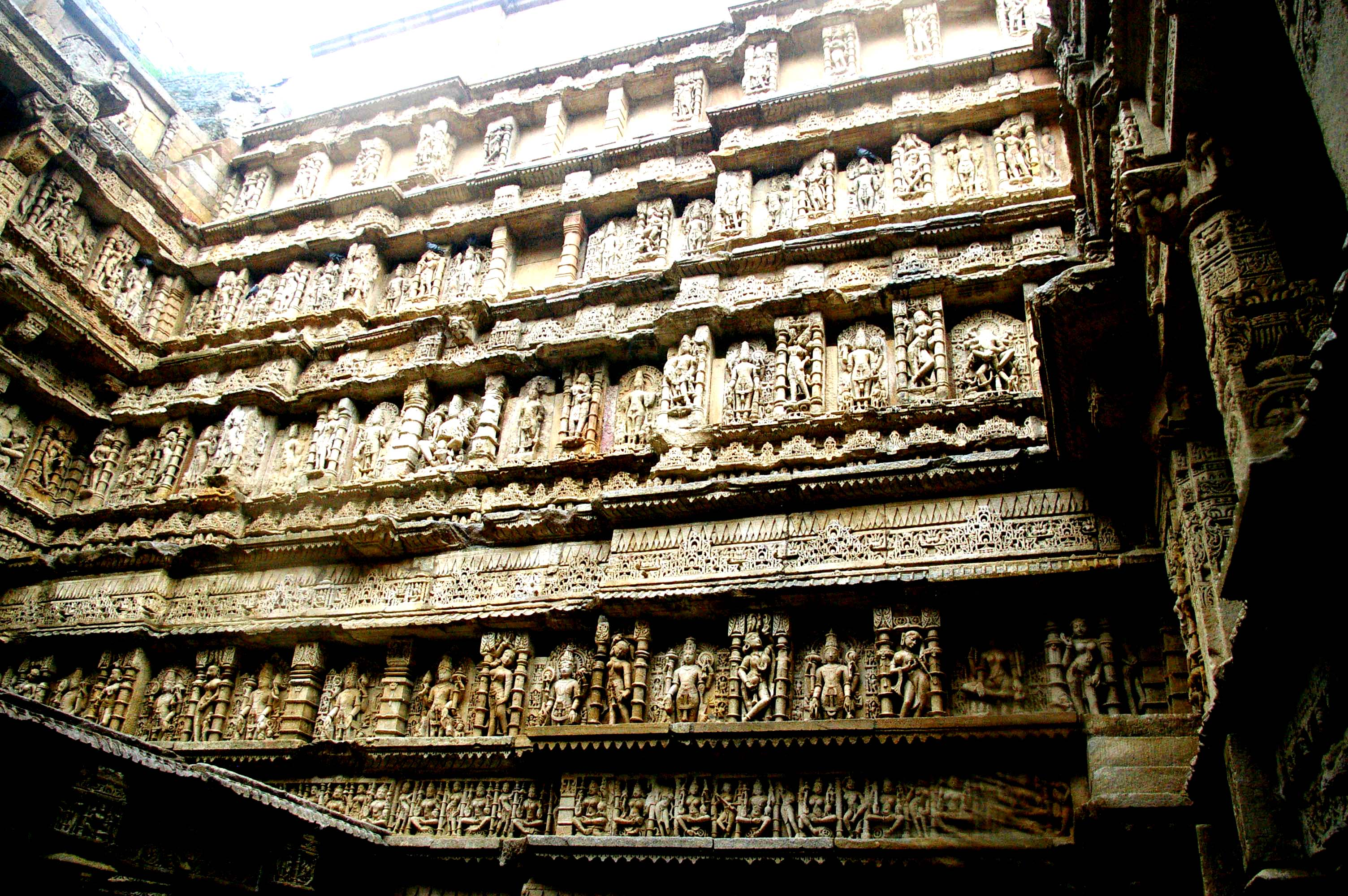
Wall with sculptural panels

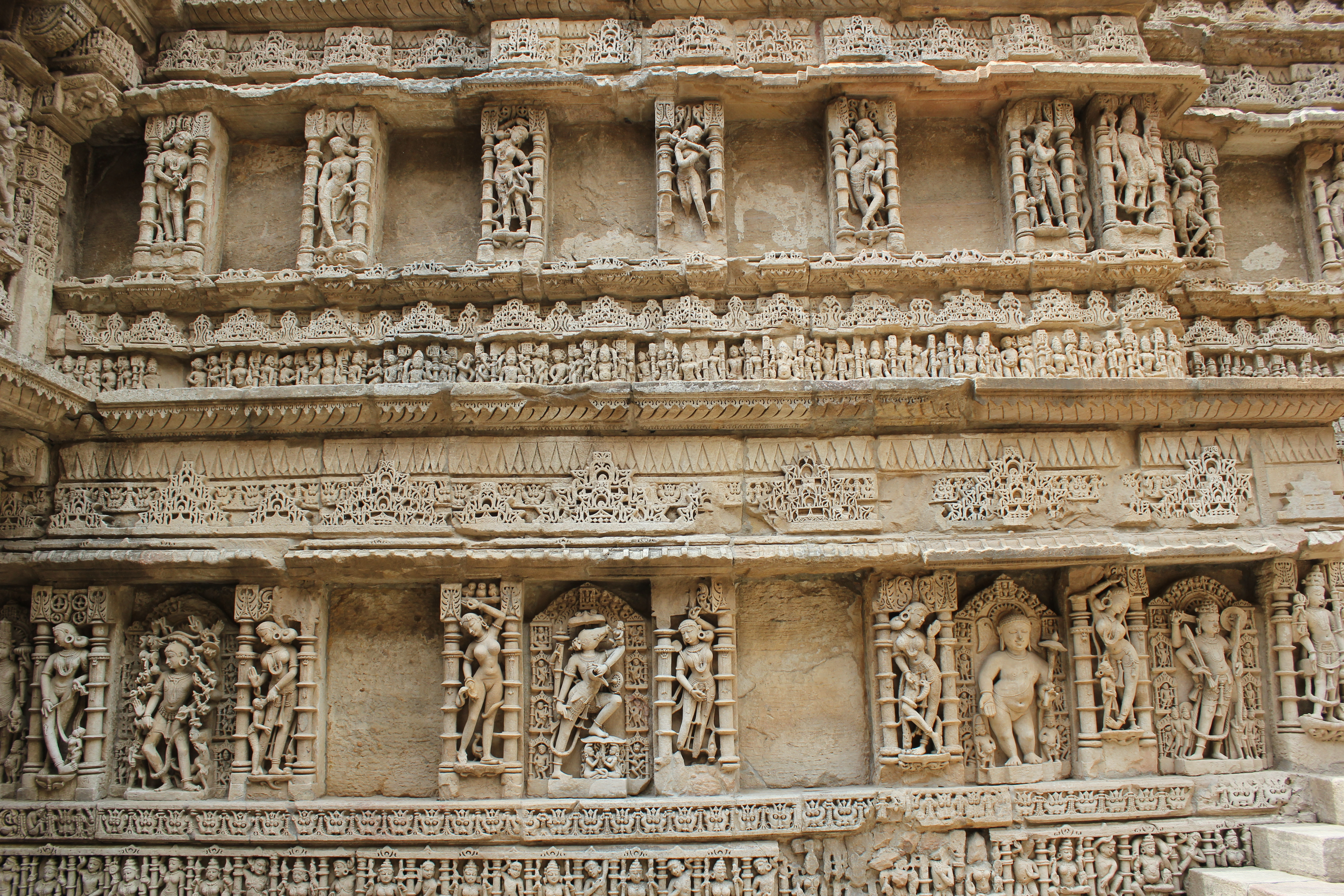
Wall with sculptural panels

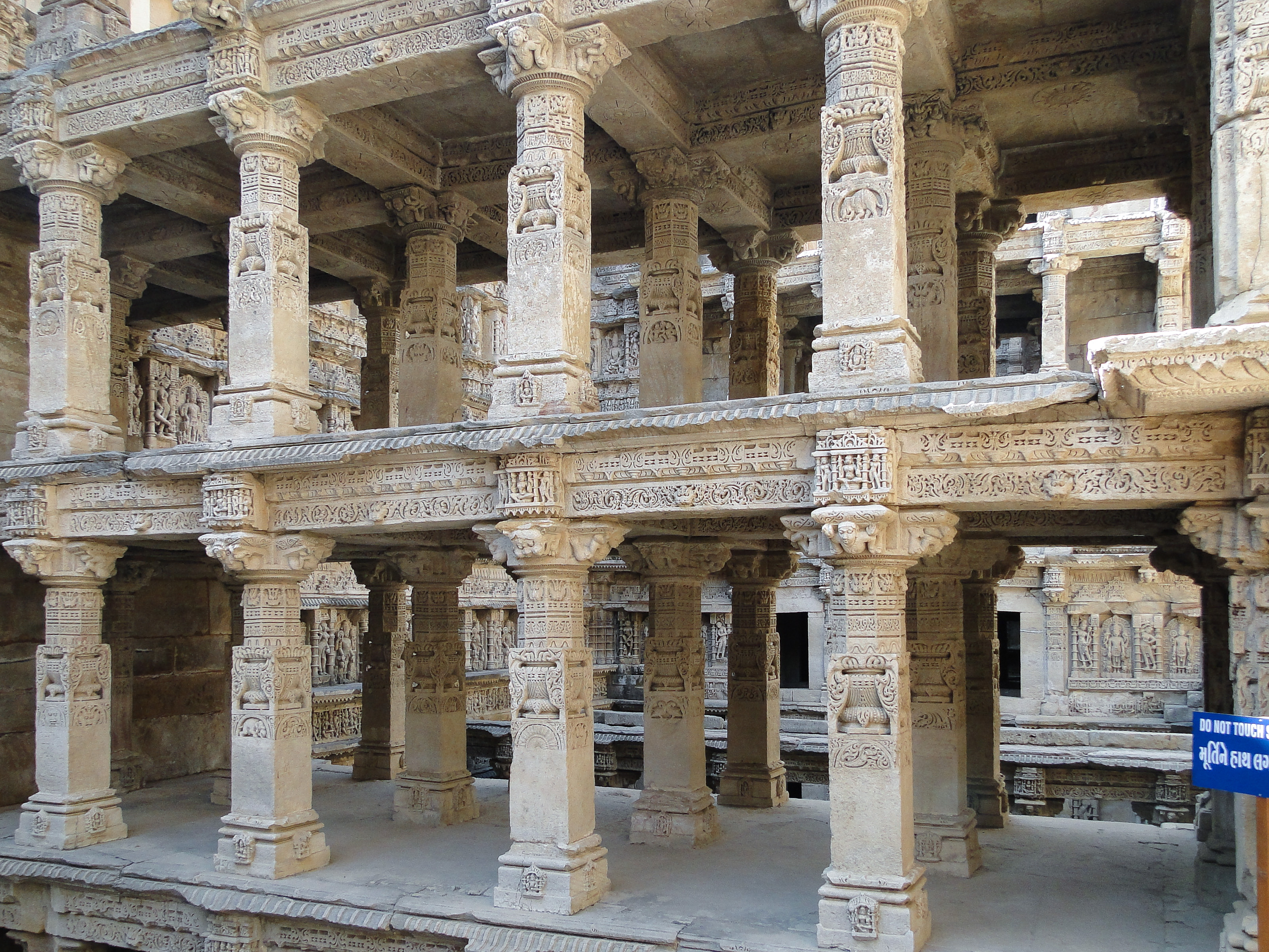
Carved pillars

There are more than 500 principal sculptures and over a thousand minor ones, often referencing literary works in combination with religious, symbolic, and secular imagery. The ornamentation of the stepwell depicts the entire universe inhabited by gods and goddesses, celestial beings, men and women, monks, priests, and laity; animals, fish, and birds, including seen and unseen ones, as well as plants and trees.

The stepwell is designed as an underground shrine or inverted temple, symbolizing the sanctity of water. Sculptures in the stepwell depict numerous Hindu deities. These include gods such as Brahma, Vishnu, Shiva, Ganesha, Kubera, Lakulisha, Bhairava, Surya, Indra and Hayagriva and goddesses like Lakshmi, Parvati, Saraswati, Chamunda, Kshemankari, Suryani, the Saptamatrikas and Durga (as Mahishasurmardini). The sculptures associated with Vishnu outnumber all other deities, and include Sheshashayi Vishnu (Vishnu reclining on the thousand-hooded snake Shesha in the celestial ocean), Vishwarupa Vishnu (Cosmic form of Vishnu) and the Dashavatara (ten incarnations) of Vishnu. Other sculptures include families of deities such as Brahma-Savitri, Uma-Maheshwar and Lakshmi-Narayan. Notable among other sculptures are Ardhanarishwara (Shiva and Parvati in a combined, androgynous form) and a group of Navagraha (the nine planets) as well.

There are a large number of celestial beings (Apsaras). One sculpture of an Apsara depicts her either applying lip paint or chewing on an aromatic twig, while a man attends to her feet. On the northern side of the third-story pavilion, there is a sculpture of an Apsara warding off a monkey clinging to her leg. At her feet, there is a nude female with a snake around her neck. There are also sculptures of Nagkanya (a serpent princess) with long hair and a swan, as well as depictions of celestial dancers in classical dance positions.

There are numerous sculptures depicting women in their everyday lives and activities. One sculpture depicts a woman combing her hair, adjusting her earring, and looking at herself in the mirror. Other sculptures include a woman writing a letter; a young woman with a scorpion climbing her right leg and her clothes sliding off; a young woman pulling the beard of a dwarf-like man; and a woman holding a plate of fish, with a snake encircling her leg and reaching toward the fish. One sculpture depicts a young woman emerging from her bath with wet hair, while a swan catches droplets falling from her hair like pearls. The women in these sculptures are adorned with jewelry, including bangles, earrings, necklaces, waist girdles, anklets, and elegant clothing, as well as well-combed hair. A variety of expressions and emotions are depicted in them, representing beauty and love in their sublime and seductive forms. There are sculptures representing maternal love, such as a woman holding her child and pointing to the moon to divert his attention, a woman raising her child high to let him pick a mango from a tree, and a woman in a mango grove accompanied by children.

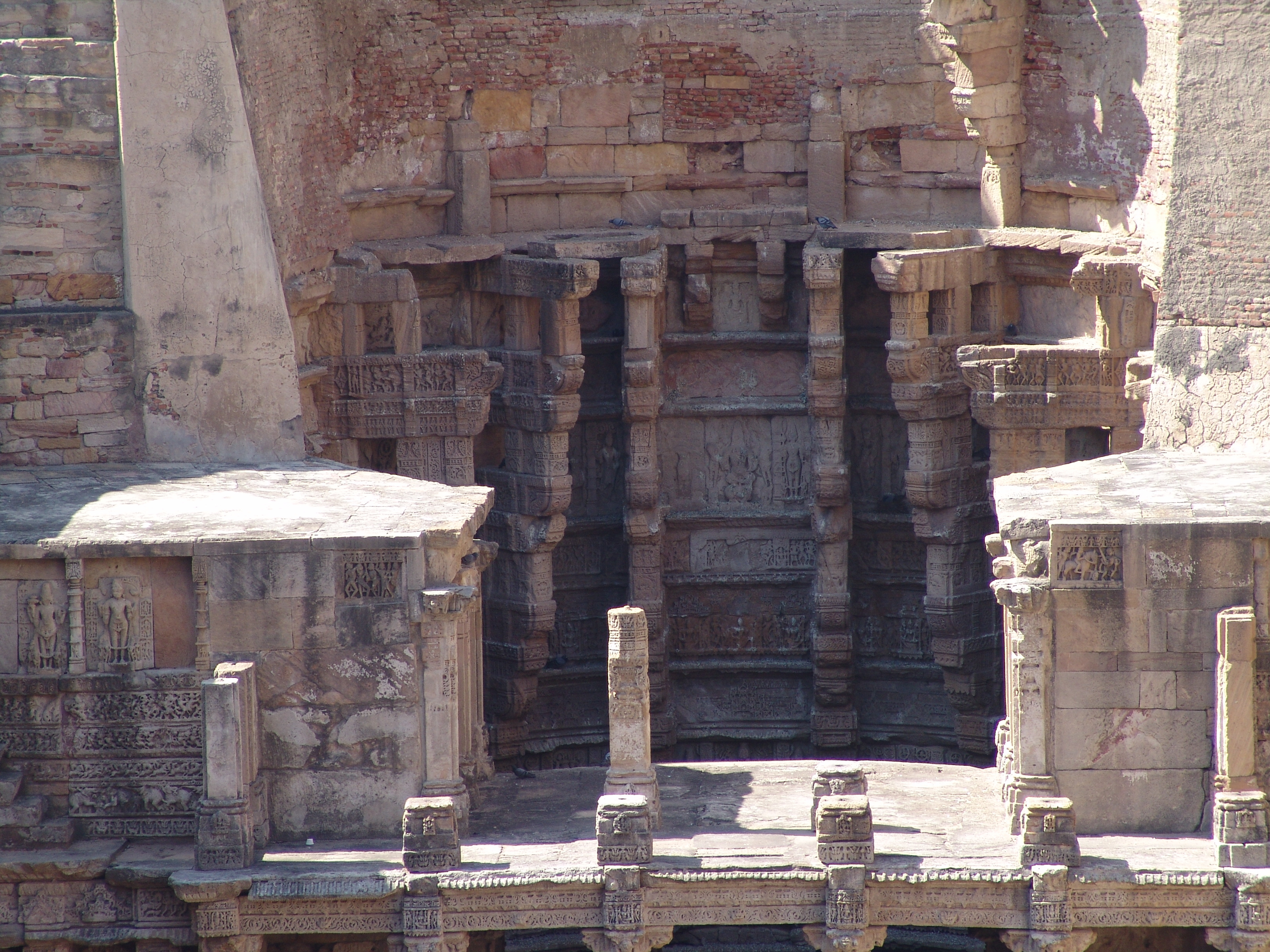
Cantilevered brackets in well shaft

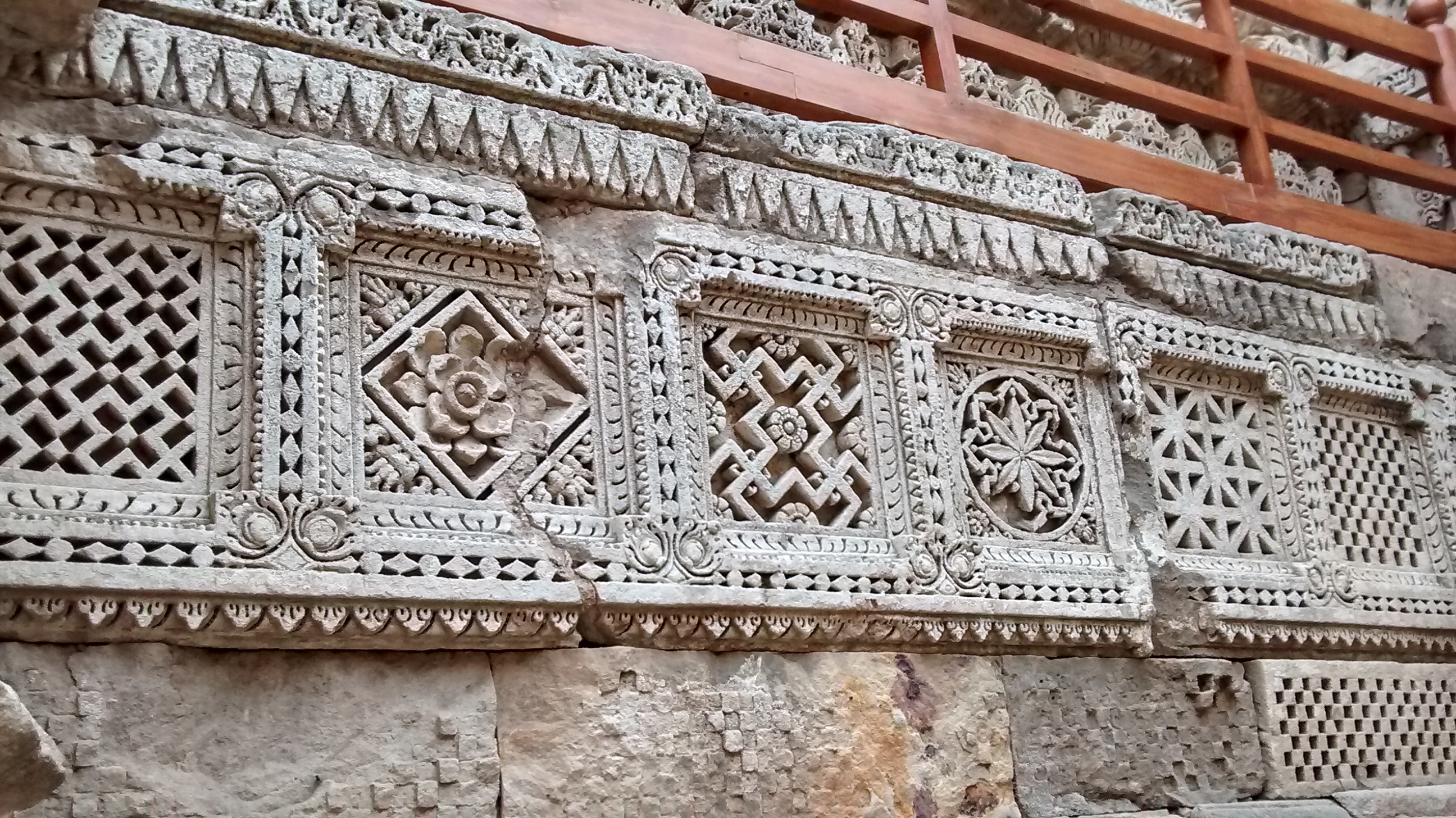
Geometric lattice patterns and designs resembling Patola textile designs

There are gradually increasing cantilevered brackets in the well shaft, which are profusely ornamented. Kalpavriksha carvings on the wall represent fertility and nature worship, while kirtimukhas and makaras adorn the basements and capitals of pillars. There are latticework patterns and designs resembling local, geometric textile designs, and traditional Patola designs are featured on the wall at the stepwell's northern entrance. These may have been adapted from wood carvings and temple ceilings. Figures of horses, elephants, and lions decorate pillars and basement moldings.

== Conservation ==
Submerged beneath silt from the Saraswati River for over six centuries, Rani ki Vav underwent its earliest documented repairs in 1937–1938, consisting of debris clearing and soil stabilization on depleted slopes. Systematic excavation and structural conservation were initiated by the Archaeological Survey of India (ASI) in the 1960s, exposing the subterranean galleries and recovering buried sculptures.

Between the late 1960s and 1990s, workers cleared accumulated silt from the well shaft, straightened dilapidated side walls, and reset bulged ashlar masonry. Key artifacts recovered during the 1987–1988 desilting included a bronze Tirthankara, a fragmentary Sanskrit inscription, and a marble sculpture depicting Queen Udayamati. Later physical interventions included replacing worn flooring with matching Dhrangadhra stone, repairing earthquake induced cracks, and installing perimeter pathways and safety fencing.

== Depiction ==
Since July 2018, the ₹100 banknote of Mahatma Gandhi New Series, features Rani ki Vav on the reverse.

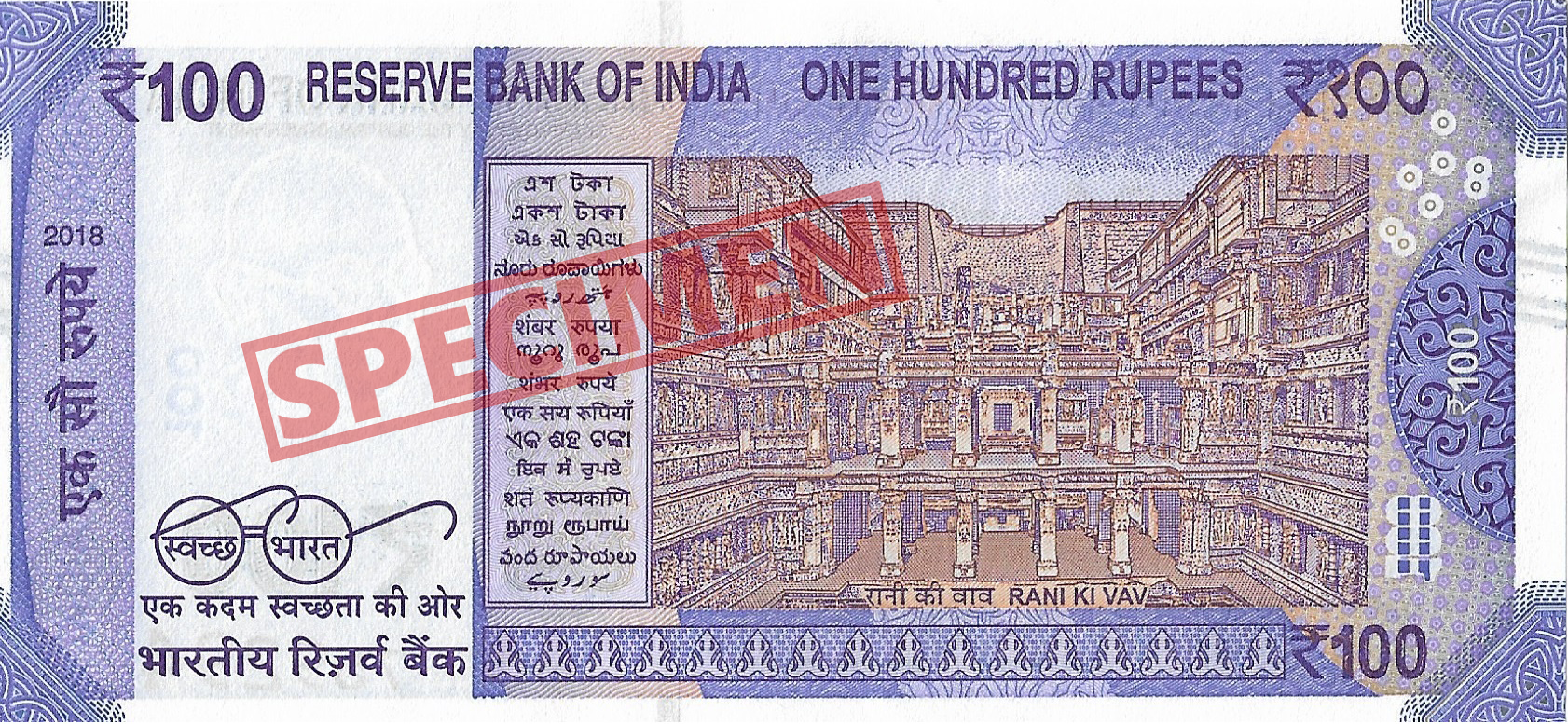
The reverse of the ₹100 banknote featuring Rani ki Vav

== See also ==
- Adalaj Stepwell
- Agrasen Ki Baoli
