= Government Engineering College, Patan =

Government Engineering College, Patan (GEC Patan)
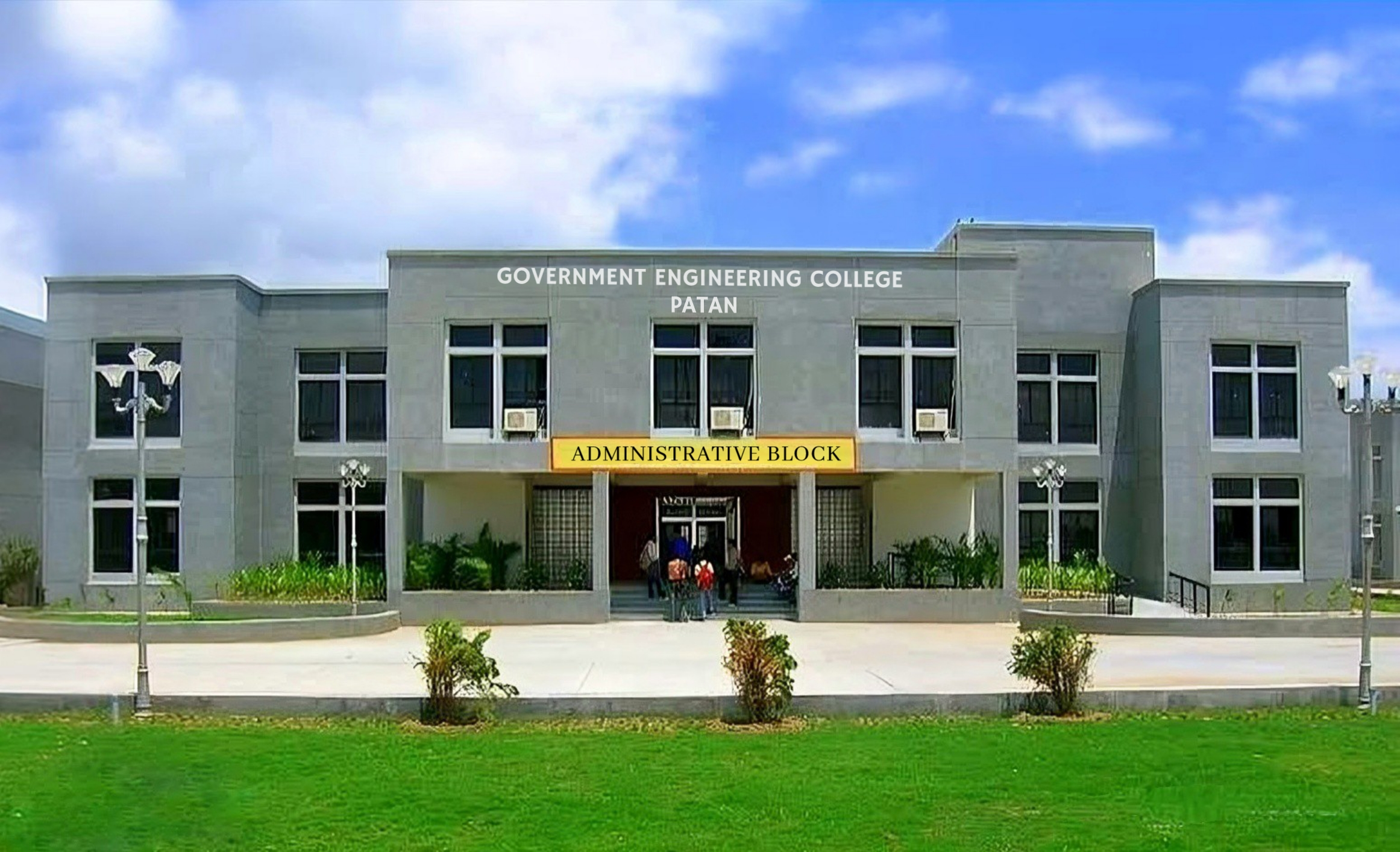
- GEC Patan
- Other names: GECP
- Type: Government
- Established: 2004
- Founders: Anandiben Patel
- Parent institution: Gujarat Technological University
- Affiliations: Gujarat University (2004–2007); Gujarat Technological University (2007–present)
- Principal: Dr. Harshvadan Patel
- Location: Patan, Gujarat, India; 23.8095°N 72.1035°E
- Language: English
- Website: gecpatan.ac.in
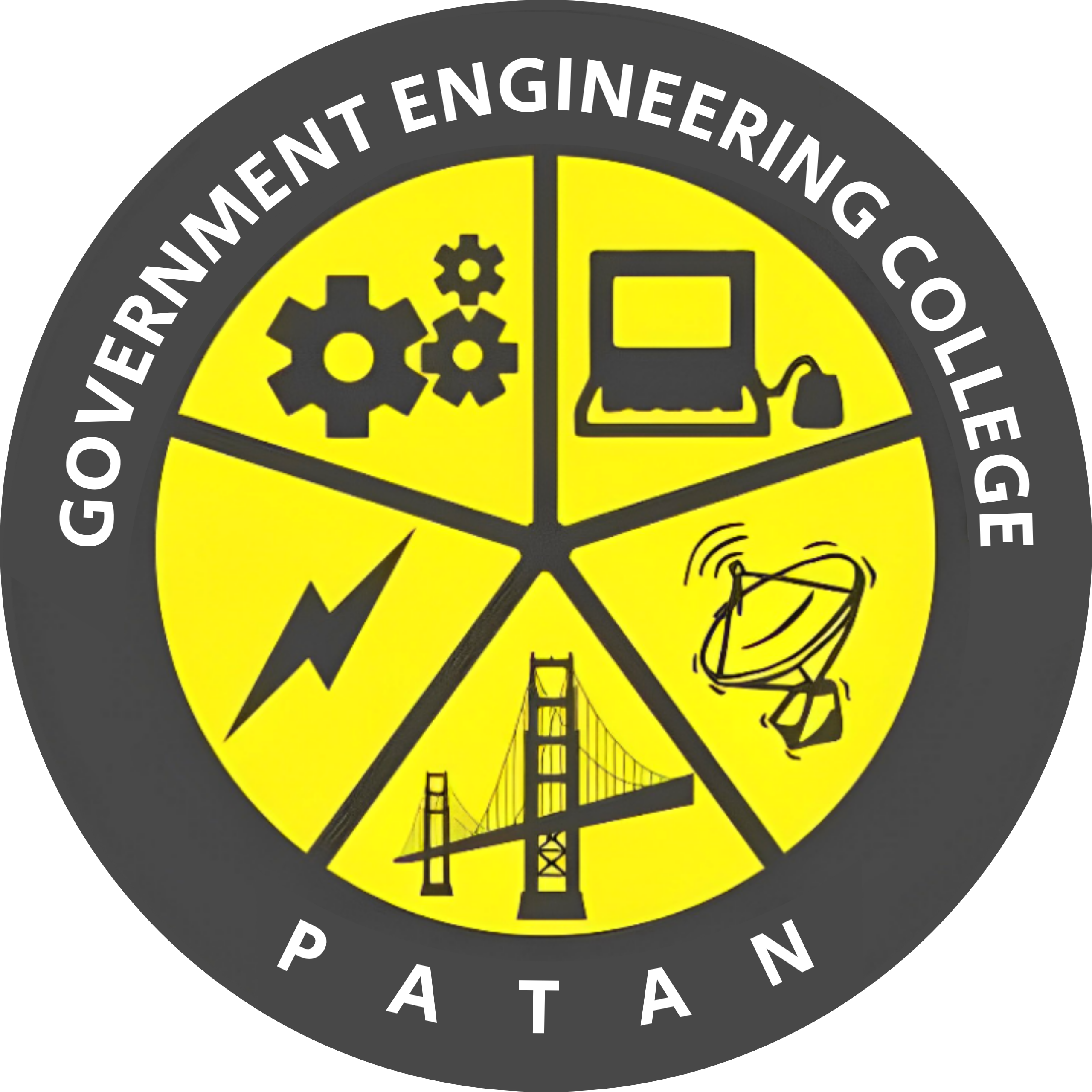

Government Engineering College, Patan (GEC Patan) is an AICTE approved post-secondary engineering college located in Katpur village near Patan, Gujarat, India. It was founded in April 2004, and was moved to Katpur in August 2008.

== History ==
Government Engineering College, Patan was established in April 2004 with three branches Computer Engineering, Electronics and Communication Engineering and Mechanical Engineering each with intake of 60 totaling to 180. The institute was initially functioning in the premises of the K. D. Polytechnic, Patan temporarily. It was shifted to its own newly built up green premise in August 2008 at Katpur village on Chanasma-Patan road 8 km (5.0 mi) before Patan. Two more branches of Electrical Engineering and Civil Engineering each with intake of 60 were introduced from June-2009 and the intake of all three existing branches were increased to 120. Currently, institute functions with total intake of 480 in five different branches.

== Programs ==
The institute runs 5 undergraduate programs.

Degree programs (full-time):

- Civil Engineering
- Computer Science Engineering
- Electrical Engineering
- Electronics and Communication Engineering
- Mechanical Engineering

== Computer Science & Engineering ==
Computer Science & Engineering Department was established in year 2004 intake of 60 and from 2009 intake is increased to 120. It runs under graduate course in Computer Science & Engineering. Computer Engineering Laboratories are outfitted with high performance servers and computers with latest configurations. It includes C programming lab, Computer network lab, Database lab, and Advanced computing lab and Microprocessor lab. Entire campus is connected with high speed fiber network having large capacity Data Server and 100 Mbps Internet facility of 24×7 hrs. Faculty members are dedicated to import quality education in the field of Computer Engineering and active in research & development work to cope with current market trends. Students are imparted knowledge about technology through workshop and expert lectures in order to interact with academia, industries & professionals.

== Civil Engineering ==
The Department of Civil Engineering has been in existence since 2009 with intake of 60 seats. Civil Engineering is considered to be the oldest engineering field. It includes the planning, design, construction, maintenance and operation of the infrastructure that surrounds us. Our infrastructure includes roads, airports, railroads, buildings, bridges, water and wastewater treatment plans, sewers, drainage, flood control, water supply and many other facilities. Most everything civil engineers do affect our daily lives in many ways. Our faculty members are assigned with various theory subjects prepare course plans using the standard format provided by the institute with emphasis on 'learning' of the students. The instructional or lecture delivery of the faculty will be through a set of Educational Technology / Tools opted by the faculty.

=== Applied Mechanics ===
The Applied Mechanics Department is committed to finding solutions to our major sustainability challenges this century and to educating and training the leaders who will have a large impact on our profession and on society. Join us in this important endeavor. The department of Applied Mechanics an independent functioning unit is the backbone of Civil Engineering. The department presents a picture of a small but fully dedicated and developed faculty contributing to all round growth of students, Institute, Industries and Society. While we're equipping our students with the knowledge and tools that can apply to the Civil Engineering and all other Engineering professional skills today, our real goal is to the coming decades.

== Electrical Engineering ==
The Department of Electrical Engineering was established in the year 2009. It has academic programme with intake of 60 under graduate students. The department is equipped with the latest experimental and computational facilities. It runs to cater to the ever-challenging needs of technical excellence in all areas of electrical engineering such as Power Systems, Electrical Machines, Control & Automation, Integrated Electronics & circuits and Power Electronics. The Department is dynamic and has a scholarly environment wherein students learn independently and in collaboration with others to develop a disciplined yet innovative approach to their careers as professional engineers, researchers or teachers and offers a four-year program in Electrical Engineering. It is geared up with outcome-based education imparted to the students. Students at the department are consistently provided with opportunities to upgrade their technical knowledge and develop skills that make them best employable, qualified for higher education or develop them as a strong entrepreneur.

== Mechanical Engineering ==
Our strong academic performance in high school enables you to pursue a range of educational opportunities. One avenue you'll want to explore is mechanical engineering. Studying mechanical engineering at Government Engineering College Patan will equip you with a broad education, preparing you for a variety of career paths graduation and providing a solid foundation for continuing education. Mechanical engineering encompasses many areas. In short, anything that involves the design and or manufacturing of mechanical, thermal or electronic devices and or processes falls entrepreneurs, chief engineers, astronauts, faculty, physicians and patent attorneys, among other occupations. The field includes activities such as designing, developing, manufacturing, managing, researching and controlling engineering systems and their components.

== Electronics And Communication ==
The Electronics and Communication Department at GEC, Patan provides a technology-rich academic environment that enables students to achieve the highest levels of excellence as professionals in the field. The department offers a four-year undergraduate program in Electronics and Communication Engineering. With excellent infrastructure, experienced faculty, and advanced facilities for research, the department ensures that students can hone their skills and stand out among their peers. Established in 2004, the Electronics and Communication Department has been a cornerstone of the institute. It is one of the most sought-after branches, offering the highest number of seats in the state and generating numerous job opportunities. The curriculum covers a wide range of subjects, including AC and Analog Electronics, Digital Electronics, Electrical Machines, Analog and Digital Communication, Fiber Optic Communication, Microwave and Antenna Engineering, Computer Hardware and Networking, Microprocessors and Microcontrollers, Advanced and Wireless Communication, and VLSI. The program also includes elective subjects to provide students with flexibility and depth in specialized areas.

== Science & Humanities ==
The department aims at and focuses on- the overall development of the learner by teaching the subjects of Mathematics, Communication Skills, Contributor personality development and Physics. The faculty members of the department are committed to impart the knowledge based on their vast experience in the field and bringing the best out of learners. With the development of the Language Lab and the Physics Lab in the recent past, learners can now practice and apply their acquired skills. The department is involved in a number of activities like conducting seminars, workshops and guest lectures by eminent personalities of other universities and R&D organizations.

== TEQIP ==
GEC Patan comes under the second phase of TEQIP(A world bank project).

== Facilities ==
The institute provides hostels for men and women, laboratories, a workshop, canteen and a gymkhana building, National Service Scheme Unit(NSS UNIT) & Sports CLub like Fit india Youth CLub (FIYC GEC PATAN).
