= Patan, Gujarat =

City in Gujarat, India

Patan Anhilvad, Anhilpur
- City
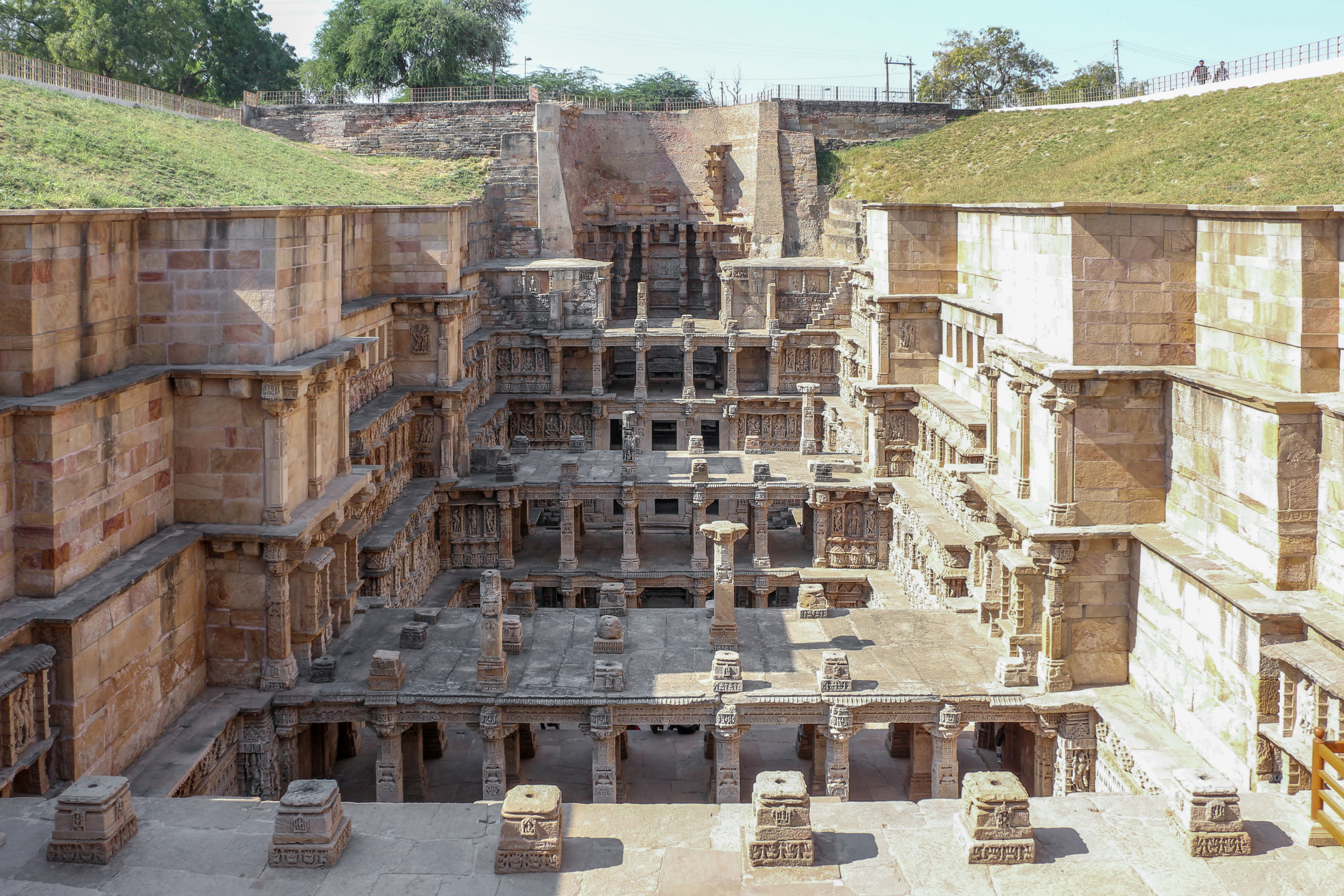
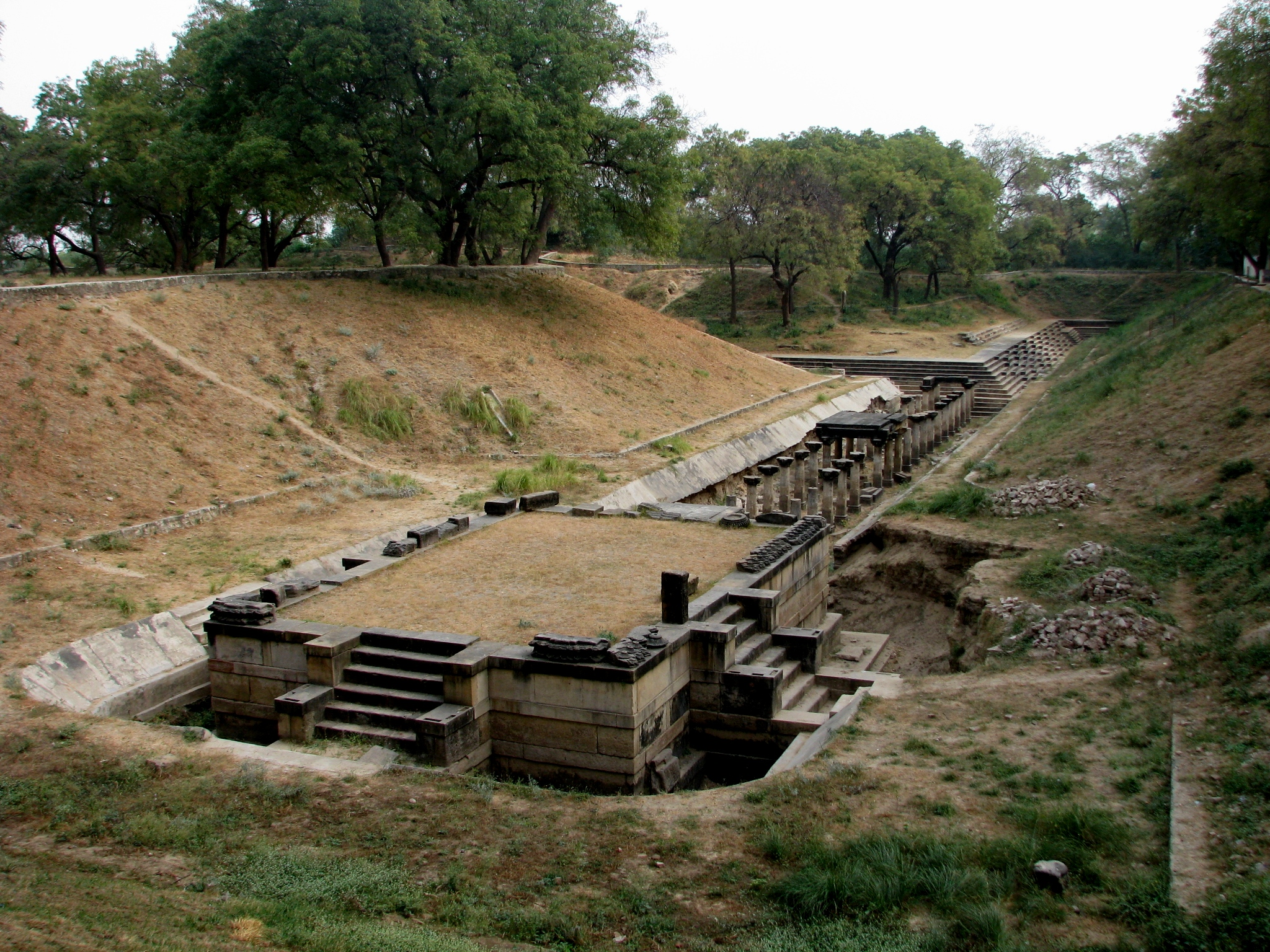
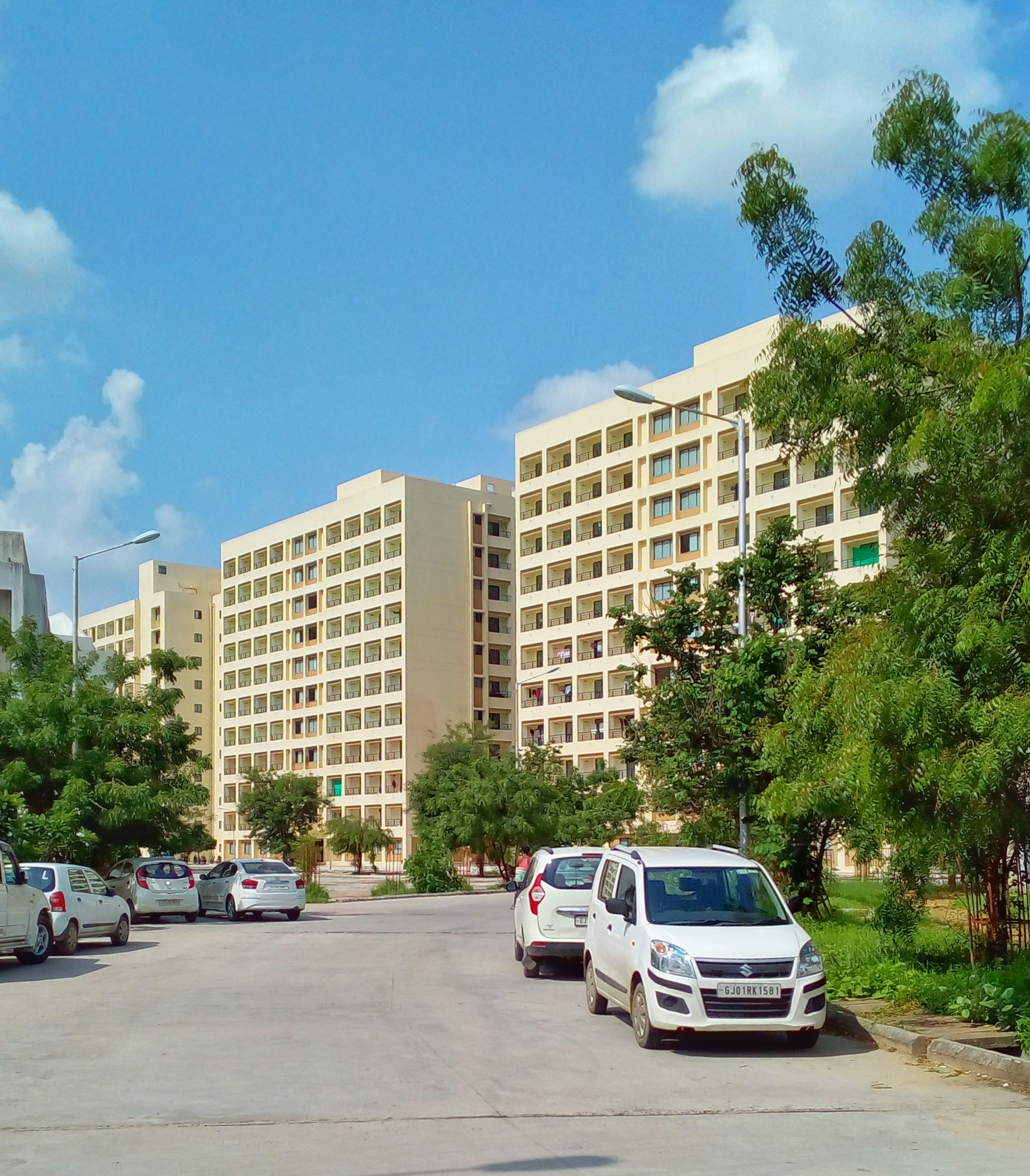
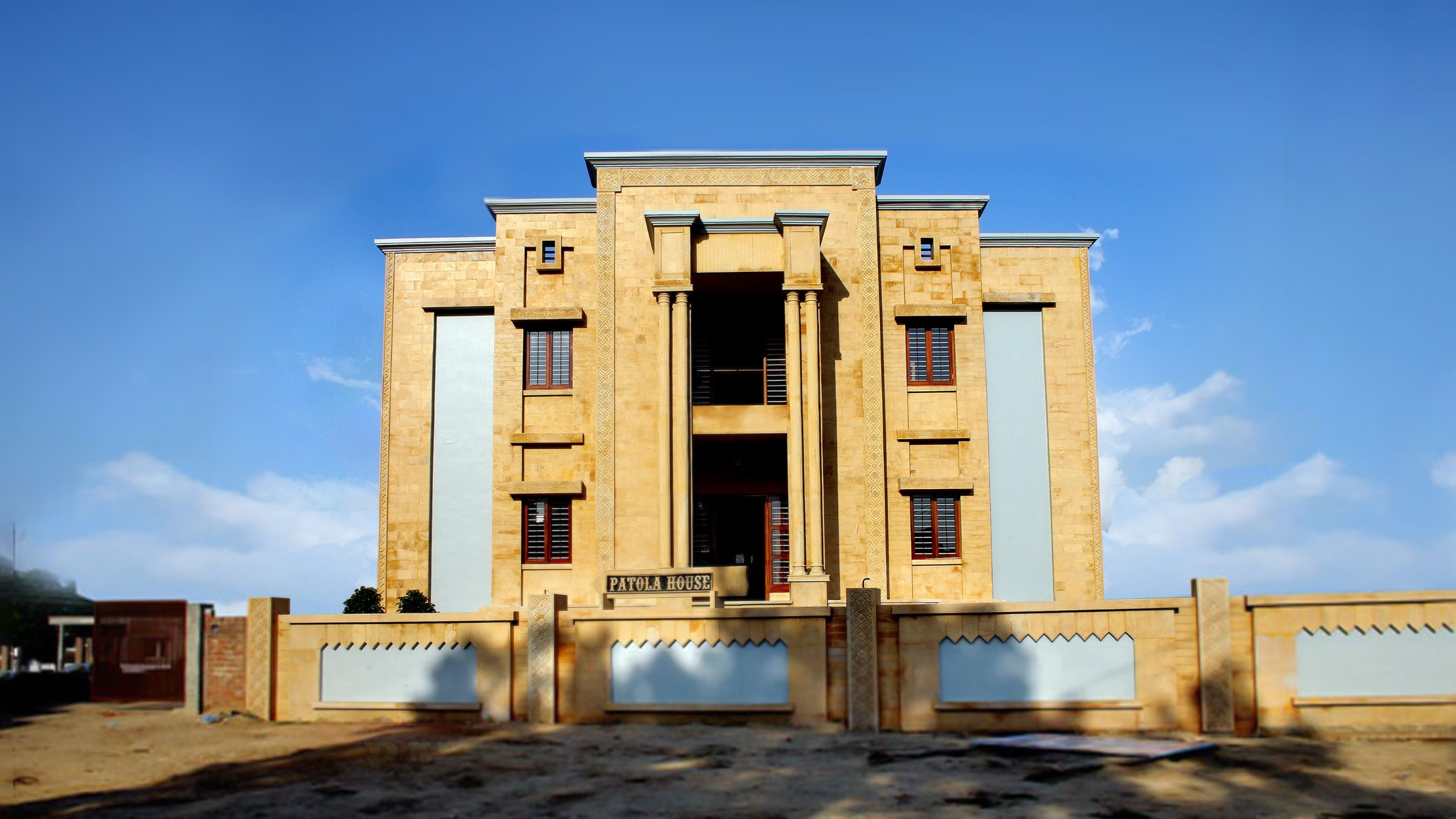
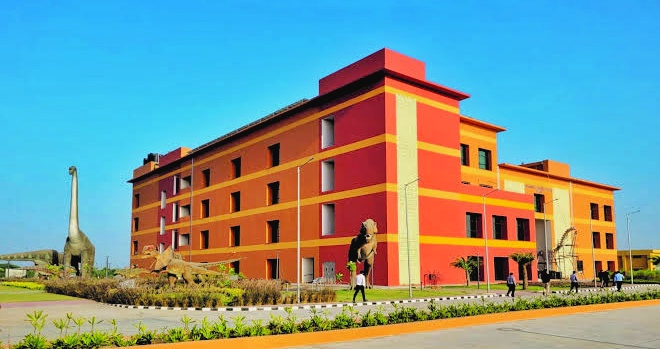
- Clockwise from top-left: Rani ki Vav, GMERS Patan, Science Centre, Patola House, Sahasraling Lake

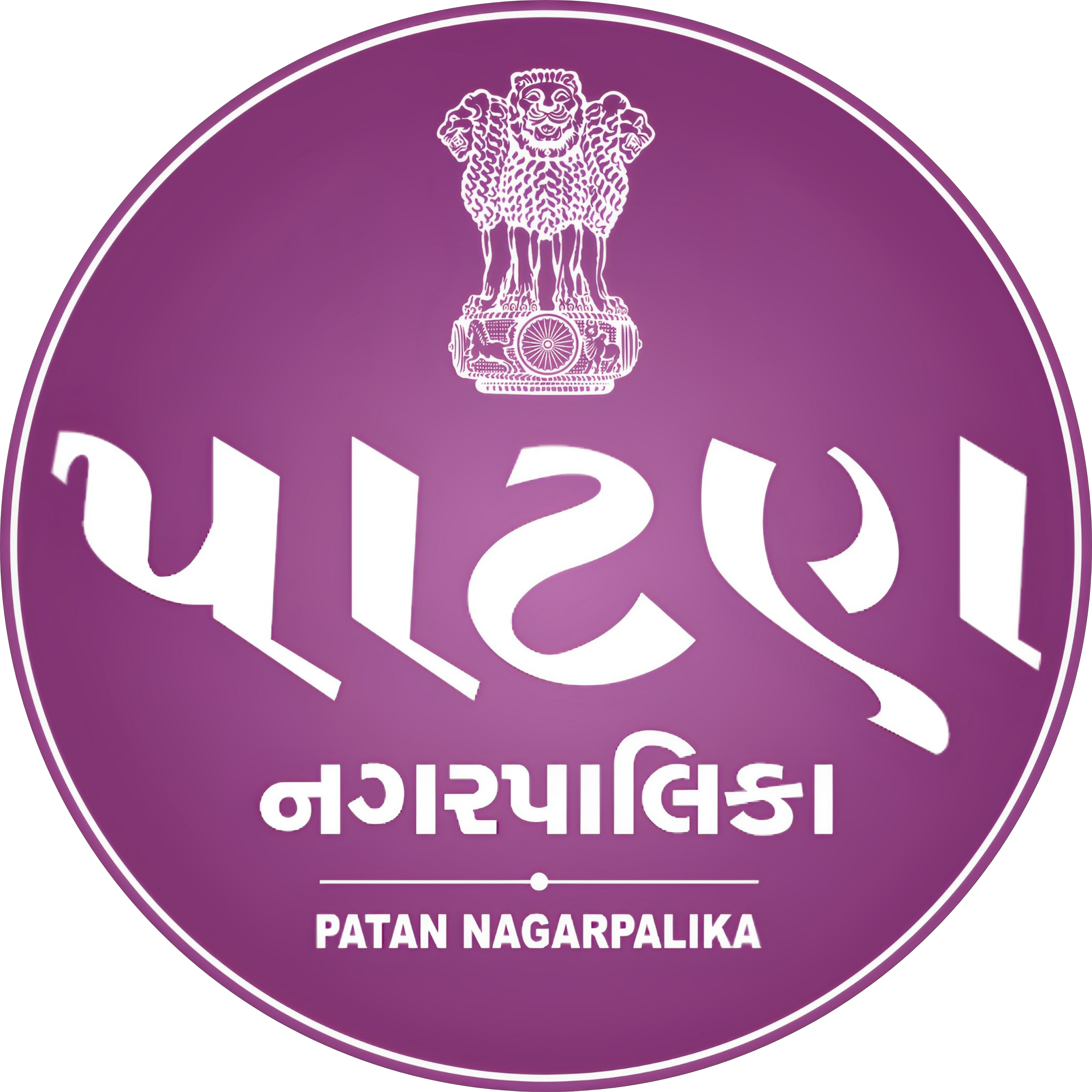
- Logo of the Patan Municipality
- Nickname: Patola City
- Interactive map of Patan
- Location in Gujarat, India Patan (India)
- Coordinates: 23°51′00″N 72°07′30″E
- Country: India
- State: Gujarat
- Region: North Gujarat
- District: Patan
- Ward: 14
- Establishment: 8th Century as Anhilpur Patan
- Founder: Vanraj Chavda

Government
  - Type: Patan Municipality
  - MLA: Dr. Kirit Patel
  - Lok Sabha constituency: Patan Lok Sabha constituency

Area
  - City: 43.89 km^{2} (16.95 sq mi)
- Elevation: 76 m (249 ft)

Population (2023)
  - City: 265,000
  - Rank: 16th (Gujarat)
  - Density: 6,040/km^{2} (15,600/sq mi)
  - Metro: 284,000

Languages
  - Official: Gujarati, Hindi, and English
- Time zone: UTC+5:30 (IST)
- PIN: 384265,384275, 384290
- Telephone code: 02766
- Vehicle registration: GJ-24

UNESCO World Heritage Site
- Official name: Rani ki Vav
- Type: Cultural
- Criteria: Cultural: (i), (iv)
- Designated: 2014 (38th session)
- Reference no.: 922
- Region: Southern Asia

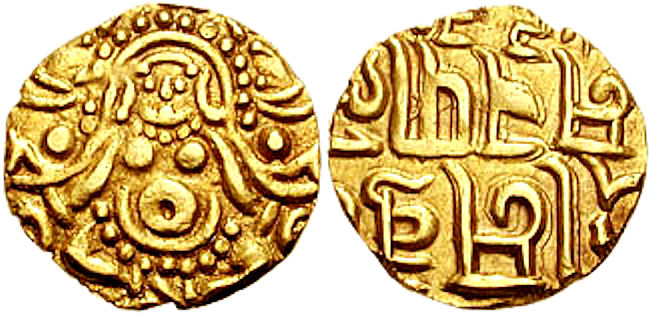
Gold coin of the Chaulukyas of Anahillapataka (Patan), King Kumarapala, c. 1145 – c. 1171.

Patan is a city and headquarters of Patan district in the Indian state of Gujarat. Patan was the capital of Gujarat's Chavda and Chaulukya dynasties in medieval times. During Gujarat Sultanate, it was the capital from 1407 to 1411.

Patan was established by the Chavda king Vanaraja. During the rule of several Hindu and Muslim dynasties, it thrived as a trading city and a regional capital of northern Gujarat. The city contains many Hindu and Jain temples as well as mosques, dargahs and rauzas.

It is a historical place located on the bank of the now-extinct Saraswati River. Patan has an old market, which is quite sizeable and is believed to have been in continuous operation since at least the rule of Vaghelas and gandhis.

== History ==
Patan was established by the Chavda ruler Vanaraja in the ninth century as "Anahilapataka". During the 10th–13th centuries, the city served as the capital of the Chaulukya dynasty, who succeeded the Chavdas.

=== Jain community ===
Vanaraja Chavda (c. 746 CE to c. 780 CE), the most prominent ruler of the Chavda dynasty established the territory of Patan in 746 CE and built the Panchasara Parshwanath temple with main idol of Parshvanatha brought from Panchasar village.

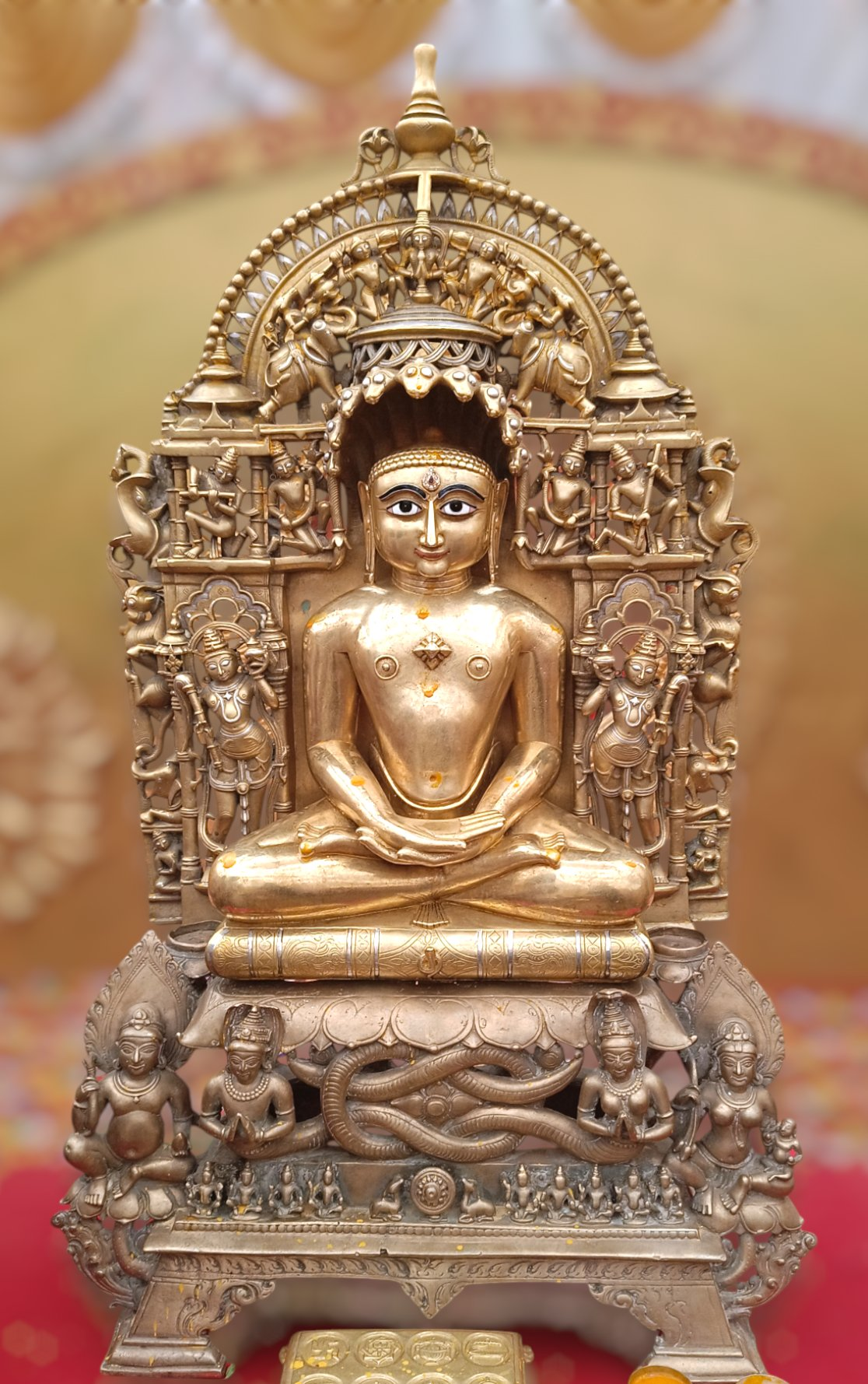
A 10th century CE idol of Parshvanatha from Patan, Gujarat

During the rule of Chaulukya dynasty (or Solanki dynasty), Patan was a major pilgrimage centre of Jainism. There are more than 100 temples in the region. The temple was rebuilt in the 16th–17th centuries after destruction by Muslim invaders. Patan has been home to a community of Jains for at least several hundred years. According to a 1375 CE letter written by a Jain monk:

The people here participate in shining devotion, gifting, morality, and asceticism;
the mendicants are firm in upholding the blossom of equanimity;
the many Jain temples are blessed with a multitude of images;
and even in time of drought the people obtain success in religious actions by means of their merit.
The merchants here have built up a mountain of gold;
there are many playful young women with swift feet and side-glancing doe-like eyes;
gifting is given as if to a divine tree which will sing their praises;
and even those focused on moksha at once touch that true excellence amidst the pleasures of transmigration.

– Verses 13-14 of Vijñapti Mahālekha, sent by the Kharatara Gaccha Jain mendicant Jinodayasūri from Patan to Lokahitācārya in Ayodhya, in 1375 C.E.

== The modern city ==
=== Education ===
There is a Government Engineering College in Patan which is near Katpur Village. This college under the Gujarat Technological University.

Patan is home to the Hemchandracharya North Gujarat University named after the polymath Acharya Hemachandra. It was previously known as North Gujarat University.

There are many schools and colleges in Patan. Kendriya Vidyalaya Patan, Sheth B.D. High School, P.P.G experimental higher secondary school and Junior College is the oldest. Other schools are P.P.G. Experimental High School, Adarsha Vidhyalaya, Bhagwati International Public School, Sheth M.N. High School, Sheth B.M. High School, Prerna Mandir High School, Pioneer School of Science, Lord Krishna School of Science and Eklavya School of Science.

There are K.D. Polytechnic Patan for diploma in engineering, Government Engineering College and Sheth M.N. Science College, Sheth M.N.Law College. Patan is the education hub in North Gujarat. Also near by Patan 15km away is Jagruti U.B.Vidhyalay, Vareda, a leading high school in rural area of Patan.

Patan is also known for the fotonVR startup which won the egovernence silvar award for Innovative Use of ICT.

=== Healthcare ===
Patan is a prominent medical centre in North Gujarat with almost 200 practicing medical professionals. It has a medical college named GMERS Medical College and Hospital, Dharpur-Patan at Dharpur on Unjha Highway.

Major hospitals include General Hospital, Janta Hospital, Naari Hospital, Docter House and other clinics in Patan.

== Patola ==
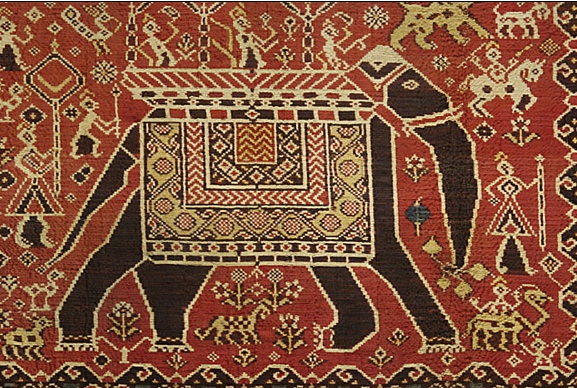
Patola

Patola is one of the finest hand-woven sarees produced today. This is a specialty of Patan. It is known for extremely delicate patterns woven with great precision and clarity. A patola sari takes 4 to 6 months to make, depending on how complicated the designs is and if the length is 5 or 6 metres. The saris are colored with vegetable colors. Costs start from Rs. 20,000 which may go up to Rs. 20,00,000 depending on the difficulty of work and the amount of gold threads included during the weaving process.

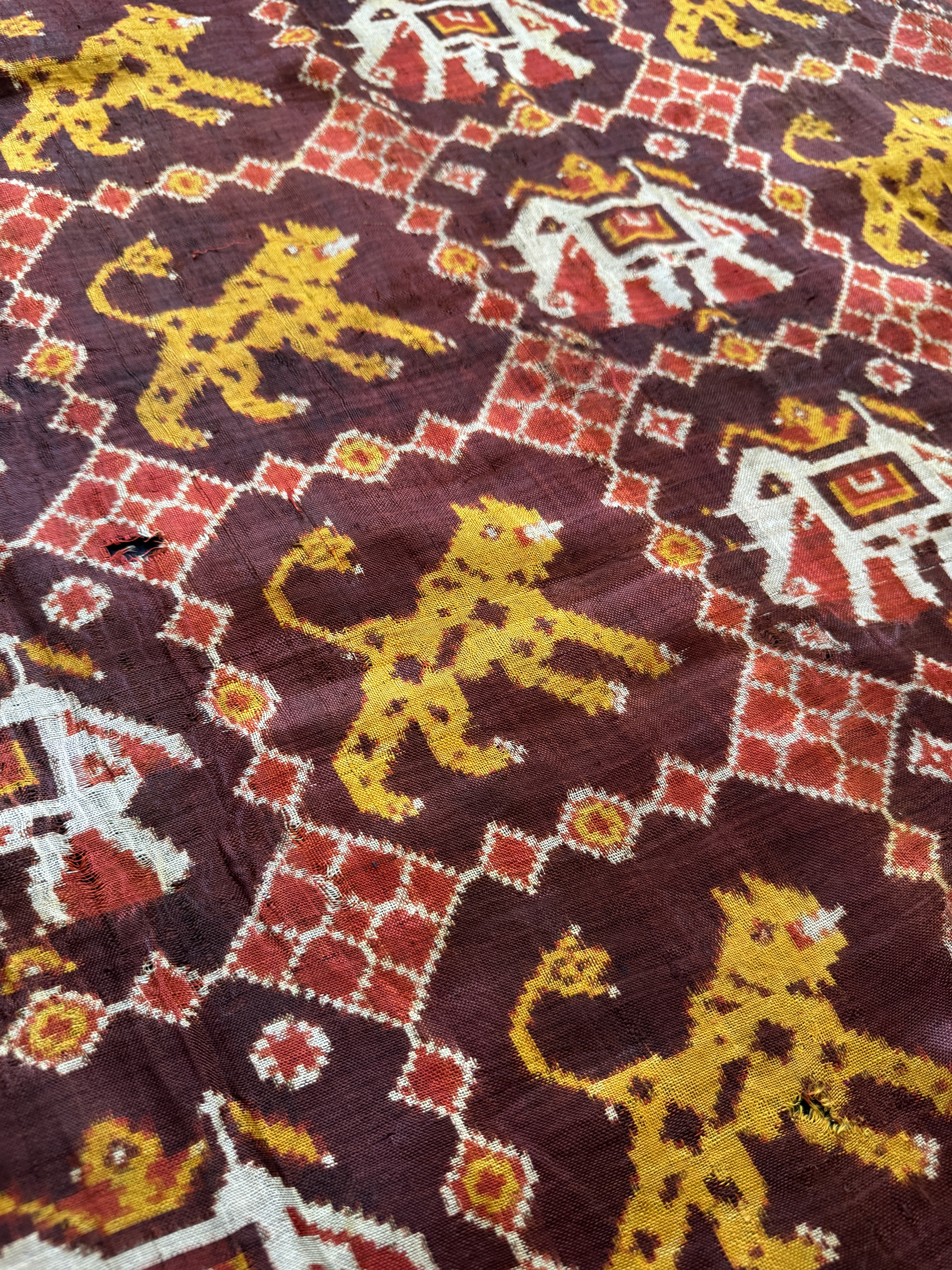
Woven in Patan, Gujarat, India for the Indonesian market. this is known as a ‘patolu’ (pl. ‘patola’. Courtesy Wovensouls collection, Singapore).

There are only two families making patola saris. They do not teach this art to other family members. Only their sons are eligible to learn.

Salvivad is a place where patolas are woven along with places where traditional clay toys are made. Many annual religious fairs act as tourist destinations.

It is an ancient art and needs to be preserved as well as nurtured. Local people in Gujarat praise the "Patan Na patola" as being the most costly item for women to afford in Gujarat.

== Tourist attractions ==
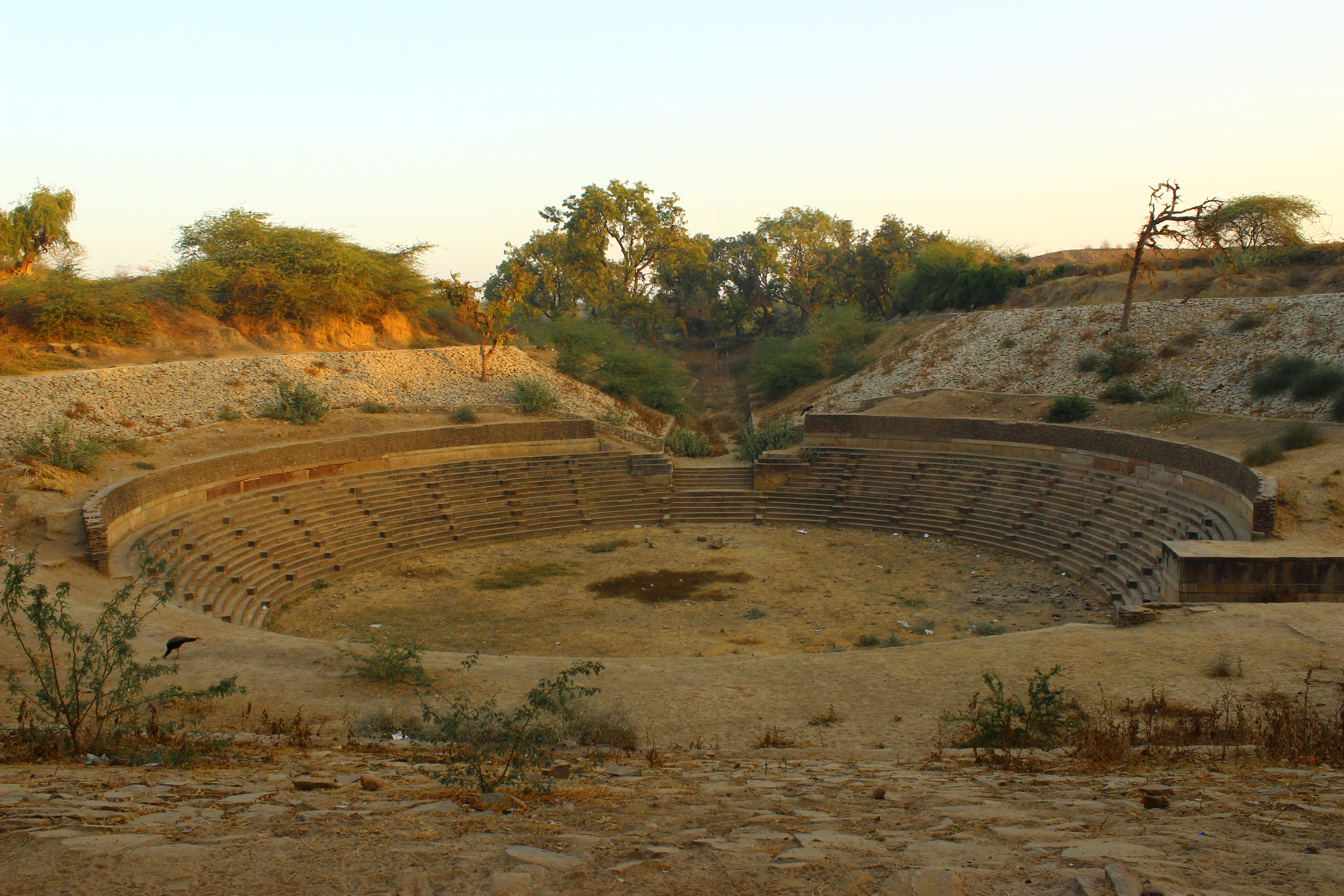
Sahasralinga Talav

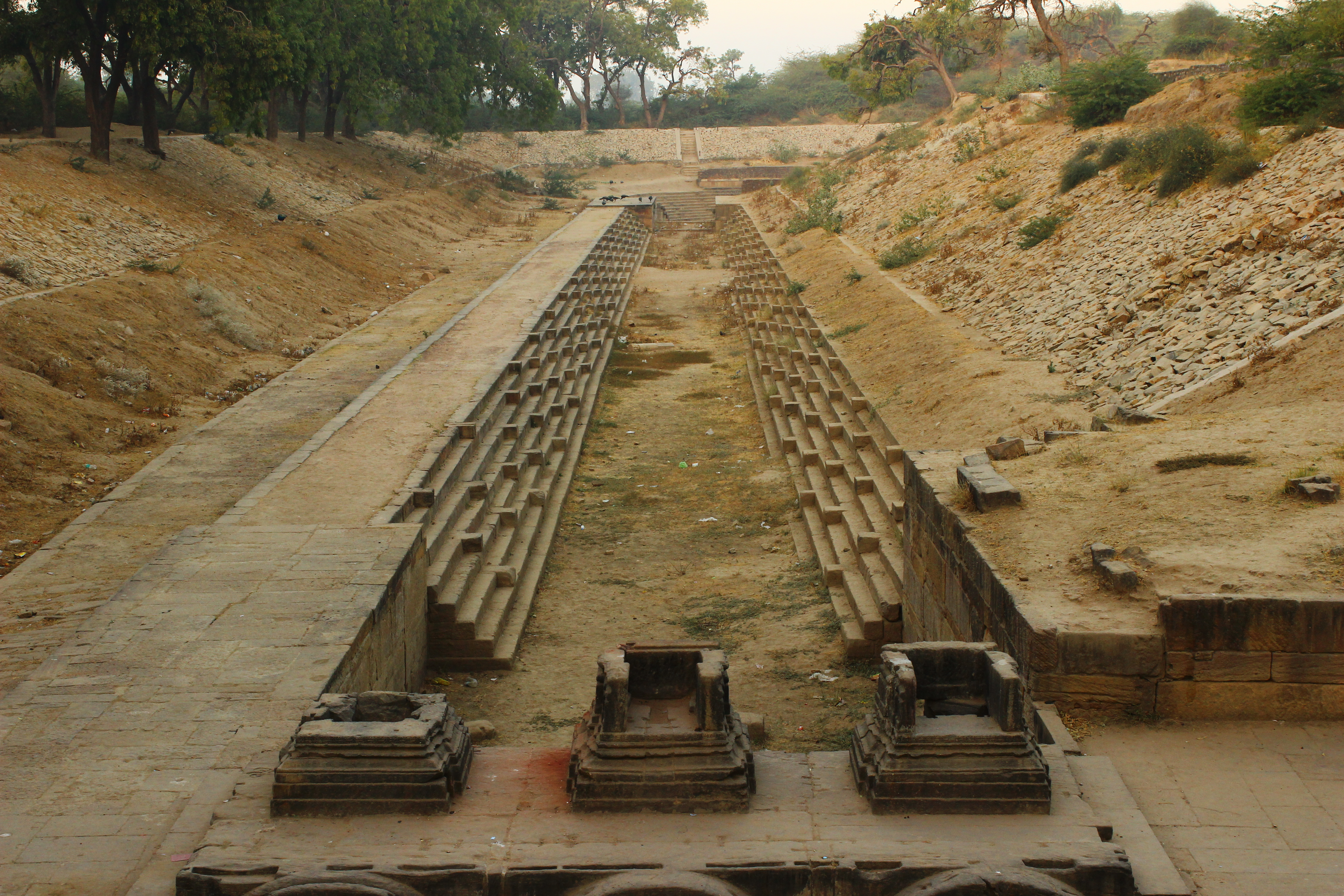
Canal of Water tank (Lake)

Two architectural monuments have gained the status of national monuments. One of them is Sahastralinga tank and other one is Rani ki Vav stepwell.

=== Panchasara Parshvanath Temple ===
The Panchasara Parshvanath Temple is an important Jain temple located in Patan.

=== Rani ki Vav ===
Rani ki Vav is an intricately constructed stepwell situated in the town of Patan in Gujarat, India. It is located on the banks of the now dried-up Saraswati River, which was a seasonal river even during its best period.

This stepwell is the oldest and the deepest among the 120 other stepwell in Gujarat. The sculpture of Rani ki Vav depicting Vishnu's avatars, Hindu goddesses, Jain idols and their ancestors. Most of the sculpture is in devotion to Vishnu, in the forms of his avatars (Krishna, Rama and others), representing their return to the world. It was included in the list of UNESCO World Heritage Sites on 22 June 2014.

=== Sahasralinga Tank ===
Sahasralinga Tank is an artificial water tank that was constructed during the Chaulukya (Solanki) rule. It is designated as a Monument of National Importance and is protected by the Archaeological Survey of India.

=== Regional Science Centre ===
The Regional Science Centre, sometimes Regional Science Museum Patan, provides interactive exhibits, activities and shows to promote science learning. There is a Dinosaur Park, exhibits about the human body, optics, and how science is used in everyday life through hydroponics, solar energy, and rainwater harvesting. There are also science demonstrations, hands-on experiments, and virtual reality experiences.

PATAN PATOLA HERIAGTE MUSEUM

The museum is a masterpiece reflecting at the timeless craftmanship of the Patola textile weaving legacy. The museum is manged by the Salvi family, who have preserved the ancestral art of Patola weaving for over thirty five generations. Shri Vinayak Kantilal Salvi, veteran Patola Weaver of the Salvi family, was awarded the Ship Guru Award by the Hon'ble President on India, in 2002, for his lifelong dedication to the heritage craft.

== Transport ==
=== Bus ===
The city bus service is run by the municipality, connecting nearby villages. Autorickshaws are available. Patan Bus Port is under construction.

=== Rail ===
Patan is 108 km from Ahmedabad Railway Station. Ahmedabad – Bhagat Ki Kothi (Jodhpur) is the main line. It is also connected by rail to Mehsana, Ahmedabad and Okha by BG Line. Patan railway station is now connected with Bhildi Railway Station via the new BG Line.

=== Roads ===
The National Highway 68 connecting Ramgarh in Rajasthan with the province of Gujarat passes through Patan-Chanasma, thus connecting it with the cities Jaisalmer, Barmer and Radhanpur. State Highways SH 7, 10, 130 pass through Patan and connect it with the nearest cities of Gujarat. National Highway 68 connects it with Mehsana, Himmatnagar and Ahmedabad.

=== Air ===
The closest Airport is Mehsana Airport which is 51 km from Patan. Deesa Airport is 53 km from Patan.

== Education ==
- Hemchandracharya North Gujarat University
- Government Engineering College, Patan
- GMERS Medical College and Hospital, Dharpur-Patan
- M.K. University
- North Gujarat Education Society Mumbai (HNGU)

== Festival ==
Like the whole of Gujarat, Garba festival is celebrated with great enthusiasm in Patan, Gujarat|Patan too but the main festival of Patan is Rathyatra. After Puri and Ahmedabad, the third biggest and oldest Rathyatra in the whole world is celebrated in Patan.

== Demographics ==
Religions in Patan city
Religion	Percent
Hindus	87.11%
Muslims	11.35%
Jains	1.27%
Others	0.28%

As of 2001 India census, Patan had a population of 112,038. Males constitute 53% of the population and females 47%. Patan has an average literacy rate of 72%, higher than the national average of 59.5%: male literacy is 78%, and female literacy is 65%. In Patan, 11% of the population is under 6 years of age.

Patan		Male	Female
Population	112,308	53%	47%
Literacy rate	72%	78%	65%
Under-6	11%		

Patan is home to a large Śvetāmbara Murtipujaka Jain community that has deep roots in Patan. The community has been documented in an ethnography by John E. Cort (2001).

== Notable people ==
- Kinjal Dave – Gujarati singer
- Maniraj Barot – Gujarati singer
- Anandiben Patel – former chief minister of Gujarat
- Karsanbhai Patel – businessman
- Naresh Kanodia – Gujarati film actor and singer
- Hitu Kanodia – Gujarati film actor and politician
- Mahesh Kanodia – Gujarati film singer and politician

== See also ==
- Kumarapala (Chaulukya dynasty)
- Hemachandra
- Siddhpur
