= Kinjal Dave =

Gujarati singer

- Born: 24 November 1998 (age 27); Patan, Gujarat, India
- Genres: Folk, contemporary, devotional, motivational
- Occupations: Singer, actor
- Years active: 2015–present
- Label: K D Digital

Kinjal Dave (born 24 November 1998) is an Indian singer known for her work in the Gujarati music industry. Kinjal began singing at a young age and gained fame with her hit song "Char Bangdi Vali Gadi" in 2017. Since then, she has released many popular songs and has performed at various events in India and abroad. Kinjal is known for her traditional Gujarati folk music and has won several awards for her contribution to the music industry.

== Biography ==
Dave was born on 24 November 1998 in Jesangpura, a village near Patan, Gujarat.

She debuted in music industry with her Gujarati song "Jonadiyo". Dave rose to prominence with her chartbuster song "Chaar Chaar Bangadiwali Gadi" released in 2016. She, her publisher RDC Media and studio Saraswati Studio were sued by Red Ribbon Entertainment and Kartik Patel (also known as Kathiyawadi King), a Gujarati singer from Australia, for copyright infringement. Patel claimed that the song is a copy of his original song with minor changes. His song was uploaded on YouTube three months before the release of Dave's song. Dave claimed that it is an original song written by Manubhai Rabari in 2014. In January 2019, the Ahmedabad Commercial Court restrained Dave from using the song until the case is resolved. The Gujarat High Court removed this restrain a month later. In April 2019, the Ahmedabad Commercial Court dismissed the case citing jurisdiction issue. The fresh copyright infringement notice was issued by the Ahmedabad Civil Court in September 2019. Dave's publisher RDC Media and Saraswati Studio accepted the copyright infringement and agreed to remove the song from their platforms, leaving Dave defending the case alone.

Her other Gujarati songs include "Chaar Chaar Bangdi Vali Gadi", "Ame Gujarati Leri Lala", "Chote Raja", "Ghate Toh Ghate Zindagi", "Jay Adhyashakti Aarti" and "Dhan Chhe Gujarat" and "Makhan Chor".

She made her acting debut with the 2018 Gujarati film Dada Ho Dikri. In 2019, she became a member of the Bharatiya Janata Party.

== Awards ==
In 2019, she received the Gauravshali Gujarati Award at the 12th Gauravvanta Gujarati Awards. In 2020, she received the Feelings Pride of India Award in music category.

== Discography ==
=== Singles ===
- Jonadiyo (2016)
- Kanaiya (2017)
- Ganesha (2017)
- Chhote Raja (2017)
- Leri Lala (2017)
- Mauj Ma (2018)
- Kinjal Connection (2018)
- Navrat (2019)
- Jay Adhyashakti Aarti (2019)
- Dhan Chhe Gujarat (2019)
- Shambhu Dhun Lagi (2019)
- Paisa Chhe To Prem Chhe (2019)
- Rut Bawari (2019)
- Makhan Chor (2019)
- Bhailu Halya Jaan Ma (2020)
- Killol (2020)
- Shiv Bhola (2020)
- Mono To Mata Se (2020)
- Vraj Ma Velo Aay (2020)
- Bhai No Mel Padi Gayo (2020)
- Vagyo Re Dhol (2020)
- Mahakal (2020)
- Ranaji (2020)
- Khamma Khodal (2021)
- Parne Maro Viro (2021)
- Ae Maa (2021)
- Kinjal Connection - 2 (2021)
- Jivi Le (2021)
