= Hemchandracharya North Gujarat University =

Public university in Gujarat, India

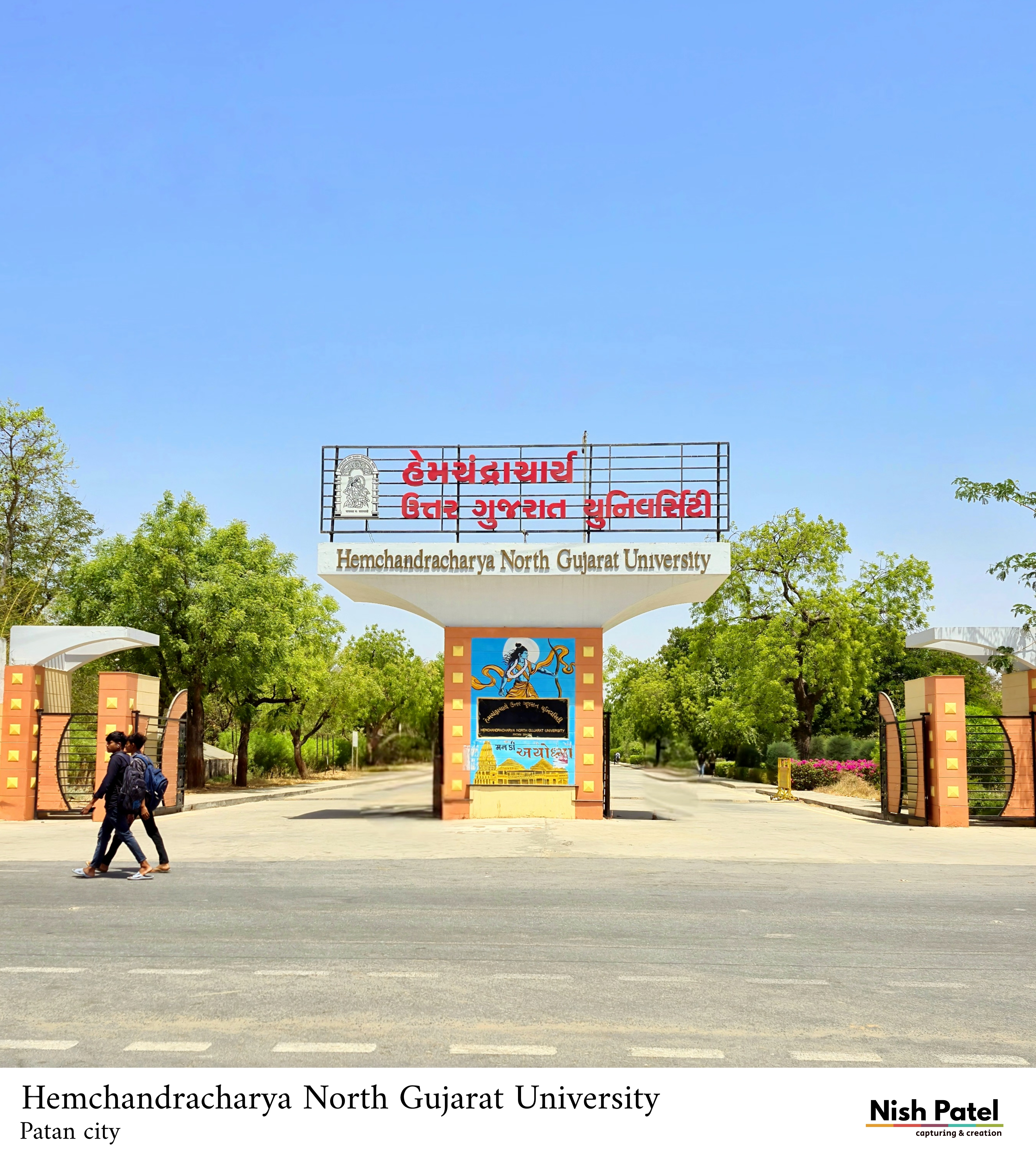
- Motto: Sanskrit: पावका नः सरस्वती
- Type: Public
- Established: 1986; 40 years ago
- Accreditation: UGC, NAAC
- Chancellor: Governor of Gujarat
- Vice-Chancellor: Dr. K. C. Poria
- Location: Patan 384265, Gujarat, India; 23°51′50″N 72°8′12″E
- Campus: Urban
- Website: www.ngu.ac.in

Hemchandracharya North Gujarat University (HNGU) is a public university in Patan, Gujarat, India. The geographical jurisdiction of the North Gujarat University encompasses five districts: Aravalli, Banaskantha, Mehsana, Patan and Sabarkantha. It is NAAC 'B' accredited state university with a CGPA of 3.02.

== History ==
North Gujarat University was established by Ordinance No. 5 of 1986 dated 17 May 1986 which was later passed as the North Gujarat University Act No. 22 of 1986 on 11 September 1986 by Gujarat Legislative Assembly.

== Location and campus growth ==
This university was carved out of Gujarat University. On bifurcation, the North Gujarat University inherited no physical assets from its parent university.

Patan, a historical town in northern part of Gujarat, was officially designated as the headquarters of the university. The town happens to have composite campus of four affiliated colleges. The managing council of the colleges was kind enough to let the infant university rent its two hostel buildings to accommodate its offices. Thus the university began to operate and serve 41 colleges scattered over the three districts of Banaskantha, Mehsana and Sabarkantha.

With the two hostel buildings, the university rented Gandhi Memorial Hall to house its library. The aim was to start building a nucleus library for the future post-graduate departments.

The university simultaneously moved the state government to acquire land measuring about 185 acres (0.75 km^{2}) from farmers. It also requested the state government to transfer its seed farm land measuring about 35 acres (140,000 m^{2}) to the university. This entailed considerable delay owing to litigation in the State High Court and then in the Supreme Court.

Following the Supreme Court judgment, acquisition of the land has been possible. As a result, over the years the university has been able to get land as follows:

- Government land 35.00 acres (141,600 m^{2})
- Land acquired from farmers 177.50 acres (0.7183 km^{2}). The university will, in due course, acquire land measuring 7.50 acres (30,400 m^{2}) from one farmer.

The total land available is 212.50 acres (0.8600 km^{2}).

In addition to this, the university has received a property worth Rs.10 lakhs donated by the Gramodhyog Mandal, Patan. The university employment bureau is housed in that building. Proposals to the state government for further assistance in materializing plans for more constructions, in phased manner, are under active consideration.

=== Vice-Chancellor ===
- Shri K.P. Yajnik Dt. 01-08-1986 to 31-07-1992
- Dr. D.A. Ghanchi Dt. 01-08-1992 to 05-04-1994 (Acting)
- Prin. C.D. Trivedi Dt. 06-04-1994 to 30-04-1994 (Acting)
- Prof. N.R. Dave Dt. 30-04-1994 to 30-04-2000
- Dr. B.S. Jani Dt. 01-05-2000 to 30-04-2003
- Dr. M.M. Patel Dt. 01-05-2003 to 27-01-2005 (Acting)
- Dr. M.M. Patel Dt. 28-01-2005 to 10-07-2006
- Dr. B.A. Prajapati Dt. 10-07-2006 to 26-07-2007 (Acting)
- Dr. K.K. Shah Dt. 26-07-2007 to 26-07-2010
- Dr. J. H. Pancholi Dt. 27-07-2010 to 15-09-2010 (Acting)
- Dr. H.V. Rao Dt. 16-09-2010 to 15-09-2013
- Dr. R. L. Godara Dt. 16-09-2013 to 16-09-2016
- Dr. D.H. Devada Dt. 16-09-2016 to 20-12-2016 (Acting)
- Prof. B. A. Prajapati Dt. 20-12-2016 to 06-03-2019
- Dr. Anil J. Nayak Dt. 07-03-2019 to 07-01-2020(Acting)
- Prof. (Dr.) Jabali J. Vora Dt. 08-01-2020 to 07-01-2023
- Dr. Rohitkumar N. Desai Dt. 07-01-2023 to 14-03-2024 (Acting)
- Prof. Kishorkumar Chhaganlal Poria Dt. 15-03-2024 to

== Departments and centres ==
=== Departments ===
- Department of Chemistry
- Department of Life sciences Incl. Environment Science and Microbiology
- Department of Mathematics
- Department of Computer & Information Technology
- Department of Commerce & Management
- Department of English
- Department of Sanskrit and Bhartiya Vidya
- Department of Education
- Department of Physics
- Department of Library & Information Science
- Department of Social Work
- Department of Journalism & Mass Communication
- Department of Hospital management
- Department of law
- Institute of Architecture
- Department of Biotechnology
- Department of Physical Education
- S. K. College of Business Management

=== Centres ===
- Centre for Indian Diaspora
- Centre for Cede
- Computer Centre
- Study Centre for BAOU
- Jain Academy Educational Research Centre
- Yoga Centre
- Centre of Astrology
