= Saraswati River (Gujarat) =

Saraswati
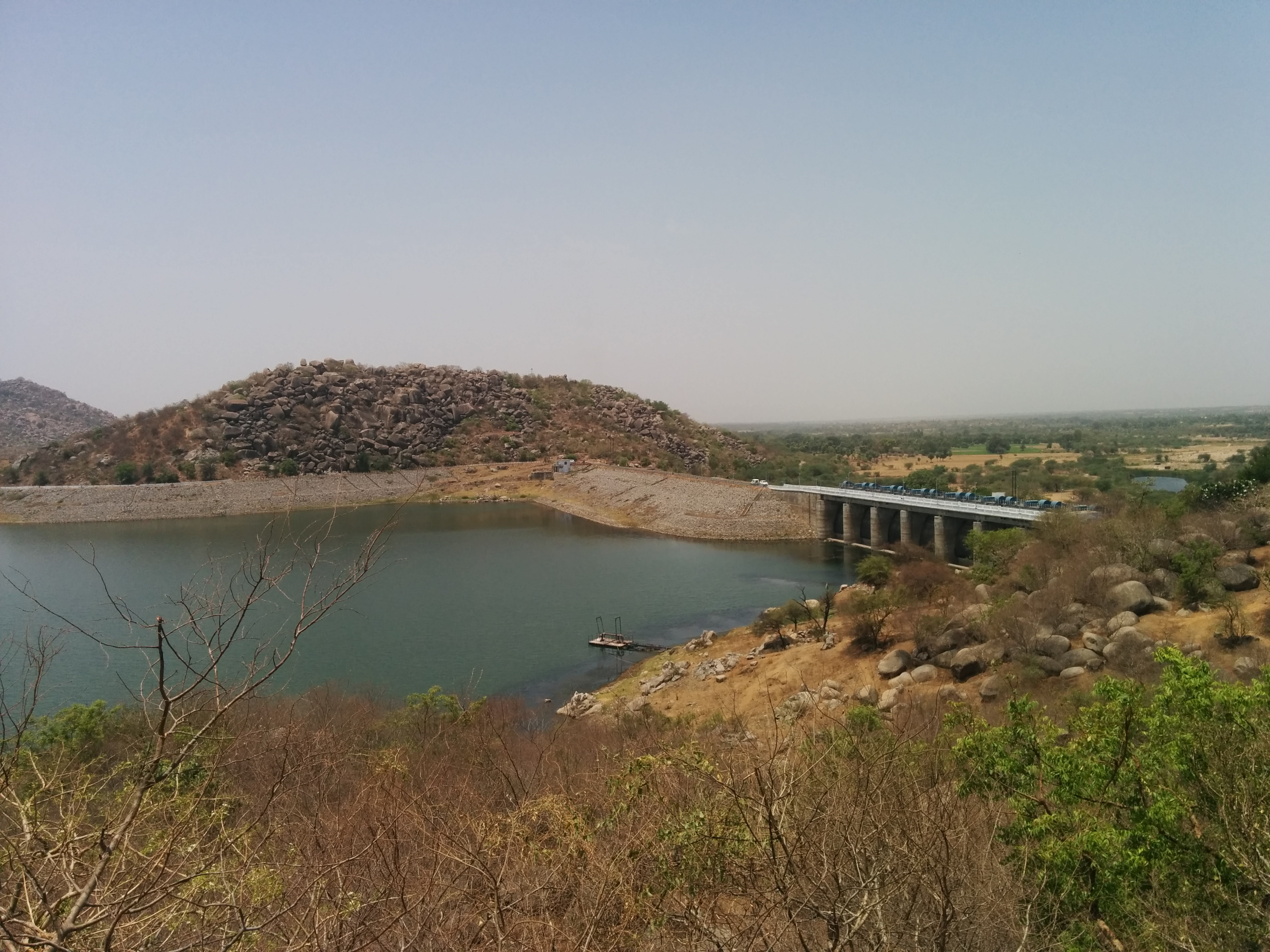
- Mokeshwar dam on Saraswati River

Location
- Country: India
- State: Gujarat
- Districts: Banaskantha, Patan
- Cities: Sidhpur, Patan
- Dams: Mukteshwar Dam Banaskantha, Sarswati Dam Patan

Physical characteristics
- Source: Koteshwar
  - location: India
- Mouth
  - location: Arabian Sea, India
- Length: 360 km (220 mi)
- Discharge
  - location: Arabian Sea

Saraswati River is a river in Western India in the state of Gujarat which originates from the Aravalli Mountain Range. Its basin has a maximum length of 360 km. The total catchment area of the basin is 370 square kilometres (140 sq mi). The Mokeshwar or Mukteshwar dam is on the Saraswati River.

Patan and Siddhpur are located on the banks of Saraswati River.

== See also ==
- Patan
- Sidhpur
