= Kirti Toran =

Gateway in Vadnagar, Gujarat, India

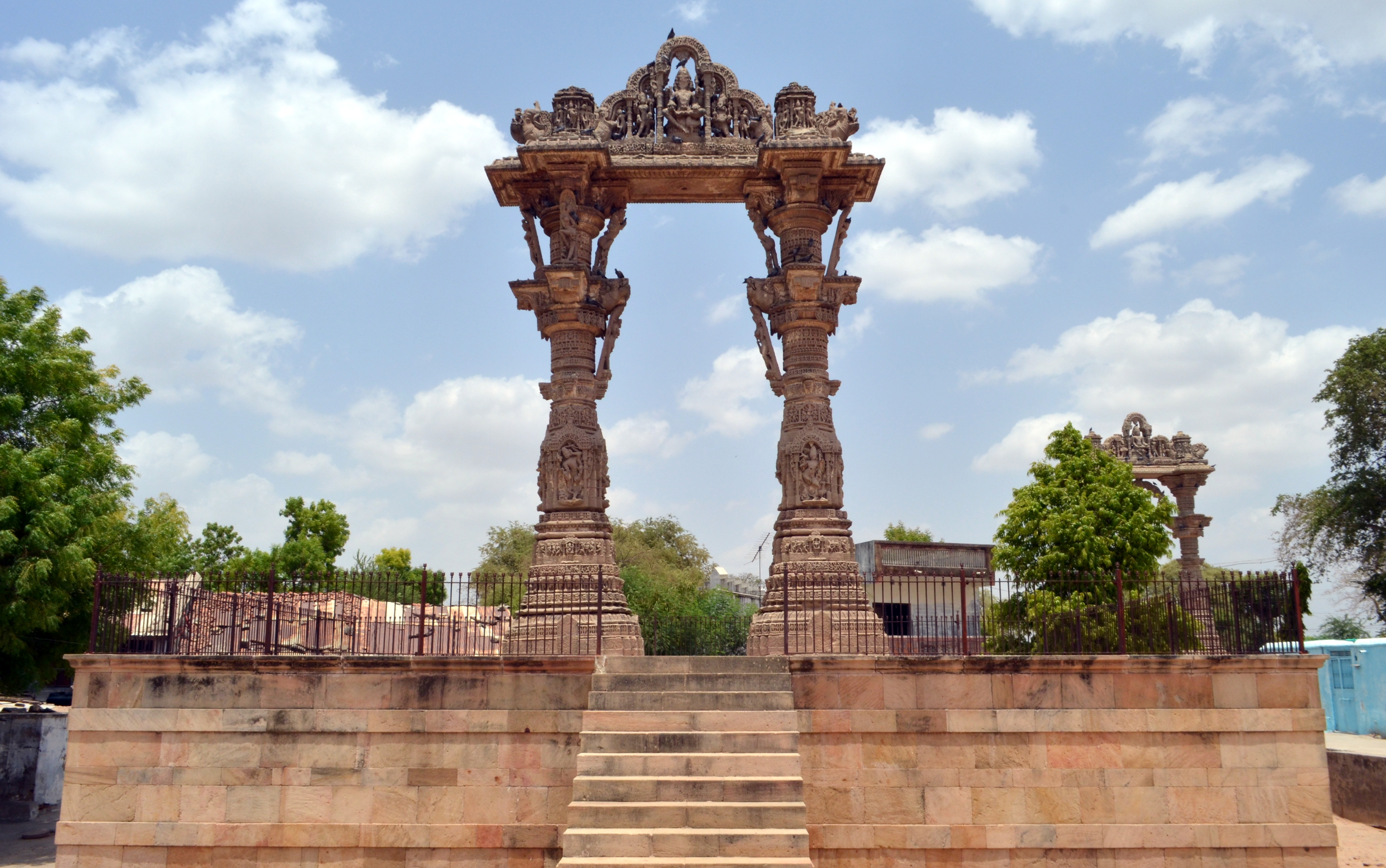
- The east Torana with parts of another visible in background
- Interactive map of the Kirti Toran area

General information
- Architectural style: Māru-Gurjara architecture (Chaulukya)
- Location: Vadnagar, Mehsana district, Gujarat, India
- Coordinates: 23.7908°N 72.6422°E

Technical details
- Material: Red yellow sandstone

Design and construction
- Designations: ASI Monument of National Importance (N-GJ-156)

Kirti Toran are two torana (ornamental gateways) located in Vadnagar in Mehsana district, Gujarat, India. Built in the 12th century, they are examples of Maru-Gurjara architecture.

== History ==
The two toranas belong to the 12th-century are located just north of the walled town. They stand on the bank of the Sharmistha Lake. The one to the east is in better condition and has been used as a symbol of Gujarat in recent times. Initially, one torana was intact while the other was ruined. The ruined one was re-erected in 2007 by the Archaeological Survey of India (ASI). The toranas might have served as an entrance to a large temple complex, but no remains of such have been found till date. It is the Monument of National Importance protected by the ASI.

The toranas were known as Narsinh Mehta's Chauri and was legendarily attributed to 15th century Gujarati poet Narsinh Mehta.

== Architecture ==
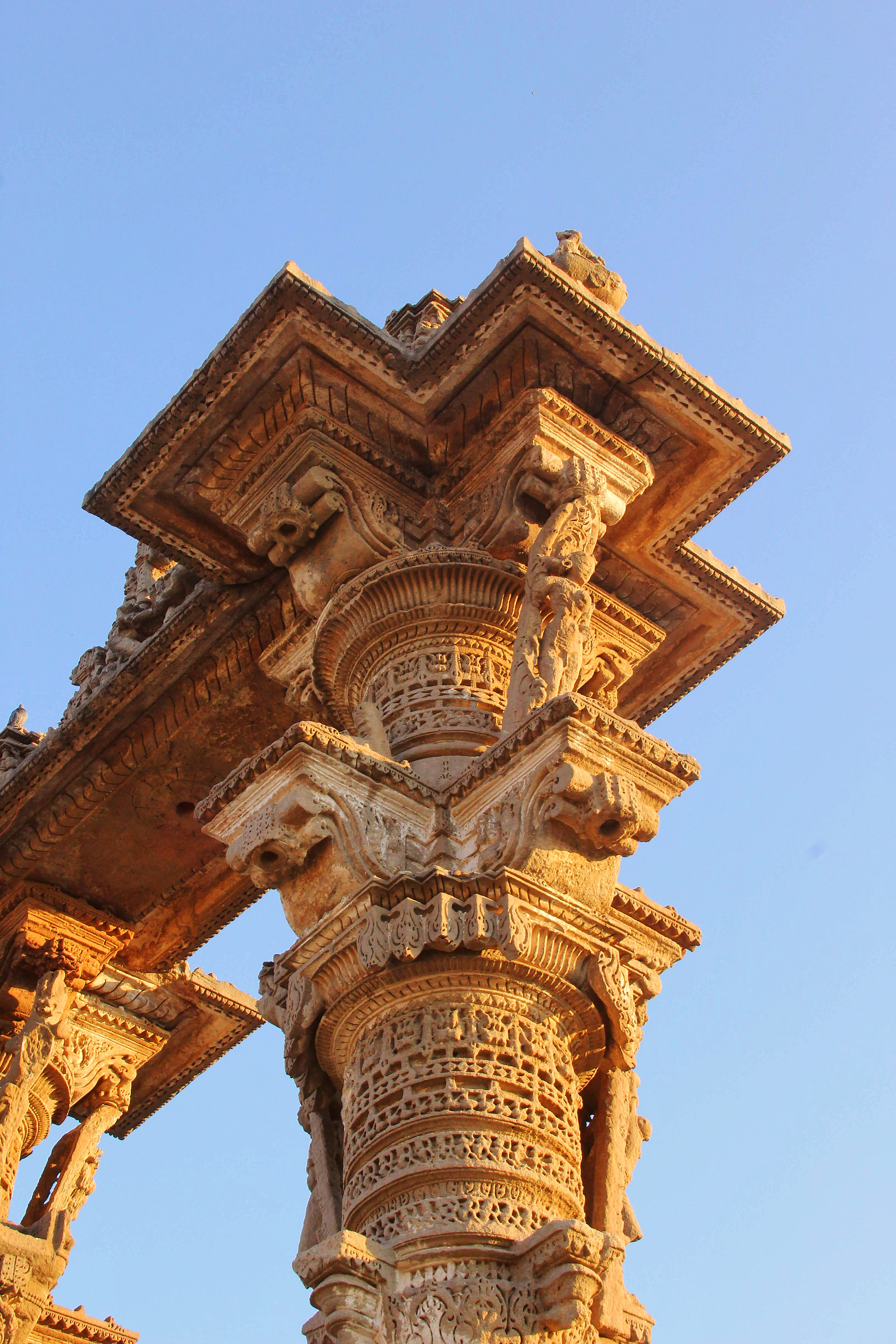
Carvings of the pillar capital

The toranas, a pair of columns supporting an arch, about 40 feet (12 m) tall, built in red and yellow sandstone. Both of them face the east with few houses in between them now. They are among the few surviving examples of the entrance gates, once a regular feature of the architecture of Gujarat in the Solanki period (Māru-Gurjara architecture). The carving style of them is similar to the pillars of the Rudra Mahalaya Temple at Siddhpur and the Modhera Sun temple, suggesting they belong to the same period. Perhaps erected after a war victory, the architecture is embellished with carvings of battle and hunting scenes. Their pillars and arches are decorated with lozenges at the base and geometric and floral designs (i.e., leaves, creepers and lotus), animal motifs, human figures engaged in various activities, and divine figures in different poses. The pillars feature elements like the Padma, Kani, Kirtimukhas, Gajathara, Narathara, and sculptured Kumbhi. The pillar capitals have pointed, carved leaves and support griffins and semi-circular arches. The top bears an image of a seated god Kartikeya flanked by Ganesh and Makara (a griffin), from which spring arches. A number of standing female figures also ornament the top.

== See also ==
- Vadnagar Archaeological Experiential Museum
