= Vadnagar Archaeological Experiential Museum =

- Former name: Vadnagar Museum
- Established: 16 January 2025
- Location: Vadnagar, Gujarat, India
- Coordinates: 23.7855°N 72.6455°E
- Type: Local museum, archaeological museum, history museum
- Curator: Design Factory India
- Architects: Meinhardt Singapore Pte Ltd (Design and Project Management Services including Construction Supervision)
- Owners: Directorate of Archaeology & Museums
- Parking: Yes

Vadnagar Archaeological Experiential Museum is an archaeology and history museum in Vadnagar, Gujarat, India. It was inaugurated in January 2025. It covers 2500 years history of continuous human habitation of the town as well as its cultural history. It displays more than 5000 artefacts and nearby excavated archaeological site is open to the visitors. Interior design and curation by Design Factory India.

== History ==
Vadnagar has several archaeological sites. The first excavation was carried out in 1953-54. The state archaeological department carried out further excavation between 2006 to 2012. In 2014, the Archaeological Survey of India (ASI) started the work and it continued from 2016-17 to 2022. The state archaeological department has yielded over 20,000 artefacts while ASI recovered another 40,000 to 45,000 artefacts. A part of these artefacts were displayed in the archaeological museum.

In 1996, the state government museum was established which had 147 exhibits in galleries. The museum building was demolished.

The new museum was built at estimated cost of ₹298 crore (US$31 million) in collaboration with the Gujarat State Directorate of Archaeology and Museums and Ministry of Culture. The museum was inaugurated on 16 January 2025 by Amit Shah, Minister of Home Affairs. It is the first experiential archaeological museum in India. It was opened to the public from 1 February 2025.

== Museum features ==
The museum complex is spread over 12,500 square metres (135,000 sq ft). The museum building has four floors.

The museum covers 2500 years history of continuous human habitation of the town as well as its cultural history. It has thematic galleries displaying more than 5,000 artefacts including ceramic assemblages, shell manufacturing, coins, weapons and tools, sculptures and idols, ornaments, playing objects and organic materials such as food grains, skeletal remains and DNA samples. The museum also feature interactive exhibits and audio-visual films. An excavated archaeological site spread over 4,000 square metres (43,000 sq ft) is connected with the museum by a 50 metres (160 ft) bridge. The site remains till depths of 16-18 metres can be viewed by the visitors from a walkway over the site. The site is covered under the shed and the ancient fort wall adjacent to it is restored. The museum has parking facilities and a cafe.

Galleries	Exhibits
Orientation Gallery	
City Gallery	Origin, history and development of Vadnagar
Belief Gallery	Vadnagar as a centre of Buddhism, Jainism and Hinduism
Lifestyle Gallery	Artefacts and exhibits displaying lifestyle of local people across the history including art, culture and language
Future Gallery	Future of humankind
Excavation Gallery	Orientation to the Amba Ghat excavation site

== See also ==
- Shristhal Sangrahalay
- Smritivan Earthquake Memorial and Museum
- Veer Balak Smarak
- National Maritime Heritage Complex
