= Vadnagar archaeological site =

Archaeological Site

- Interactive map of Vadnagar archaeological site
- 23°47′N 72°39′E
- Cultures: Mauryan, Indo-Greek, Indo-Scythian, Hindu-Solankis, Sultanate-Mughal, Gaekwad-British rule
- Location: Vadnagar, Gujarat, India

History
- Built: c. 730 BC

Site notes
- Excavation dates: 2016–present

Vadnagar archaeological site is located in Vadnagar in Gujarat, India; it is known for its significant findings of a continuing settlement since ancient or pre-Mauryan times.

== Project ==
Excavations at the archaeological site commenced in 2016 as a collaborative effort that includes archaeologists and experts from IIT Kharagpur, Archaeological Survey of India (ASI), Physical Research Laboratory (PRL), Jawaharlal Nehru University (JNU) and Deccan College. The joint study project, funded by Infosys Foundation and Government of Gujarat's Directorate of Archaeology and Museums, is intended to shed light on the period between the collapse of the Indus Valley Civilisation around 4,000 years ago and the emergence of Iron Age cities in northern India. Oxygen isotope analyses of extracted core samples were used to reconstruct climate variation at the site. Combined with stratigraphy, material cultural and textual evidence, and the radiocarbon dating, the proxy climate data were analysed in tandem with evidence of social, cultural and political conditions over the timespan of the settlement.

== Findings ==
A 2024 article detailing the joint study, published in Quaternary Science Reviews, suggests that the settlement in Vadnagar dates to 800 BCE. According to Anindya Sarkar of IIT Kharagpur, the lead author of the study, some of the unpublished radiocarbon samples date back to 1400 BCE. If the dating is confirmed, Sarkar points out this would demonstrate a cultural continuity in India for the last 5500 years.

=== Cultural stages ===
Vadnagar was a multicultural and multireligious settlement, its origins pre-dating Jainism and Buddhism. Over its three thousand year history, it has had seven distinct socio-cultural stages, and experienced successive rulerships, including Mauryan, Indo-Greek, Indo-Scythian, Hindu-Solankis, Sultanate-Mughal, and Gaekwad-British colonial rule. With continuous habitation since 800 BCE, it is identified as India's oldest living city within a single fortification.

=== Climate change impact ===
Using proxy data to reconstruct climate variation spanning the settlement's history, comparison of climatic conditions to socio-cultural and political conditions prevailing at the corresponding times was made. In this way, the study attempted to identify patterns of immigration or invasion, affluence and social conditions, that correlate with climatic vagaries. From this, the authors suggest that climate change, such as variable rainfall or droughts, played a significant role in the rise and fall of the culture, political stability, and social well-being at the site. In addition, periods of hyperaridity and increasing aridification in Central Asia were shown to correspond to periods of stable rainfall at the site; these factors are proposed as triggers for the waves of migration from Central Asia into the fertile areas of the subcontinent.

== See also ==
- List of World Heritage Sites in India
- UNESCO – Agency of the United Nations that promotes international cooperation in arts, education, science, and culture
- Vedic period – Ancient South Asian historical period
- Rulers and dynasties with associations to the history of the site (selected):
  - Chalukya dynasty – Classical Indian dynasty (543–753)
  - Chavda dynasty – Dynasty of ancient India
  - Gujarat under the Delhi Sultanate – History of Gujarat between 1297–1407
  - Western Kshatrapas – Indo-Scythian rulers of western and central India (35-415 CE)
  - Maitraka dynasty – Dynasty that ruled western India from c. 475 to 767
  - Gurjara-Pratihara dynasty – Northern Indian dynasty (730–1036)
  - Rashtrakutas – Early medieval Indian dynasty (753–982)
