= G. M. Mohamedally & Co. =

Gullamally, Mohammedally & Company (G.M. Mohammedally & Co.) was a major trading house in late 19th and early 20th century Ethiopia.

== Origins and foundation ==
Upon the outbreak of the First Italo-Ethiopian War in 1895, Sharafaly lent Ras Makonnen 100,000 thalers for the war effort. This was to be the inflection point in Sharafaly's fortunes; despite being fired by Banin for the unauthorized loan, following the Ethiopian victory in 1896 the Ras soon reciprocating by securing for Sharafaly a monopoly over coffee exports, and licences to export ivory, sheep, and cheetah skins.

== Operations ==
By early 1930s, the firm had 60 employees, mainly from India. These employees ran more than 40 branches within Ethiopia, and offices in Aden, Djibouti, Berbera, with its headquarters in Bombay.

=== Political influence ===
In 1904, the firm moved its head office to Addis Ababa, which was quickly outstripping Harar as a trade center, as well as being the country's political center. It was widely believed, but ultimately unproven, that the imperial family held stakes in the firm. It was reported that in 1901 Menelik II lent Sharafaly the vast sum of 2 million pounds sterling, which was assumed to be an equity investment; when the newly appointed finance minister Teklehawariat Teklemariyam reviewed the treasury's accounts in 1931, he found that the sum had remained outstanding for the prior three decades.

For some 20 years, the firm acted as agent and financial adviser to the powerful Bitwoded Haile Giyorgis Woldemikael, who variously served as Minister of Foreign Affairs, Minister of Commerce, Mayor of Addis Ababa. In 1923, the American Consul in Aden reported in a memo that Bitwoded Haile Giyorgis, confident that former (uncrowned) emperor Iyasu V would soon regain to the throne, had placed the deposed monarch's assets under the control of Mohammedally & Co. to "get the accounts in shape" in advance of the anticipated restoration. Shortly thereafter, Bitwoded Haile Giyorgis ended his association with the firm, leading to a long legal battle in which he sued the company for £45,000.

The firm also served as a vector for British influence in Ethiopia. In the late 1900s, it had agreements to preference the overland route to Khartoum for trade over the route to Djibouti. British diplomats regarded it as their primary link to the Ethiopian commercial world. As an indication of the depth of ties, branch managers were briefly appointed as acting British consuls in Harar and Dire Dawa in 1924 and Jimma in 1936.

== Italian occupation and dissolution ==
In the lead-up to the Second Italo-Ethiopian War, Mohammedally & Co. again engaged in various efforts on behalf of Ethiopia's defence. The firm attempted to raise funds amongst the Indian business community, and worked to gain the Aga Khan's interest in the project. Their success in this endeavor is unknown, although the Ethiopian government did send an envoy to Bombay for this purpose, and elders of the Indian community in Ethiopia recalling the receipt of funds.

As a result of its long connection to the Ethiopian government, the Italian occupation administration was suspicious of the firm, and following the assassination attempt on Governor-General Rodolfo Graziani, suspected it of complicity in the failed attack. The night following the attack, several grenades were lobbed at its premises in Arada; they failed to detonate, allowing them to be clearly identified as a type used by the Italian military. Shortly thereafter the firm was expelled from the country.

== See also ==
- Mohamedally Tower
