= Mohamedally Tower =

Shaikh Mohammad Ali Tower
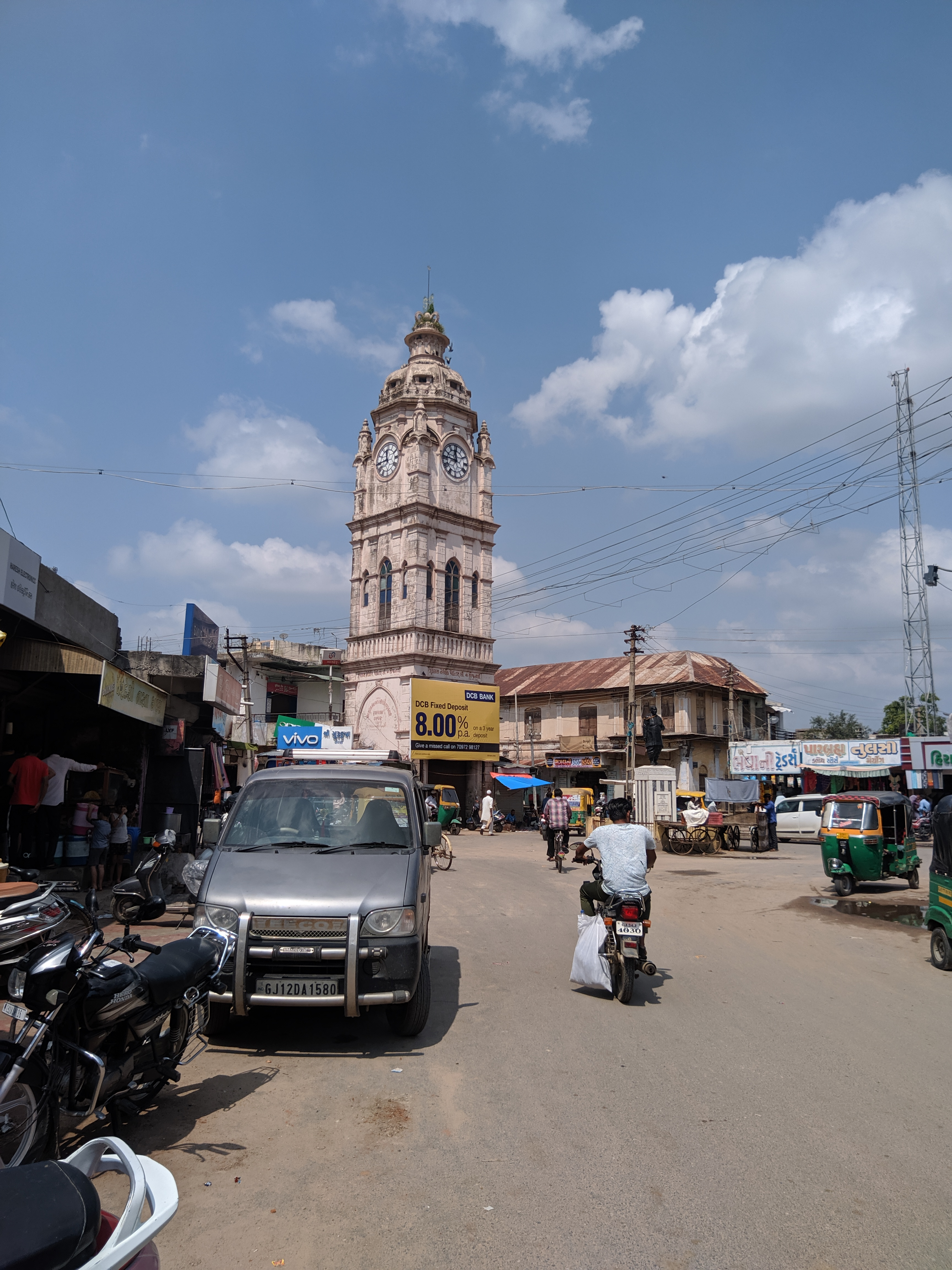
- Mohamedally Tower
- Interactive map of the Shaikh Mohammad Ali Tower area
- Alternative names: Muhammad Ali Tower, Shaikh Sharafali Tower, Siddhpur Tower

General information
- Type: Clock tower
- Architectural style: Indo-Saracenic architecture
- Location: Siddhpur, Gujarat, India
- Coordinates: 23.9192595787644°N 72.36997024328086°E
- Inaugurated: 4 April 1915
- Cost: ₹15,000 (equivalent to ₹3.8 million or US$40,000 in 2023)
- Client: G. M. Mohamedally & Co.
- Owner: Siddhpur Municipality

Height
- Height: 60 ft (18 m)

Mohamedally Tower (also spelled Muhammad Ali Tower), also known as Juna Tower or Shaikh Sharafali Tower, is a clock tower in Siddhpur, Gujarat, India. It was inaugurated on 4 April 1915.

== History ==
Mohamedally Sheikh Sharafally Hararwalla was a Dawoodi Bohra merchant from Siddhpur who owned the G. M. Mohamedally & Co. in Abyssinia (now Ethiopia). In 1914, on the occasion of marriage of his daughter, he illuminated Siddhpur for three months. The Gaekwad rulers of Siddhpur had gifted him an elephant. The Devdi gate of town was demolished for entry of that elephant for the marriage procession. As a compensation of the demolition, the clock tower was erected at the cost of ₹15,000 (equivalent to ₹3.8 million or US$40,000 in 2023). It was inaugurated on 4 April 1915 by prince Jayasingrao Sayajirao Gaekwad.

In 2018, the Siddhpur municipality has proposed to develop the tower as a monument.

The inscription on the tower reads:

Mohamedally Tower

Erected in grateful remembrance of Raj Ratna Mulla Mohamedally Sheikh Sharafally Hararwalla M.B.E., J.P. by His partners representing Messrs. G. M. Mohamedally & Co., for the benefit and good of Sidhpur subjects and opened at the hands of the lamented prince Jayasingrao Sayajirao on 4th. April, 1915.

Cost:- 15000/-

Engineer:- [missing]

== Architecture ==
The tower is 60 feet high and has clocks imported from Europe on its four sides. It is built in the British colonial architectural style with imperial crown on the top. It is considered as one of the most notable landmarks in the town.
