= Shristhal Sangrahalay =

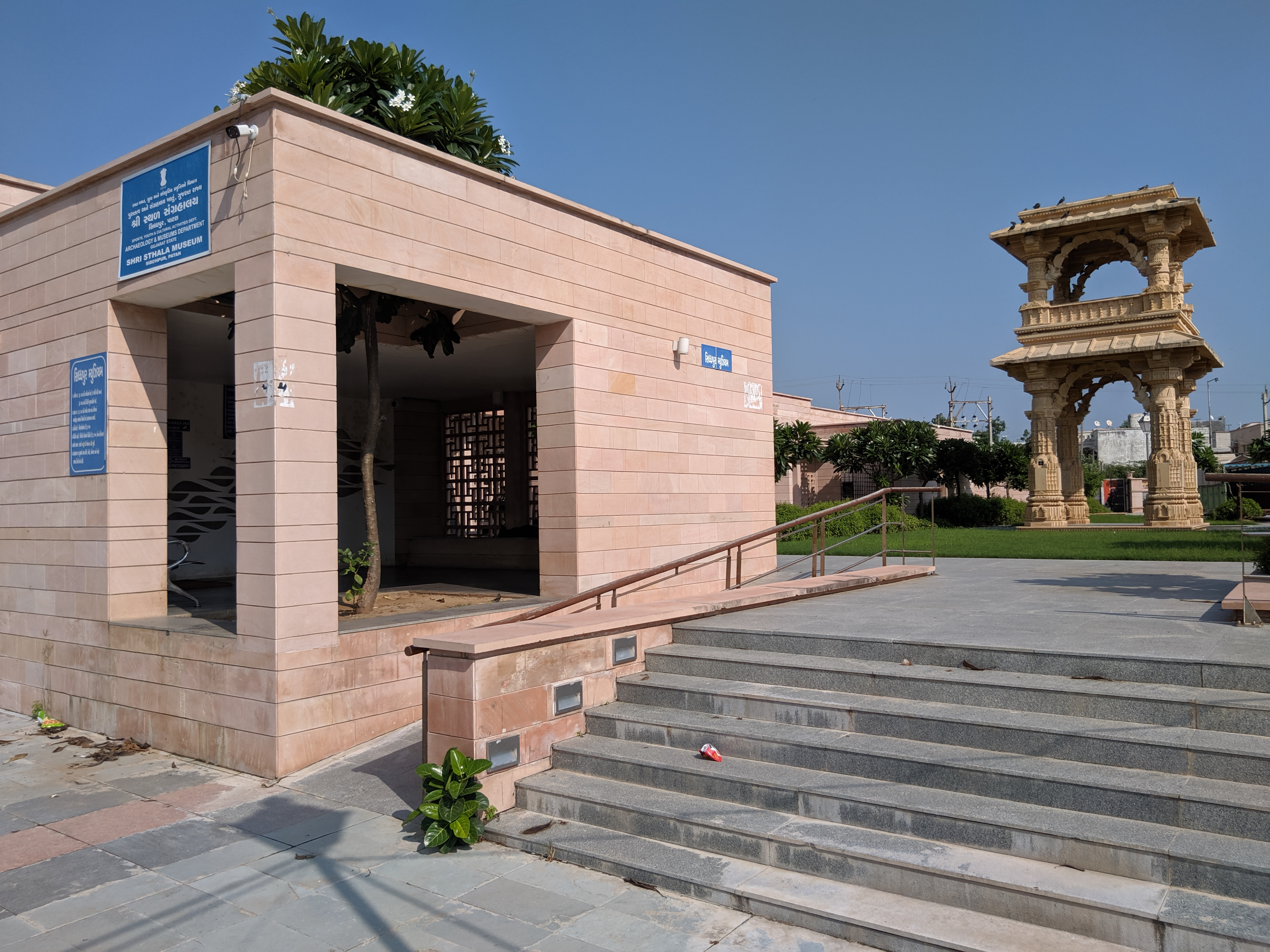
- Museum gate with replica of the torana gateway of the Rudra Mahalaya temple in background
- Former name: Siddhpur Museum, Bindu Sarovar Museum
- Established: 10 June 2017
- Location: Siddhpur, Gujarat, India
- Coordinates: 23.909244°N 72.363349°E
- Type: Local museum
- Owner: Tourism Corporation of Gujarat Ltd.

Shristhal Sangrahalay, also known as Siddhpur Museum or Bindu Sarovar Museum, is a museum located near Bindu Sarovar in Siddhpur, Gujarat, India. Opened in 2017, it has three galleries presenting religious and ritual significance as well as history and society of the region.

== History ==
State tourism minister Jaynarayan Vyas proposed a museum in Siddhpur in later half of 2010. It was estimated to cost ₹6 crore (US$630,000) in 2010. The museum was designed by the Shilanyas Design Consultants in 2012. It was inaugurated by the Gujarat State Chief Minister Vijay Rupani on 10 June 2017.

== Architectural theme ==
Bindu Sarovar is a religiously important pilgrimage site in north Gujarat where matru shraddh (post funereal rites of the mother) are held by Hindus. As the museum is located in the precinct of the Bindu Sarovar, the museum is constructed following its axis to present the continuity. A new diagonal path is added to it where the galleries are located. To include themes of religious and ritual significance as well as history and society of the region, three galleries are established titled Tirtha, Itihas and Samaj.

To present the ritual importance of the water as well as a sacred element, the water bodies are constructed around the museum building to have a visual connect for the visitor. The theme is also followed in the interiors.

== Galleries ==
The first Tirtha gallery presents religious and ritual activities held at Siddhpur. It is located on the lower level. The first circular chamber Garbhagriha is "dramatically" surrounded by natural light and water. It also include a theme of "primodial water" where life originates and ends to present the rituals associated with water at Bindu Sarovar. The wall frescoes narrates ten myths and legends associated with shraddh ritual.

The second Itihas gallery has artifacts, photographs and collections reflecting the history of the region. They include original artifacts as well as replicas sourced from various public institutions and private collections. The facades and models are included in the gallery as an architectural elements. The displays has natural or neutral tones and either smooth white (corian) or textured (granite) surfaces. These displays and the partitions guide the movement path of a visitor.

The third Samaj gallery highlights the societal and cultural aspects of the people living in the region. It is positioned above the Itihas gallery.

The museum also has a collection of historical artifacts as well as objects of everyday life. A replica of the torana gateway of the Rudra Mahalaya temple is constructed in the premises of the museum.
