= Vadnagar =

- Town
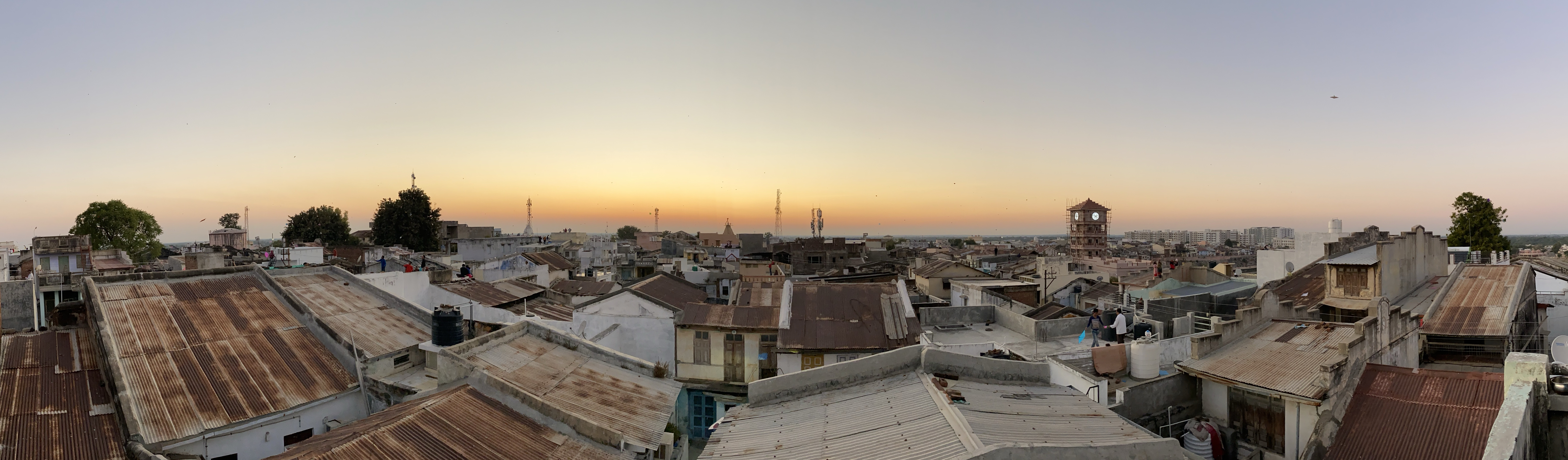
- Panoramic view of the town

- Location in Gujarat Location in India
- Coordinates: 23.785°N 72.64°E
- Country: India
- State: Gujarat
- District: Mehsana
- Region: North Gujarat

Government
  - Body: Vadnagar Municipality

Area
  - Total: 7.08 km^{2} (2.73 sq mi)
- Elevation: 143 m (469 ft)

Population (2011)
  - Total: 27,790
  - Density: 3,930/km^{2} (10,200/sq mi)

Languages
  - Official: Gujarati, Hindi, English
- Time zone: UTC+5:30 (IST)
- Postal code: 384355
- Vehicle registration: GJ-02

Vadnagar is a town and municipality in the Mehsana district of the state of Gujarat in India. It is located 35 km (22 mi) from Mehsana. Its ancient names include Anartapura (the capital of Anarta) and Anandapura. It was a location visited by Xuanzang in 640 C.E. The founder and the first Director-General of the Archaeological Survey of India (ASI), Alexander Cunningham, had identified Anandapura with the town of Vadnagar. Vadnagar is also the birthplace of Narendra Modi, the current Prime Minister of India.

== History ==
The archeological excavations presented sequence assigned from 4th-3rd century BCE to the present period. Recent excavations, in six trenches, consider the beginning of the site to be around 800 BCE, (ca. 2754 calibrated years before present).

Archaeologists found seven cultural periods of continuous human presence: 1) Pre-Mauryan, (ca. 800-320 BCE), (contemporary to Late-Vedic/pre-Buddhist Mahajanapadas or oligarchic republics), 2) Mauryan (ca. 320-185 BCE), 3) Indo-Greek, 4) Indo-Scythian or Shaka-Kshatrapas (ca. 35-415 CE), ('Satraps', descendants of provincial governors of the ancient Achaemenid Empire), 5) Hindu-Solankis, 6) Sultanate-Mughal (Islamic) to Gaekwad-British colonial rule (ca. 318 years before present), and 7) Recent.

Several ancient inscriptions and literary sources mention a town called Anartapura or Anandapura, identified as the area in and around the present-day Vadnagar. The epic tale Mahabharata mentions the Anarta Kingdom in the northern part of present-day Gujarat. The oldest Puranic legend about Gujarat is about a king named Anartha. The town is mentioned in the Tirtha Mahatmya section of the Nagara Khanda of the Skanda Purana, by the name of Chamatkarapura. The Junagadh rock inscription (dating from 150 C.E.) of the Western Kshatrapa King, Rudradaman I, mentions a region called "Anartha" (meaningless) in northern present-day Gujarat.

The Maitraka rulers of Vallabhi (505-648 C.E.) issued land grants to the Brahmins of Anarthapura or Anandapura. The Harsola copper plates (949 C.E.) of the Paramara king record the granting of two villages in Gujarat area to the Nagar Brahmins, who originated from Anandapura. which is also identified with Vadnagar, and is associated with the Nagar Brahmins. In 2009, archaeologists discovered a 4 km long fortification near Vadnagar, which they believe could be the historical Anartapura.

Vadnagar has also yielded an image of Bodhisattva dated back to the 3rd or 4th century C.E. This image may have been brought from Mathura to install in one of the town's Buddhist monasteries. Vadnagar's old town is found inside the walls of a fort with six gates: Kirti, Arjun, Nadiol, Amarthol, Ghaskol and Pithori. The town was added to the tentative list of the UNESCO World Heritage sites in December 2022.

== Geography ==
Vadnagar is located at 23.78°N 72.63°E. It covers an area of about 7.08 km^{2} (2.73 sq mi) and has an average elevation of 143 m (469 ft) above the mean sea level. It lies in a relatively flat and dry region, as compared to the rest of Gujarat.

== Climate ==
The climate in Vadnagar is generally cold during winters and hot in summers, with temperatures varying from 14 °C (57 °F) to as high as 42 °C (108 °F). The average annual rainfall is about 670 mm. Relative humidity is generally high, especially in the monsoon and post–monsoon months, because of the interiorly location of the town.

== Demographics ==
As of Census 2011, Vadnagar's population was 27,790, including 14,097 males and 13,693 females. Its female sex ratio is 971 compared to the state average of 919. Moreover, Vadnagar's child sex ratio is around 937 compared to the 890 state average. In Vadnagar, 12.26% of the population is under 6 years of age. Vadnagar's average literacy rate is 80.53%, higher than the 78.03% national average: male literacy is 90.41%, and female literacy is 70.42%.

== Economy ==
Almost the entire population of Vadnagar is engaged in agriculture and primary sector, because it is relatively isolated from the rest of Gujarat, as compared to other towns and cities like Mehsana, and developmental stages related to secondary and tertiary sectors are yet to be done. The primary sector accounts for around 40% of the total workforce. Another important industry on which the population is dependent is tourism, because in and around the town, there are many tourist attractions. Thus, it has a large potential yet to be tapped.

== Languages ==
Gujarati, being the state language of Gujarat, is spoken by most of the people in Vadnagar. Hindi and English are other common languages.

== Historic and cultural landmarks ==
- Sharmistha Lake: a lake with a small island, it is connected by a 7 km long inlet canal. The island has been developed into an urban park, including an open-air theatre.
- Buddhist monastery: The recent excavations have brought to light a Buddhist monastery belonging to the 2nd-7th century AD, within the fortified area of Vadnagar. The monastery had two votive stupas and an open central courtyard, around which initially nine cells were constructed. The arrangement of the cells around the central courtyard creates a swastika-like pattern.

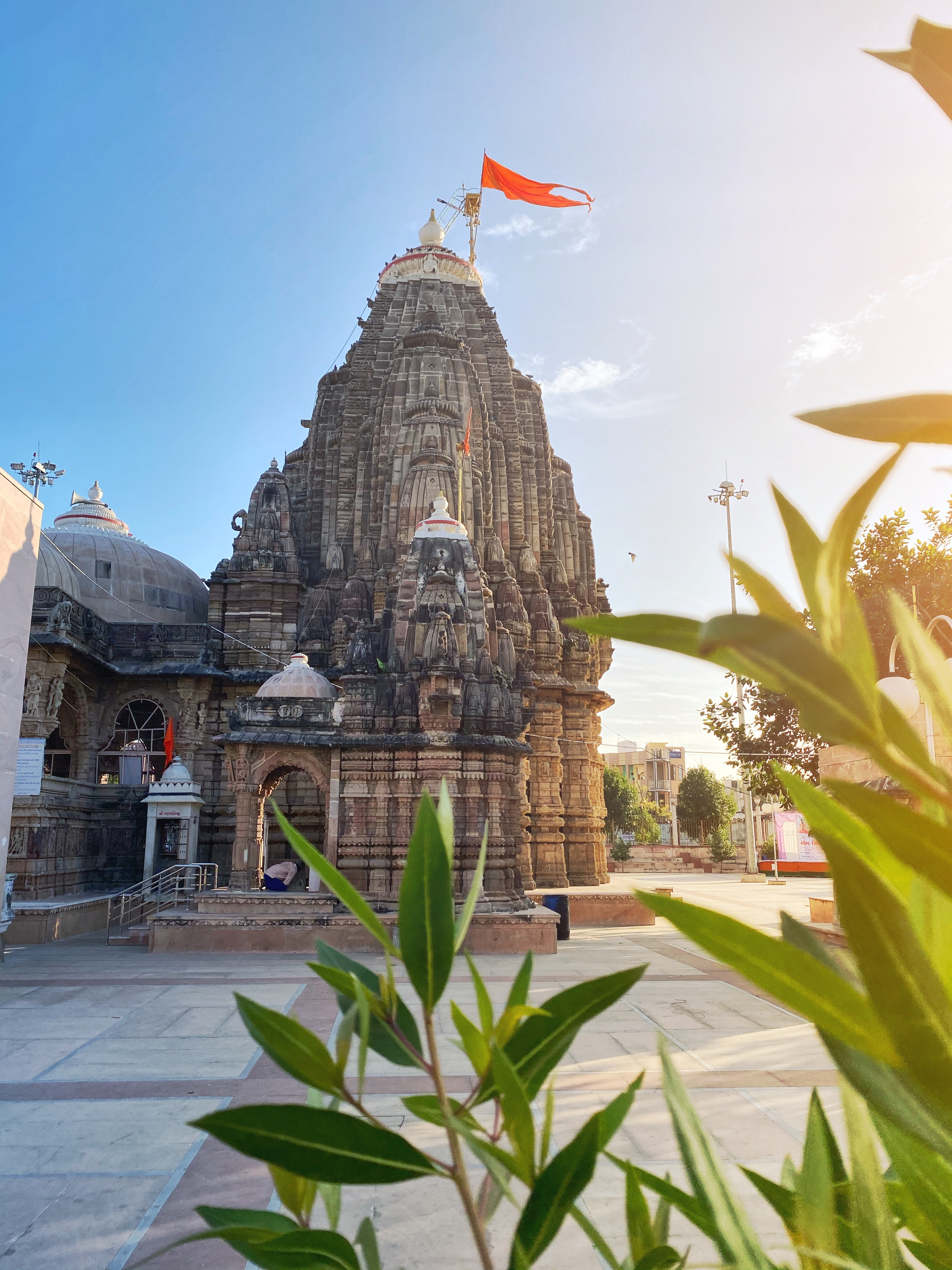
Hatkeshwar Mahadev Temple

- Hatkeshwar Mahadev Temple: It is a 15th-century temple, and is the most significant of the numerous Shiva shrines. He is the family deity of the Nagar Brahmins. Facing east, the temple is enclosed by a high wall surmounted by three circular domes, interspersed with flat stretches, symbolising the Indo-Saracenic architecture. From the roof of the sanctum sanctorum, a massive shikara rises high above into the sky. A massive congregation hall leads to the sanctum, which houses a Shiva linga, and is said to have self-emerged, or as it is said, swayambhu (lit. has self-emerged). The premises also have an ancient Kashivishveshvara Shiva temple, a Swaminarayan temple and two Jain temples. The temple's exterior is exquisitely and profusely decorated with the figures of nine planets, regent deities, the chief gods of the Hindu pantheon, scenes from the life of Krishna, Pandava princes Ramayana and Mahabharata, musicians, dancing apsaras, as well as varied animal and floral motifs.
- Sitala Mata Temple: It is ornately carved with figures of celestial beings. Its door frames and ceilings depict the Rasmandala, portraying Krishna dancing with milkmaids.

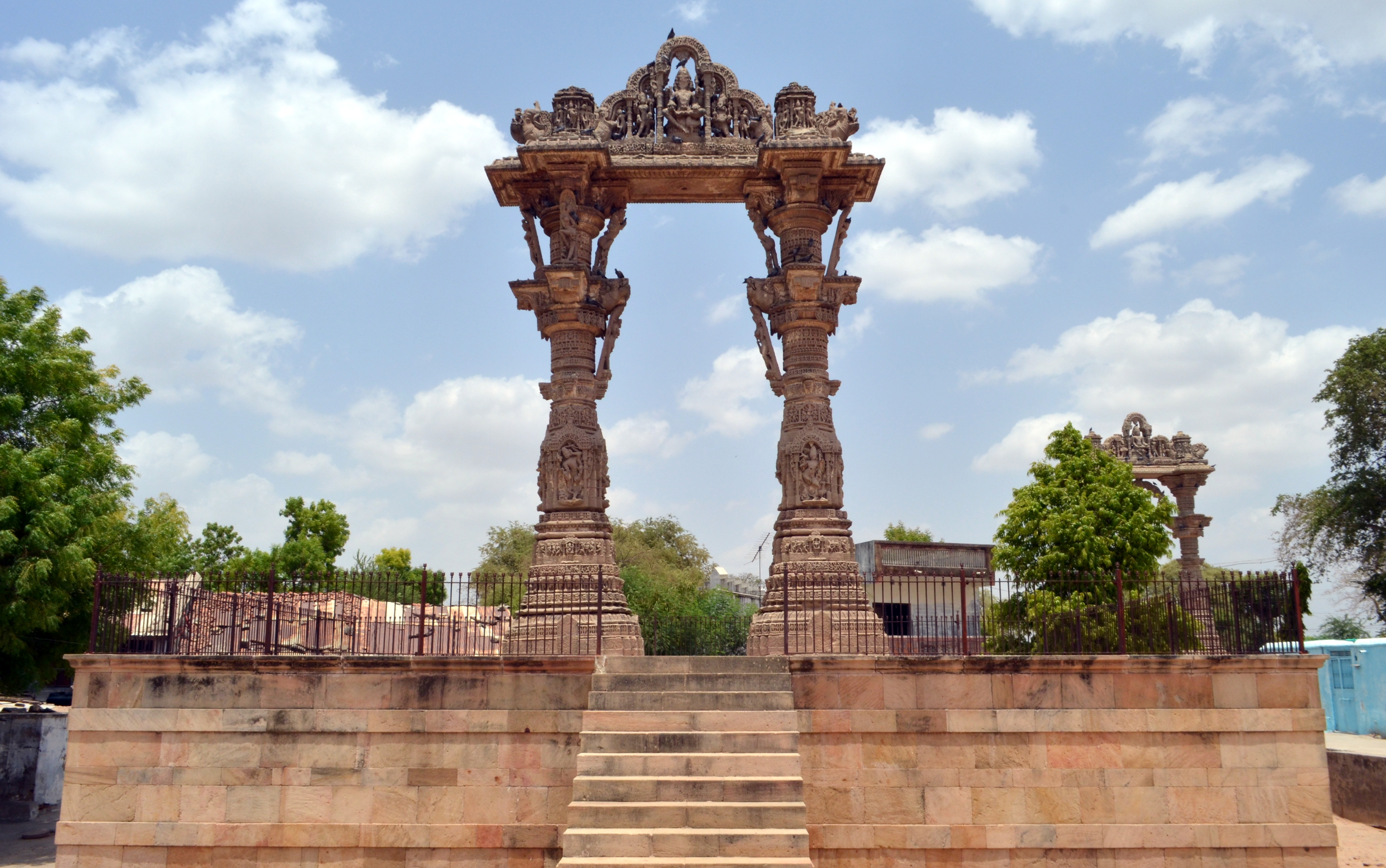
Kirti Toran

- Vadnagar Archaeological Experiential Museum was built at an estimated cost of ₹298 crore (US$31 million). It was inaugurated on 16 January 2025. It is the first experiential archaeological museum in India. It was opened to the public from 1 February 2025. It covers 2500 years history of continuous human habitation of the town as well as its cultural history.
- Kirti Toran: The town is famous for its two toranas, a pair of 12th-century columns supporting an arch, about 40 feet tall built in red and yellow sandstone, just north of the walled town. They stand on the bank of the Sharmistha Lake. Their pillars and arches are decorated with lozenges at the base and geometric and floral designs (i.e., leaves, creepers and lotus), animal motifs, human figures engaged in various activities, and divine figures in different poses. The one to the east is in better condition and has been used as a symbol of Gujarat in recent times. Initially, one torana was intact while the other was ruined. The ruined one was re-erected in 2007 by the Archaeological Survey of India (ASI). The toranas might have served as an entrance to a large temple complex, but no remains of such have been found till date.

Other places include Tana-Riri garden and shrine, Gauri kund, Pancham Mehta's Vav (stepwell), Janjanio well, Baithakji of Gusaiji, an ancient library and a directional stone from the Solanki period.

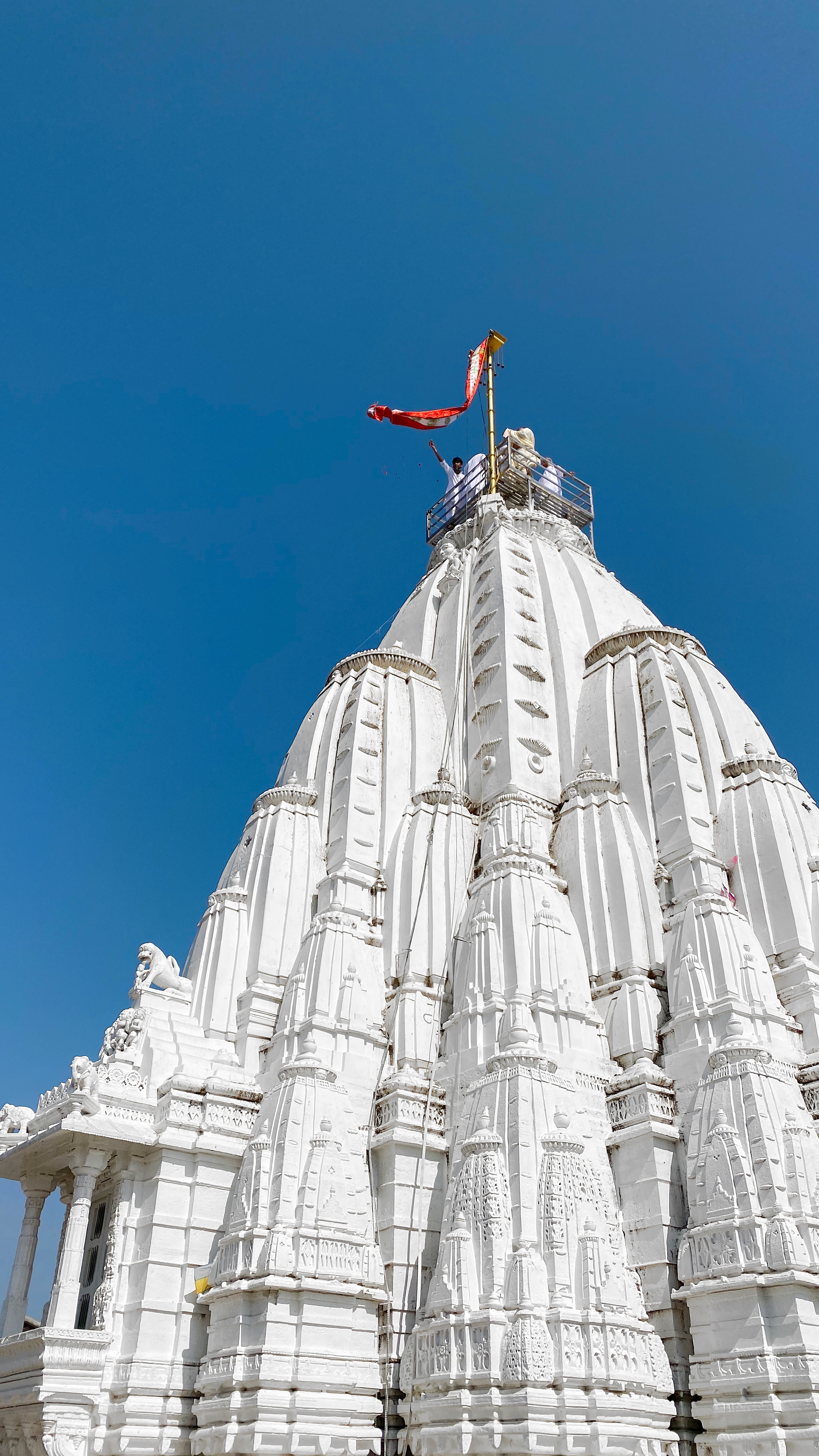
Hathi Jain temple

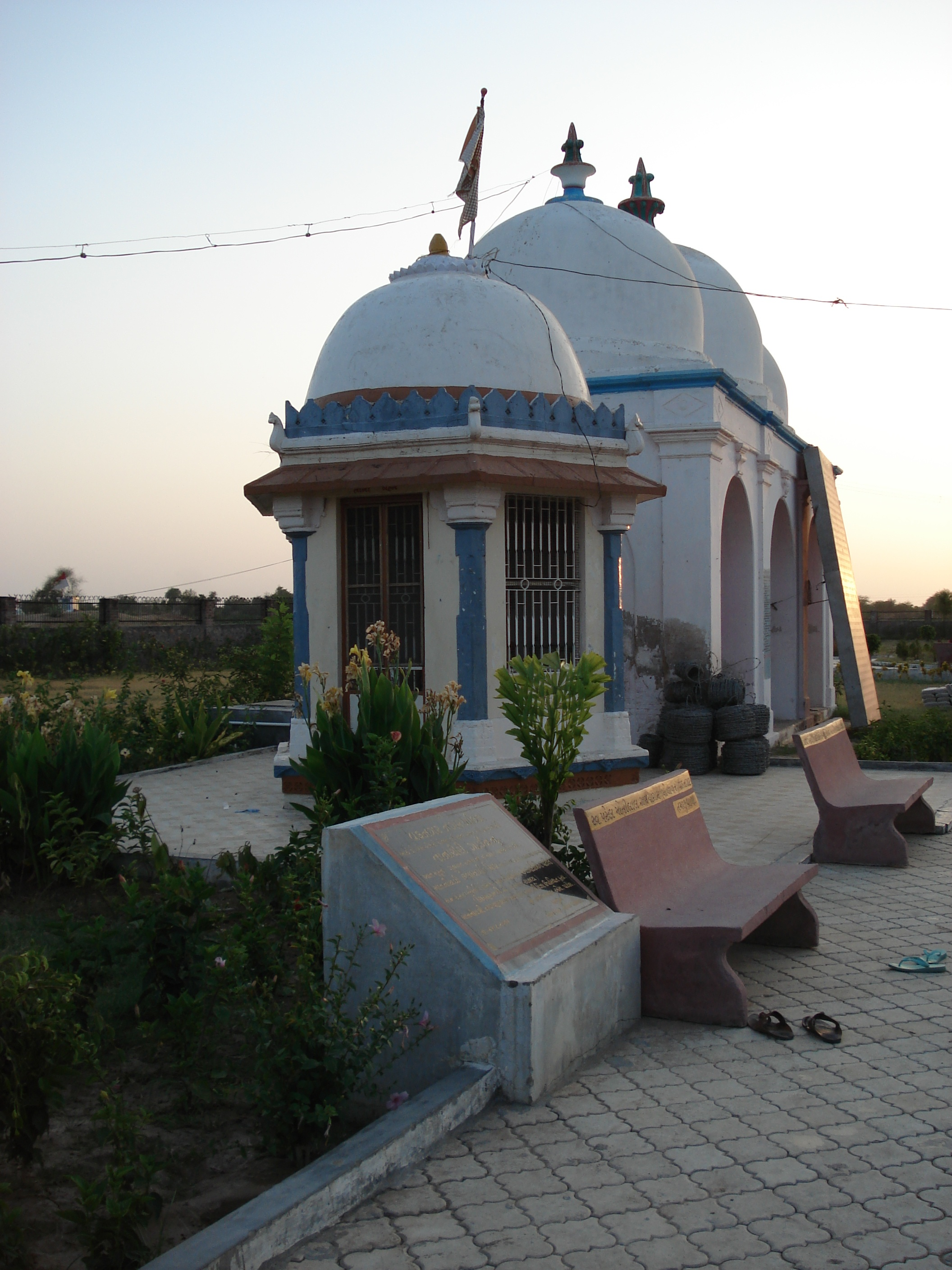
Tana-Riri garden and shrine

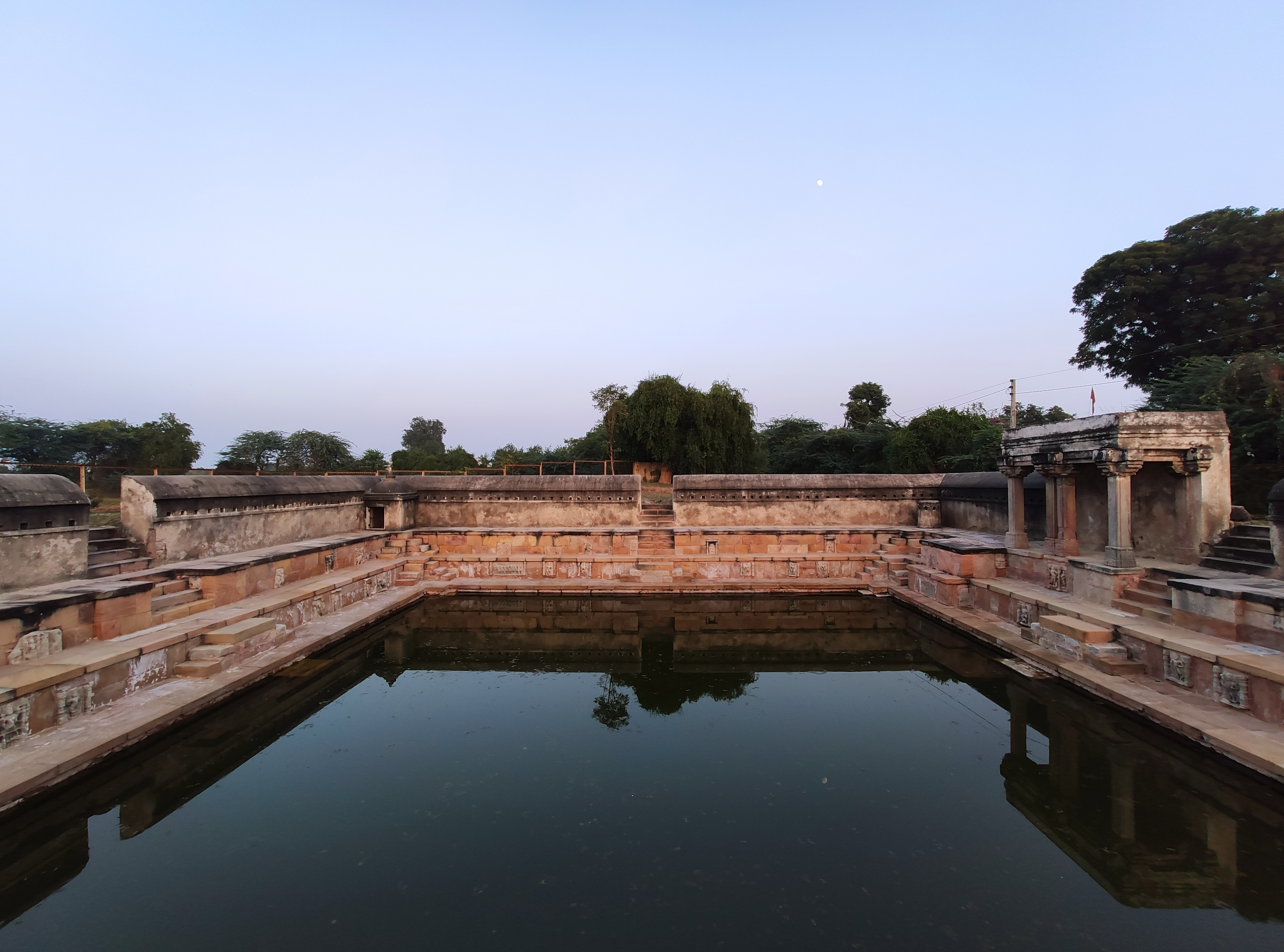
Gauri kund

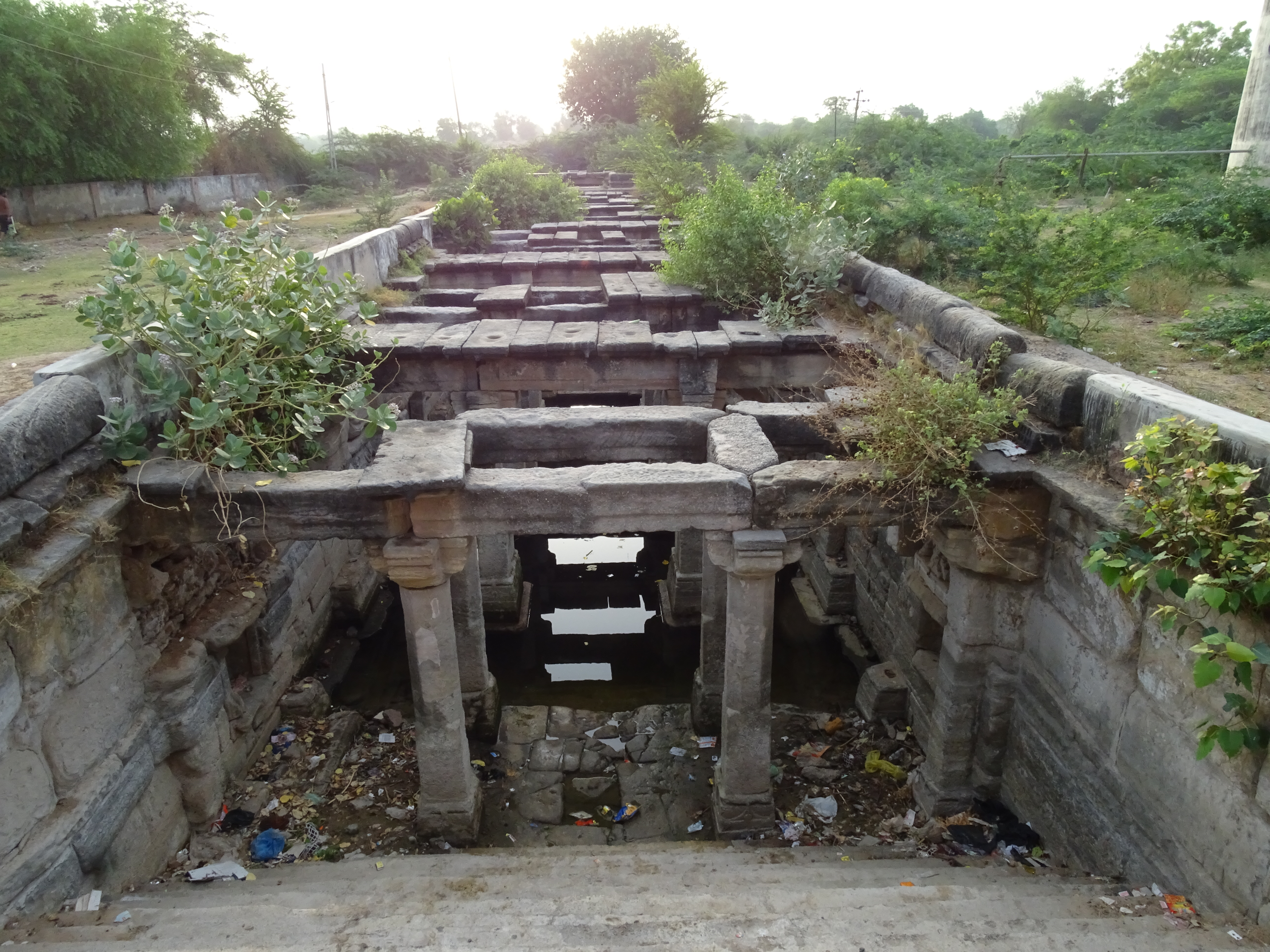
Pancham Mehta's Vav

There are many temples, dedicated to almost every god in Hinduism:

- Shiva:
  - Dwaneshwar Mahadev Temple,
  - Somnath Mahadev Temple and
  - Kashi Vishveshvara Temple,
- Vishnupuri Temple,
- Chhabila Temple,
- Hanuman Temple,
- Ashapuri Mata Temple,
- Ambaji Mata Temple,
- Sitla Mata Temple,
- Bhuvaneshpuri Temple,
- Amther Mata Temple,
- Gauri kund and
- Swaminarayan Temple.

There are remains of a Buddhist monastery dating from the 7th century C.E., as well as two Jain derasars.

== Education ==
Schools

- Anarth Shikshan Kendra
- Shri B. N. High School
- Jawahar Navodaya Vidyalaya
- Navin Sarva Vidyalaya
- Pattharwali School
- Royal English Medium School
- Saraswati Vidya Mandir
- Sarvajanik Vidyayalaya, Vaghasi
- Vadnagar Girls High School

Colleges

- Arts and Commerce College, Vadnagar
- GMERS Medical College, Vadnagar
- Government ITI, Vadnagar
- Government Polytechnic, Vadnagar
- Government Science College, Vadnagar

== Healthcare ==
Hospitals

- Bhavna Hospital
- Drishti Hospital
- GMERS Medical College & Civil Hospital
- Sadbhavna Hospital
- Sardar Patel General Hospital
- Vadnagar Nagrik Mandal Hospital
- Vasant Prabha Hospital

== Transport ==
=== Road ===
The Gujarat State Highway 56 (SH-56) passes through Vadnagar, that connects it directly with Mehsana, Visnagar and Ambaji.

=== Rail ===
The Vadnagar railway station lies on the Mehsana-Taranga line, that directly connects Vadnagar with the rest of the state and beyond through Mehsana Junction railway station.

=== Bus ===
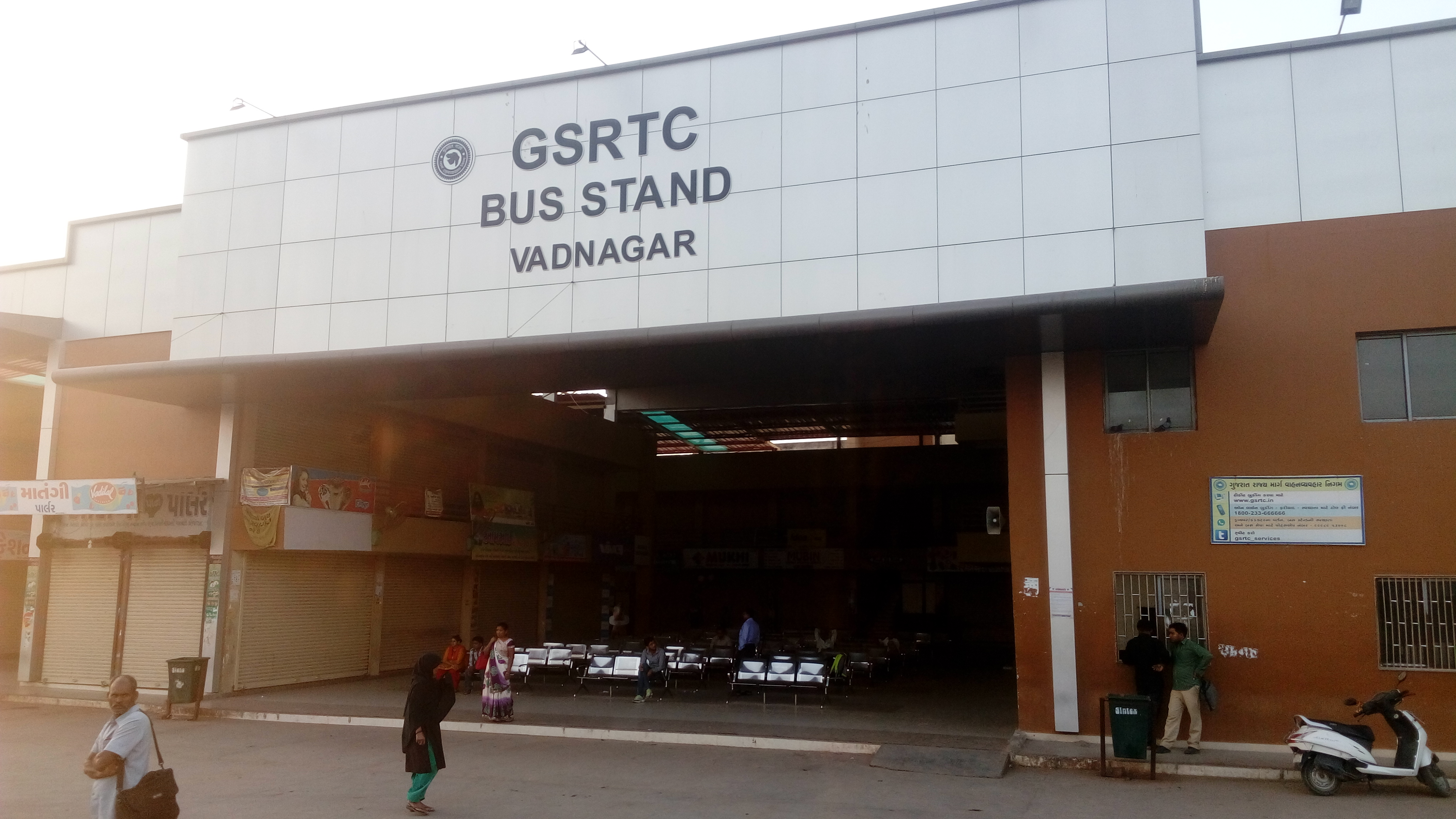
Vadnagar bus stand

The Vadnagar bus station is located within the centre of the town. Buses are available from here to all major towns and cities in Gujarat and neighbouring states, that operate under Gujarat State Road Transport Corporation (GSRTC), private and tourism operators.

=== Air ===
The nearest airport is Mehsana Airport, located 36 km (22 mi) south-west from Vadnagar at Mehsana. However, currently, the airport is only used for private and government purposes, not for civilian or passenger services. Hence, the nearest operational airport is Sardar Vallabhbhai Patel International Airport, located 93 km (58 mi) south from the town at Ahmedabad.

== Notable people ==
- Narendra Modi, 14th and current Prime Minister of India
- Shankar Chaudhary, politician, current speaker of Gujarat Legislative Assembly, former Minister of State for Health and Family Welfare, Medical Education, Environment (All Independent charges) and Urban Development, Government of Gujarat
- Asit Kumarr Modi, Indian TV producer and actor, known for Taarak Mehta Ka Ooltah Chashmah
- Vasant Parikh, Indian politician

== See also ==
- Mehsana
