= Siddhpur =

Town in Gujarat, India

Siddhpur Sidhpur
- Town
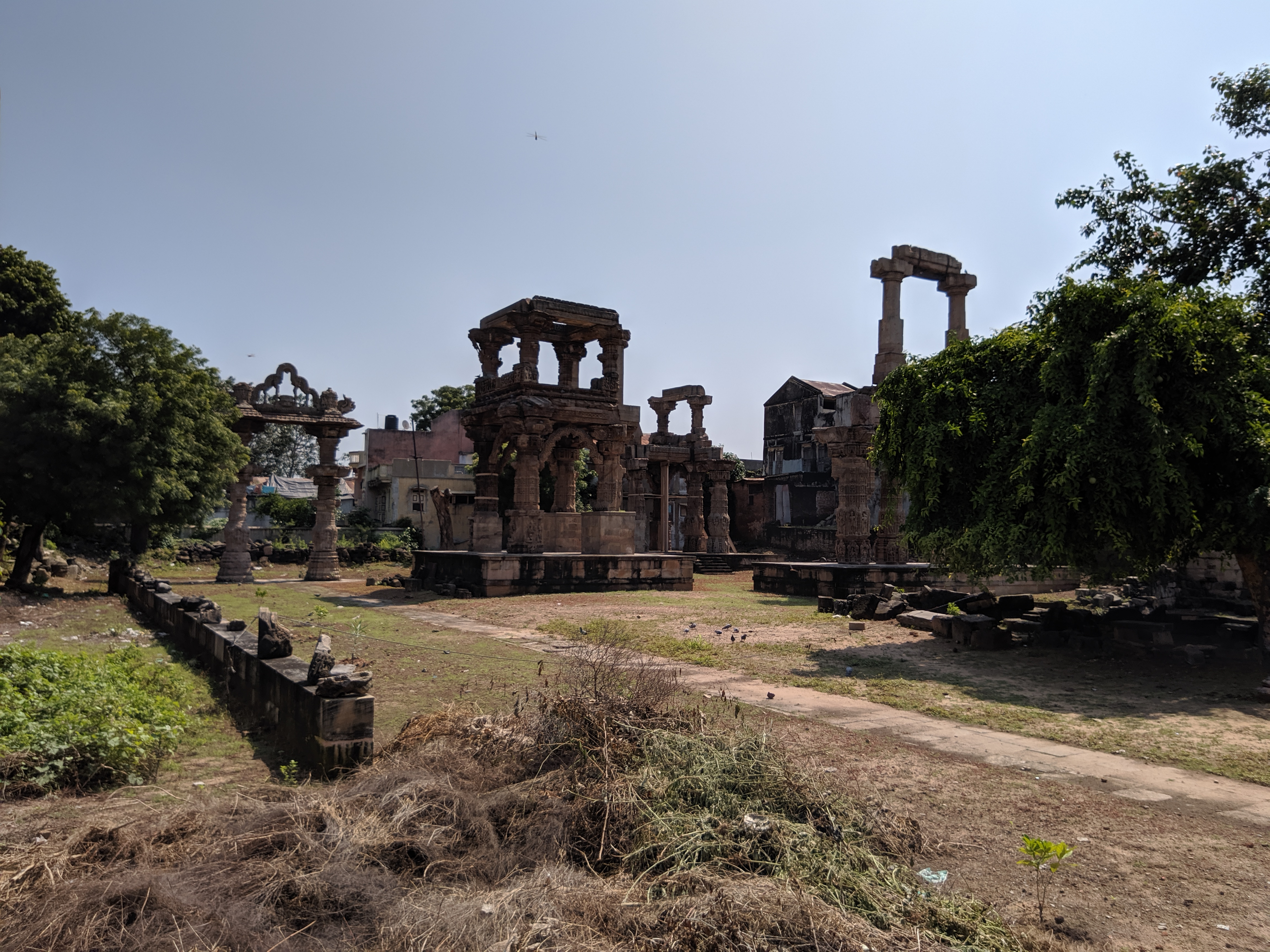
- Ruins of Rudra Mahalaya temple

- Location in Gujarat, India Siddhpur (India)
- Coordinates: 23.9167°N 72.3833°E
- Country: India
- State: Gujarat
- District: Patan
- Named for: Jayasimha Siddharaja

Government
  - Type: Municipal Council
  - Body: Siddhpur Municipal Council

Area
  - Total: 20.26 km^{2} (7.82 sq mi)

Population (2011)
  - Total: 61,867
  - Density: 3,054/km^{2} (7,909/sq mi)

Languages
  - Official: Gujarati, Hindi
- Time zone: UTC+5:30 (IST)
- PIN: 384151
- Telephone code: 02767
- Vehicle registration: GJ-24

Siddhpur, also spelled Sidhpur, is a Town, municipality and headquarter of Sidhpur taluka in Patan district, in the Indian state of Gujarat. It is a historical place located on the bank of the endorheic Saraswati River, which is probably a remaining of the ancient Sarasvati River.

== History ==
Siddhpur was historically known as Sristhal, literally "a pious place".

The bard sings of it,

Tirath bhumipavan Siddhakshetra subhasar,
Nirmal nir vahe Sarasvati sada mokshko dwar, ... —

"A Tirtha, a place to make holy, is the good Siddha Kshetra,
Where flows Sarasvati's pure stream — ever beatitude's door.
A city three worlds to purify, by Siddhs ever worshipped,
Gods, Rishis, and men cherish the desire to live there.
And there dwell devas unnumbered, as a tirtha regarding it, —
Of Kasi, Gaya, Godavari, and all other tirthas, the best ;
Where Kardam and Dehuti lived, and Kapila was born.
Here is Bindusarovar's pure fount, and Matrugaya;
Applied to the bodies of men degraded and fallen, it washes their myriads of sins.
Here is Prachi Mahadev, whose renown by Veda and Purana is sung:

Of all Tirthas, the essence — it is named Kapilashram."

In tenth century (943 AD), Mularaja, the founder of Chaulukya dynasty, started constructing the Rudra Mahalaya Temple. On completion of the temple, around 1140 AD, Jayasimha Siddharaja consecrated it and established the town as his capital. He changed its name to Siddhpur, literally Siddhraj's town. The temple was dismantled by an army under Almas Beg (Ulugh Khan) and Nusrat Khan sent by Alauddin Khalji in 1298–99.

During the Gujarat Sultanate, the town was under the rule of local dynasty ruling from Palanpur. In the 15th century, the town was brought under the Mughal rule by Akbar. Under the Mughal rule the Hindu heritage of the town deteriorated further and the Rudramahalaya temple fell into ruins.

Asaita Thakar, traditionally credited for the origin of traditional folk theatre Bhavai, in 14th century, lived in Siddhpur.

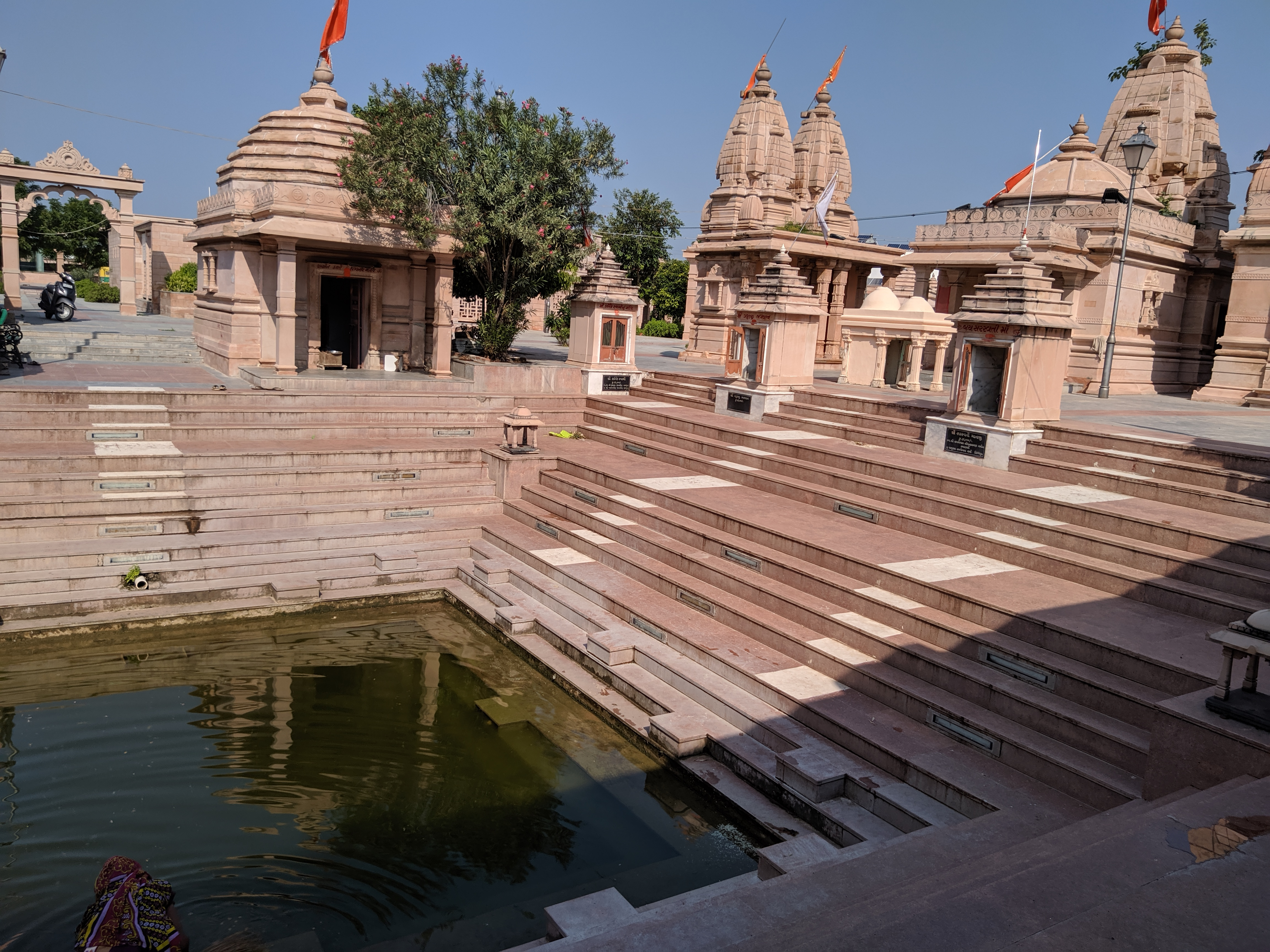
Bindu Sarovar

Siddhpur is associated with performing śrāddha for mothers, and several Puranic accounts are connected with this. According to Puranic tradition, Kapila's ashram was in Siddhpur, and his mother Devahutī turned to water after receiving brahmajñāna from Kapila. Another account states Paraśurāma bathed in Kaplilāśrama's Bindu Sarovar and conducted his mother Reṇukā's śrāddha and thus became cleansed of the sin of decapitating her on the order of his father. The city has a high population of Śaiva Siddhpuriyā Brahmins and Vorā people. Pilgrims bathe in the Sarasvatī river, Gyānvāpi, Alp Sarovar, and Bindu Sarovar. Excepting the monsoon season, these bodies of water are dirty. Bindu Sarovar rather than a sarovar ("pond") is actually a kuṁḍ ("square tank with steps leading to water") and is surrounded by a few small temples. Alp Sarovar is also actually a kuṁḍ.

== Architecture ==
Sidhpur is called the Paris of Gujarat because it has a Bohra mansion whose architecture is as amazing as Paris.

The Dawoodi Bohras, a trading community, flourished in Sidhpur from the 1820s to the 1930s. They built monumental mansions, made of wood, with stuccoed facades, ornate pilasters, trellised balconies and gabled roofs which have become identifying features of the architecture of this town. The façades of these houses are in a hue of pastel colours - pink, lilac, lime green, peach, lemon, beige and the like and every house façade has an intricate monogram with the initials of the owners (in Latin text). Sebastian Cortés has captured detailed photographs of these architectural marvels which were displayed at an exhibition in Mumbai, India. On Sidhpur, Cortés said, "I would feel safe to say that it incorporates elements that span from neoclassical European, including art nouveau, and touching Indian Gothic. But if you begin to look closely, you can find other influences; this variety makes Sidhpur a marvel for the eye."

== Demographics ==
As of 2001 census of India, Siddhpur had a population of 53,581, of which 52% were male and 48% female. Siddhpur had an average literacy rate of 71%, higher than the national average of 59.5%: male literacy was 77%, and female literacy was 64%. In Siddhpur, 12% of the population is under 6 years of age.

== Places of interest ==
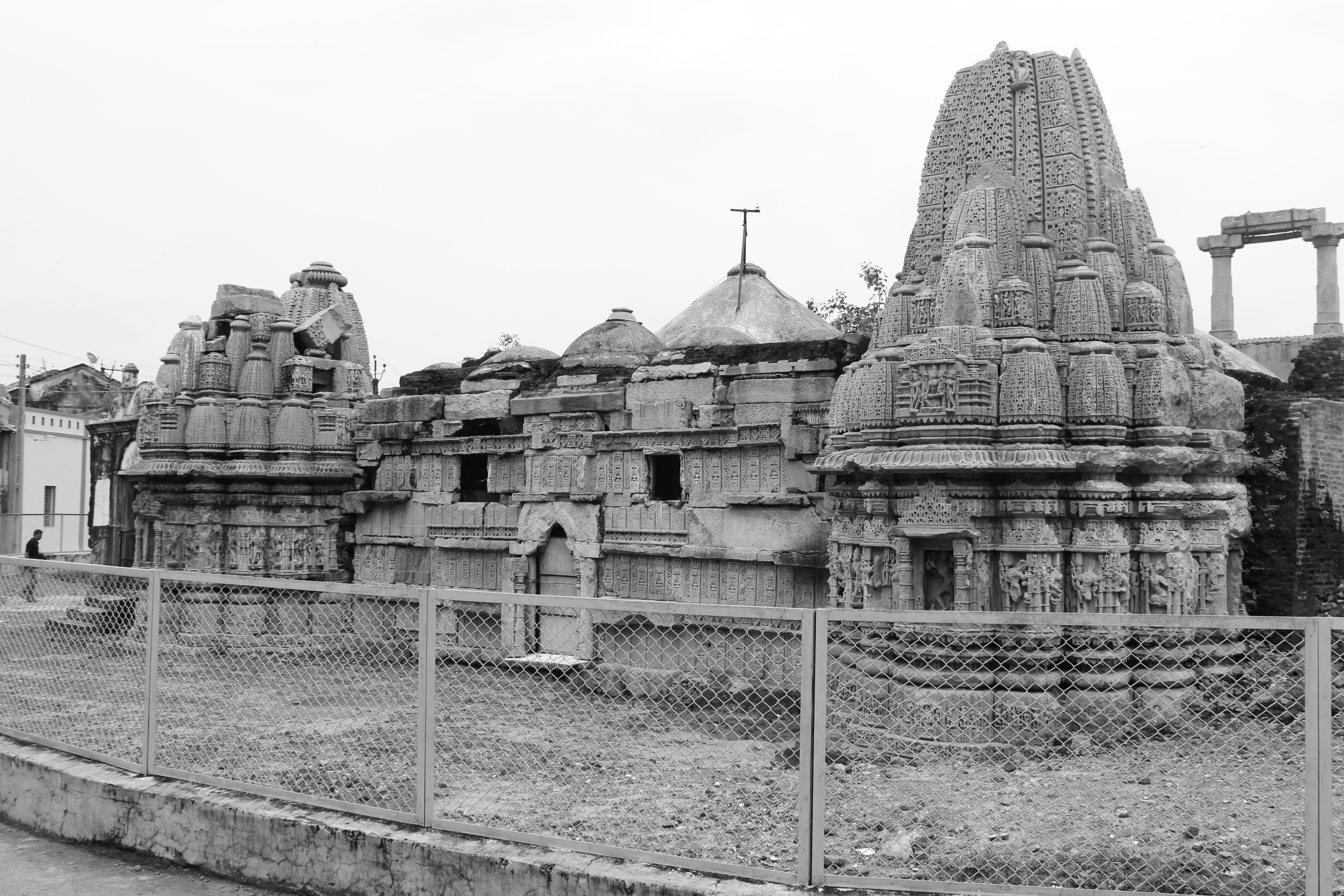
Ruins of Rudramahal

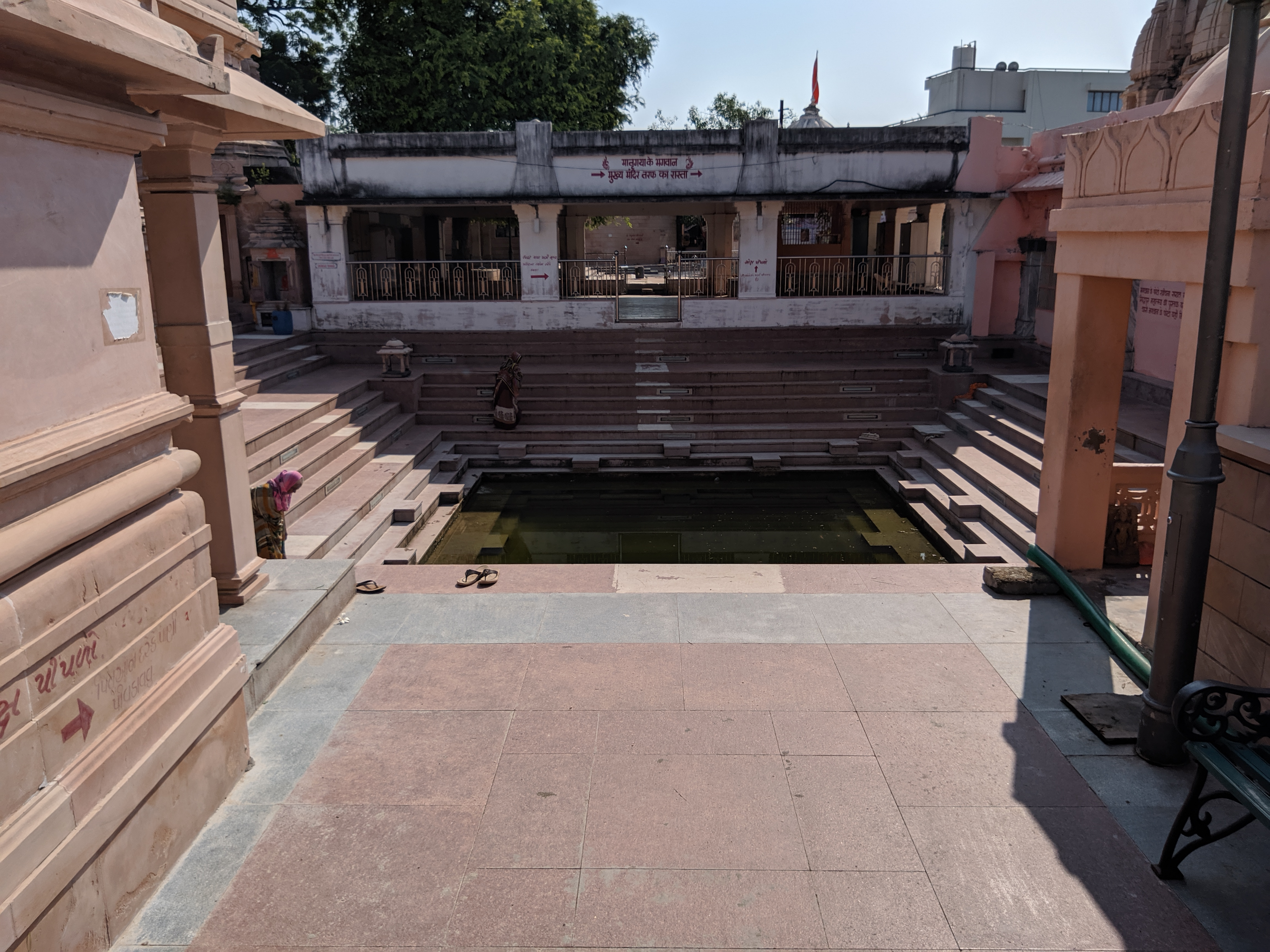
Bindu Sarovar (Matrugaya)

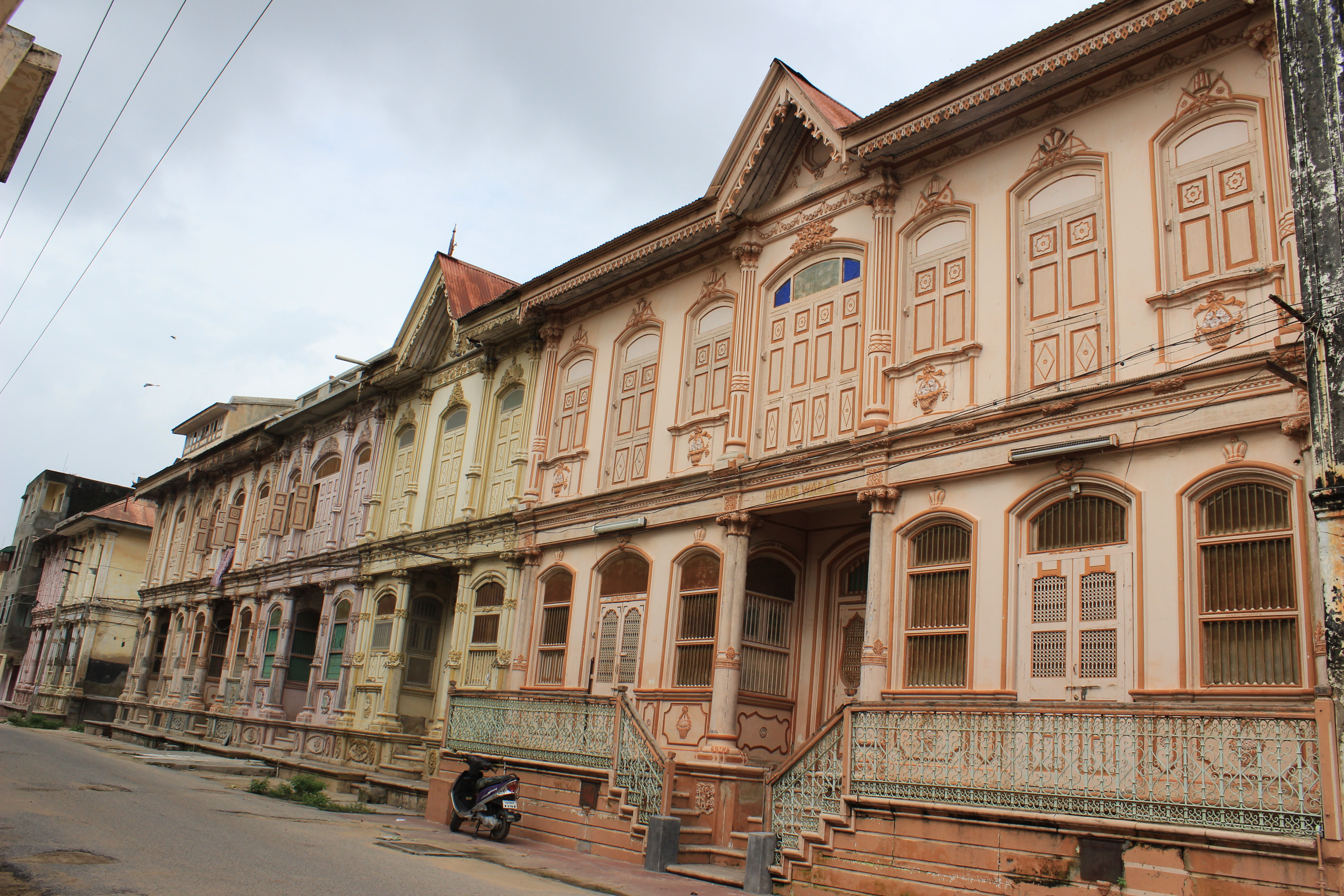
Havelis (mansions) of Dawoodi Bohra community

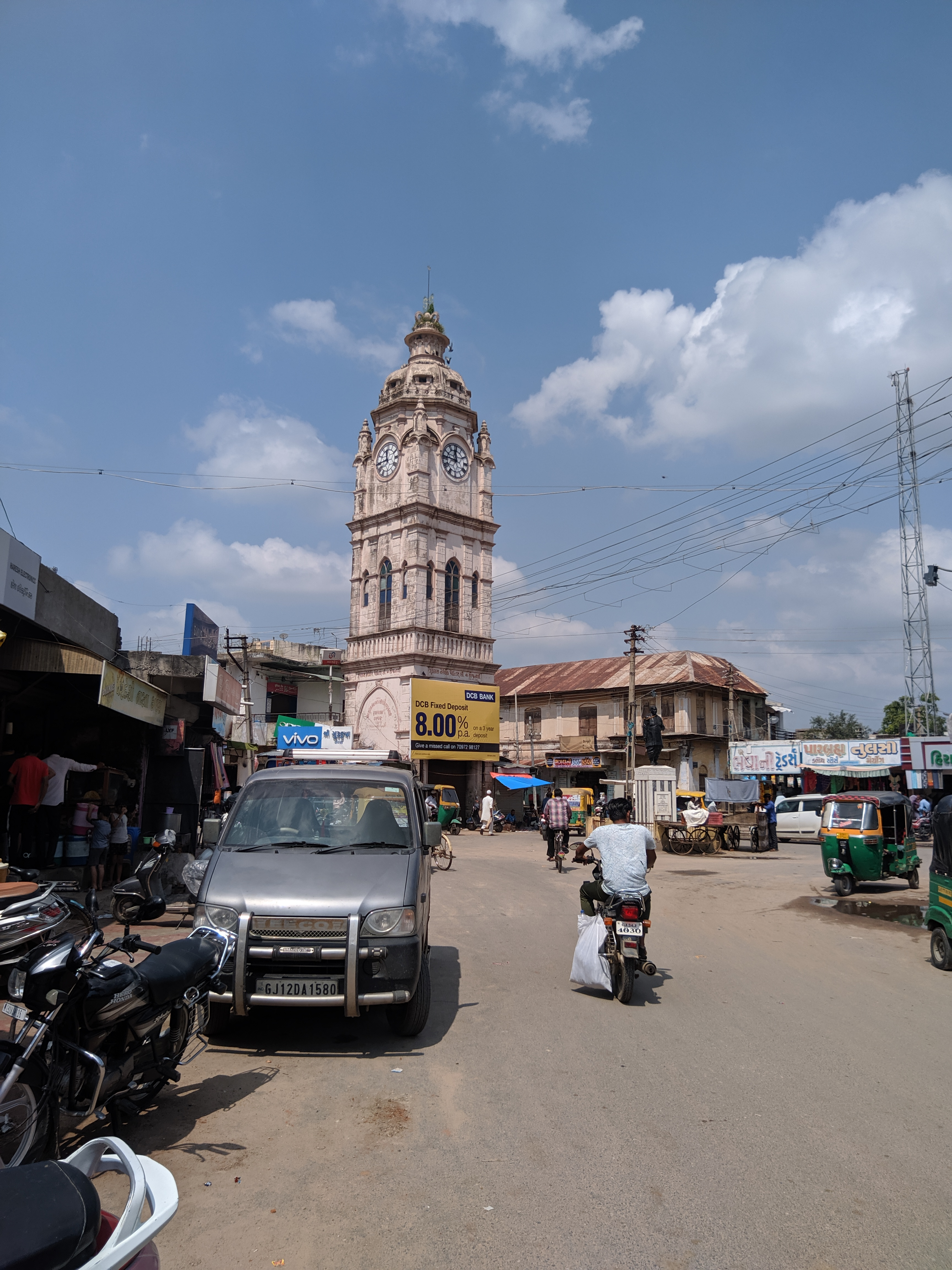
Mohamedally Tower

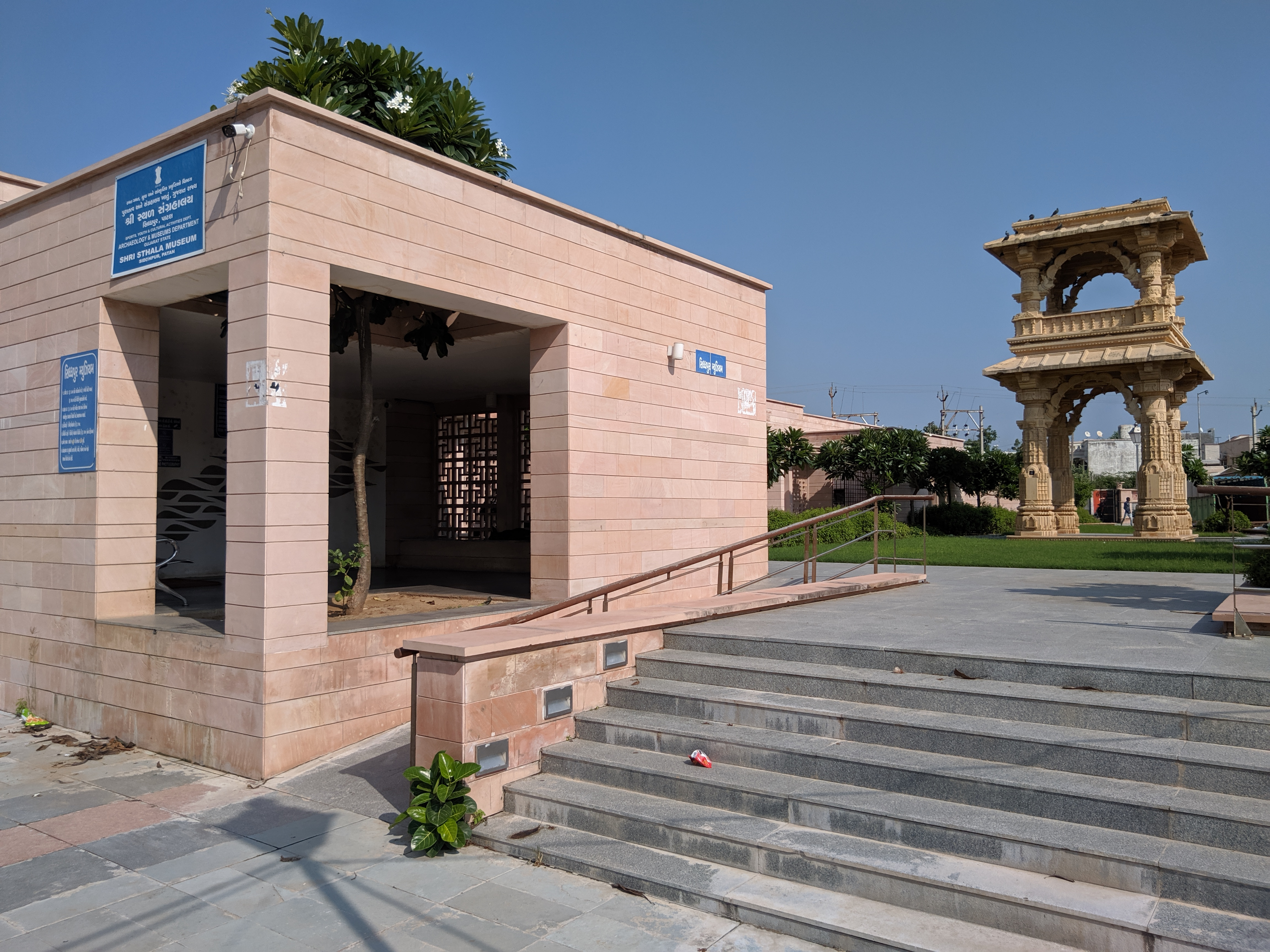
Shristhal Sangrahalay (Siddhpur Museum)
- Sidhpur has two protected national monument under Archaeological Survey of India (ASI) namely: Ruins of Rudra Mahalaya Temple and the Jami Masjid.
- Bindu Sarovar: It is a small artificial tank, even mentioned in Rig-veda and considered pious by Hindus. According to Hindu theology, there are five sacred lakes; collectively called Panch-Sarovar; Mansarovar, Bindu Sarovar, Narayan Sarovar, Pampa Sarovar and Pushkar Sarovar. They are also mentioned in Shrimad Bhagavata Purana. It is the only place where Matrushraddh, Shraddh ritual for mothers, is performed thus thousands of people visit it annually to perform the rituals for their dead mothers, in Kartika month of Hindu calendar.
- Bohra havelis (mansions) in European influenced architecture are largely belonging to Dawoodi Bohra trading community and spread over 18 mohallas or neighbourhoods in Najampura and Hassanpura. They are known for their wooden architecture and interior decoration.
- Arvadeswar Shiva temple is an ancient place of Natha Sampradaya.
- SAIYED MURAD SHAHID DATAR DADA RA DARGAH NEAR GANVADA VILLAGE AT SIDHPUR DISTRICT
- Mohamedally Tower, a clock tower, built by Bohra businessman Mohamedally Hararwala at the cost Rs. 15000, inaugurated on 4 April 1915, during the rule of Gaekwad.
- Shristhal Sangrahalay (Siddhpur Museum)

== Politics ==
Sidhpur is a constituency of the Gujarat Legislative Assembly within the Patan (Lok Sabha constituency).

== Transport ==
- Siddhpur railway station
- Sidhpur Bus Station

== See also ==
- Patan
