= Rudra Mahalaya Temple =

Former Hindu temple in Gujarat, India

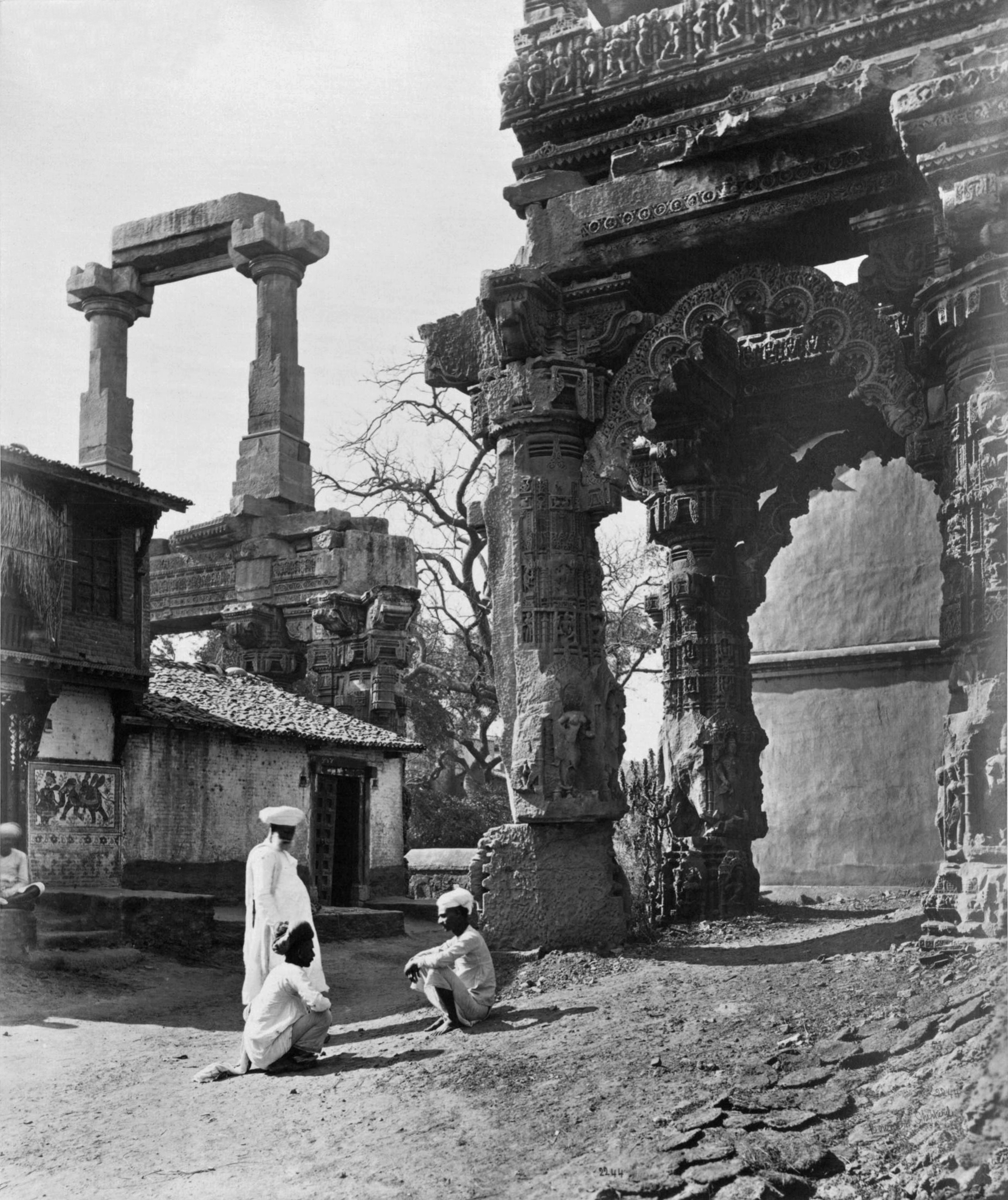
- Ruins of main portal, Toran, of Rudra Mahalaya, 1874

- Location within Gujarat
- Alternative names: Rudra Mala

General information
- Status: ruined
- Architectural style: Māru-Gurjara architecture
- Location: Siddhpur, Gujarat, India
- Coordinates: 23°55′09″N 72°22′45″E
- Construction started: 943 CE
- Opened: 1140 CE
- Destroyed: 1296 CE and 1414 CE

Technical details
- Material: sandstone
- Floor count: 2

Design and construction
- Designations: ASI Monument of National Importance (N-GJ-164 for temple/163 for mosque)
Rudra Mahalaya Temple
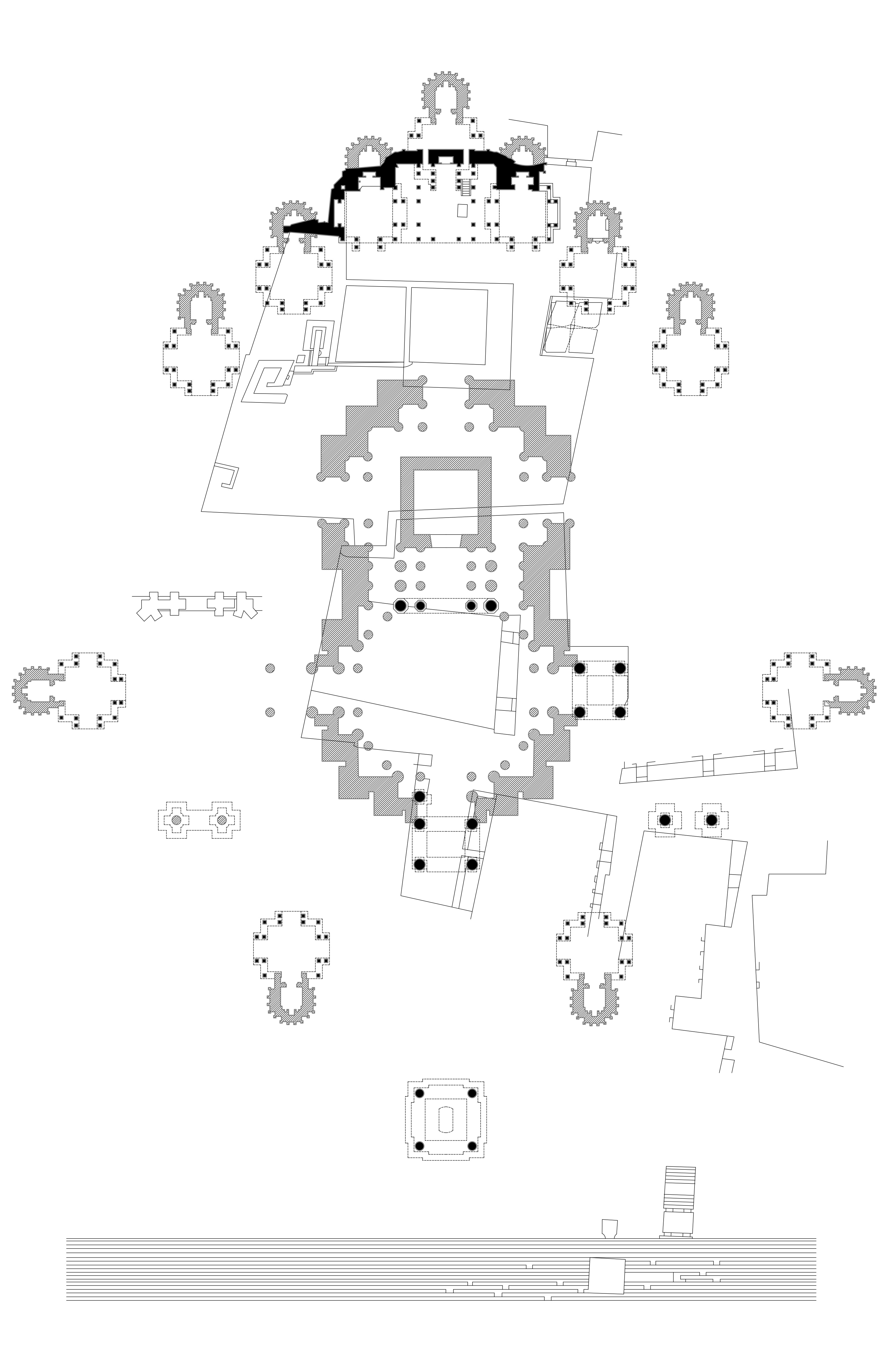
- Plan of Rudra Mahalaya temple
Religion
- Affiliation: Hinduism
- Deity: Rudra
Location
- Interactive map of Rudra Mahalaya Temple
Architecture
- Creator: Mularaja, Jayasimha Siddharaja and other Chaulukya kings

The Rudra Mahalaya Temple, also known as Rudramal, is a desecrated Hindu temple complex at Siddhpur town of Gujarat, India. Its construction was started in 943 CE by Mularaja and completed in 1140 CE by Jayasimha Siddharaja, a ruler of the Chaulukya dynasty. The Hindu temple was destroyed by the Sultan of Delhi, Alauddin Khalji, and later the Sultan of Gujarat, Ahmed Shah I (r. 1410–1444) desecrated and substantially demolished the temple, and also converted part of it into the congregational mosque (Jami Masjid) of the city. Two torans (porches) and four pillars of the former central structure still stand along with the western part of the complex used as a congregational mosque.

== History ==
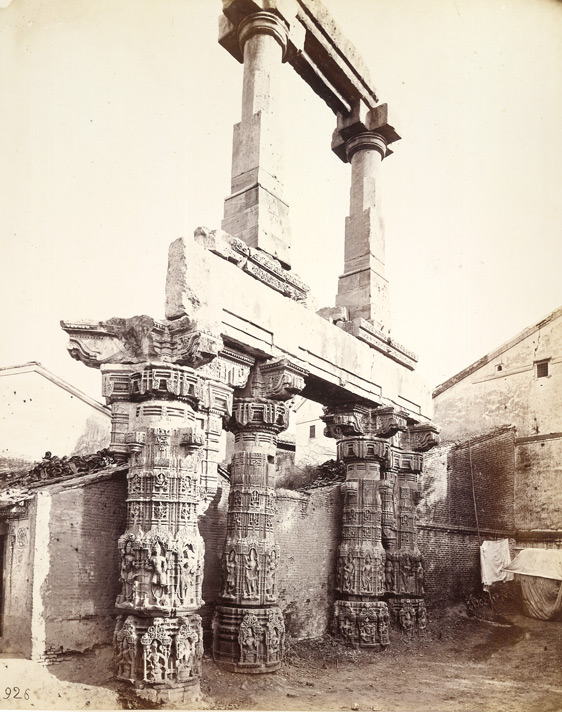
Four pillars and architrave of the ruined Rudra Mahalaya Temple

Sidhpur, under the rulers of Chaulukya dynasty, was a prominent town in the tenth century. An inscription from 986–987 CE mentions in passing that Mularaja, the founder of the Chaulukya dynasty of Gujarat, had offered prayers to Rudra Mahalay.Colonial sources say that Muladev ordered the construction of a shrine there to atone for his earlier sins, but it is possible that a temple existed at the place even before his reign. Archaeological evidence suggests that an existing structure was removed and a new complex was built on top of the existing foundation in twelfth century.

=== Consecration ===
It was during the 12th century, in 1140 CE, that Jayasimha Siddharaja (1094–1144) consecrated the temple complex in worship of Shiva. (Note: According to one legend, two Parmars from Malwa, named Govinddas and Madhavdas, took up their haunt among the rush grass that covered the neighbourhood of the Rudra Mahalaya, and lived by plunder. There they found the foundations of a temple and Shiva linga, and said that in the night they had seen heavenly beings. This was told to Siddharaj and led to the erection or completion of the temple.) (Note: In Mirat-i-Ahmadi, Ali Muhammad Khan writes, "The king on signifying his intention of building the temple, requested the astrologers, it is said, to appoint a fortunate hour; and they at this time predicted the destruction of the building." Then Siddha Raja caused images of "horse lords" and other great kings to be placed in the temple, and "near them a representation of himself in the attitude of supplication, with an inscription praying that, even if the land was laid waste, this temple might not be destroyed.") This act continued the long-running patronage of the city by the Chalukyas.

=== Dismantling ===
The temple was destroyed during the siege of the city by Ahmad Shah I (1410–44) of Muzaffarid dynasty; parts of it were reused in setting up a new congregational mosque. Mirat-i-Sikandiri the earliest extant chronicle in Persian documenting Shah's campaigns, attributes the destruction to religious zealotry (Note: The parts were quoted from Tarikh-e Ahmad Shahi, a Persian historical poem by Hulvi Shiraz. Shiraz's text does not survive.)

== Architecture ==
The temple was built in Māru-Gurjara architecture style.

== Gallery ==
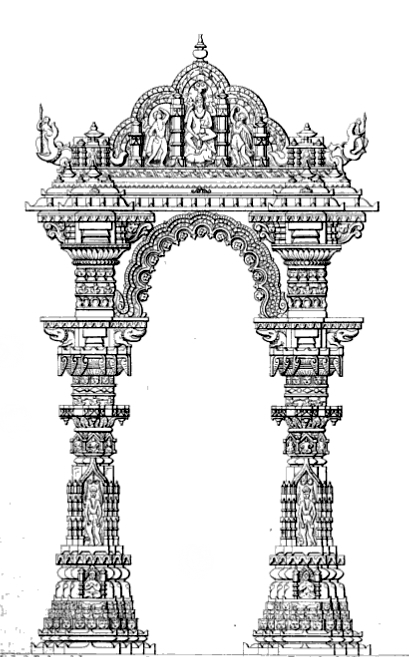
Elevation of Kirti Torana

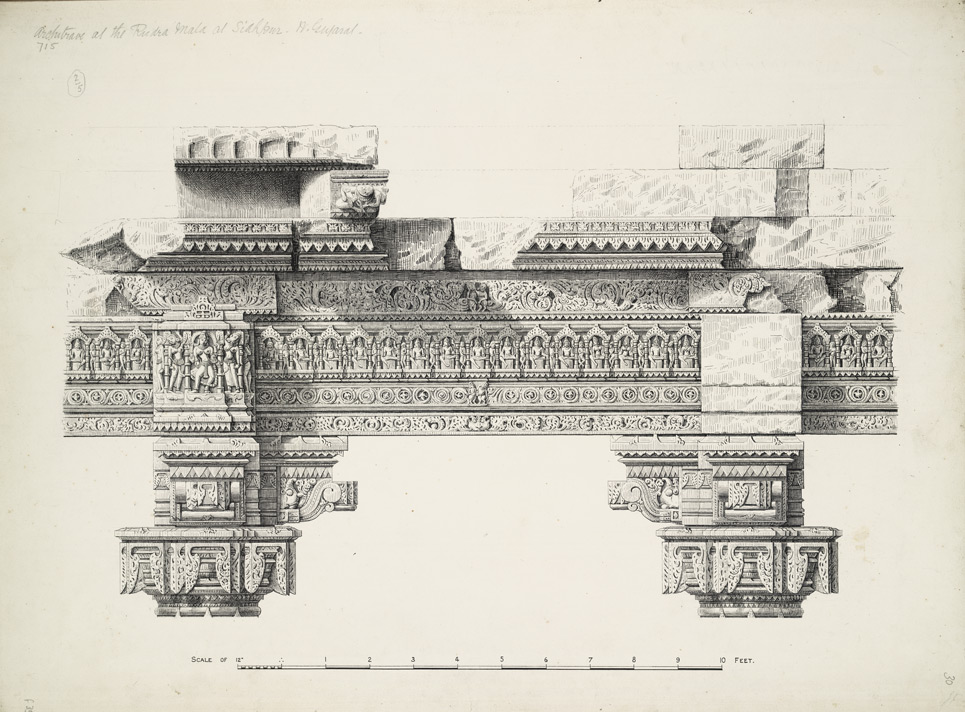
Carving of the lintel

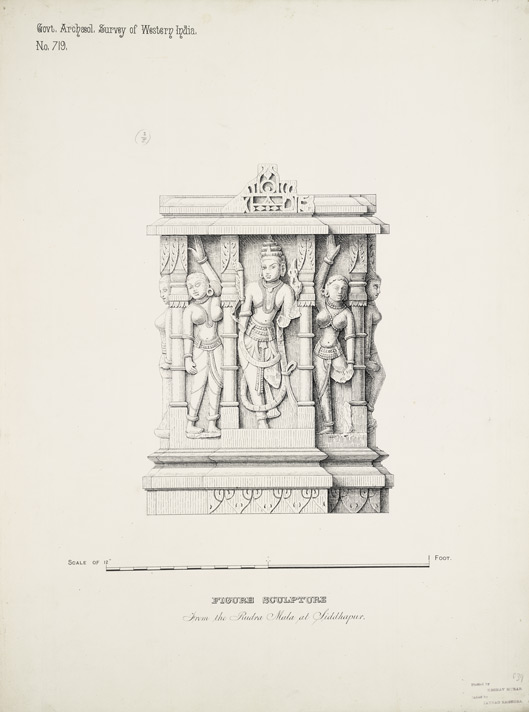
Drawing of sculptures

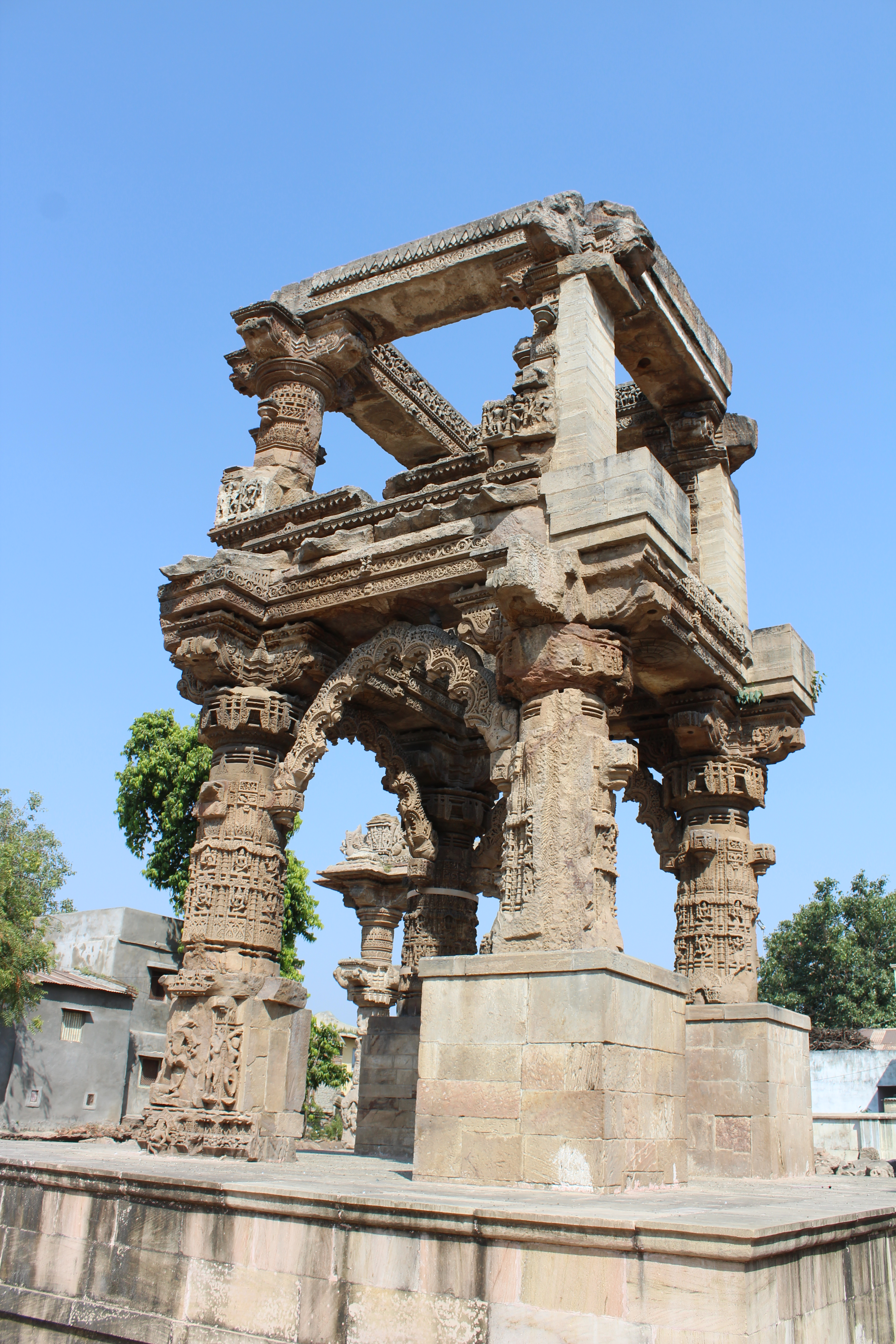
One of the surviving porches

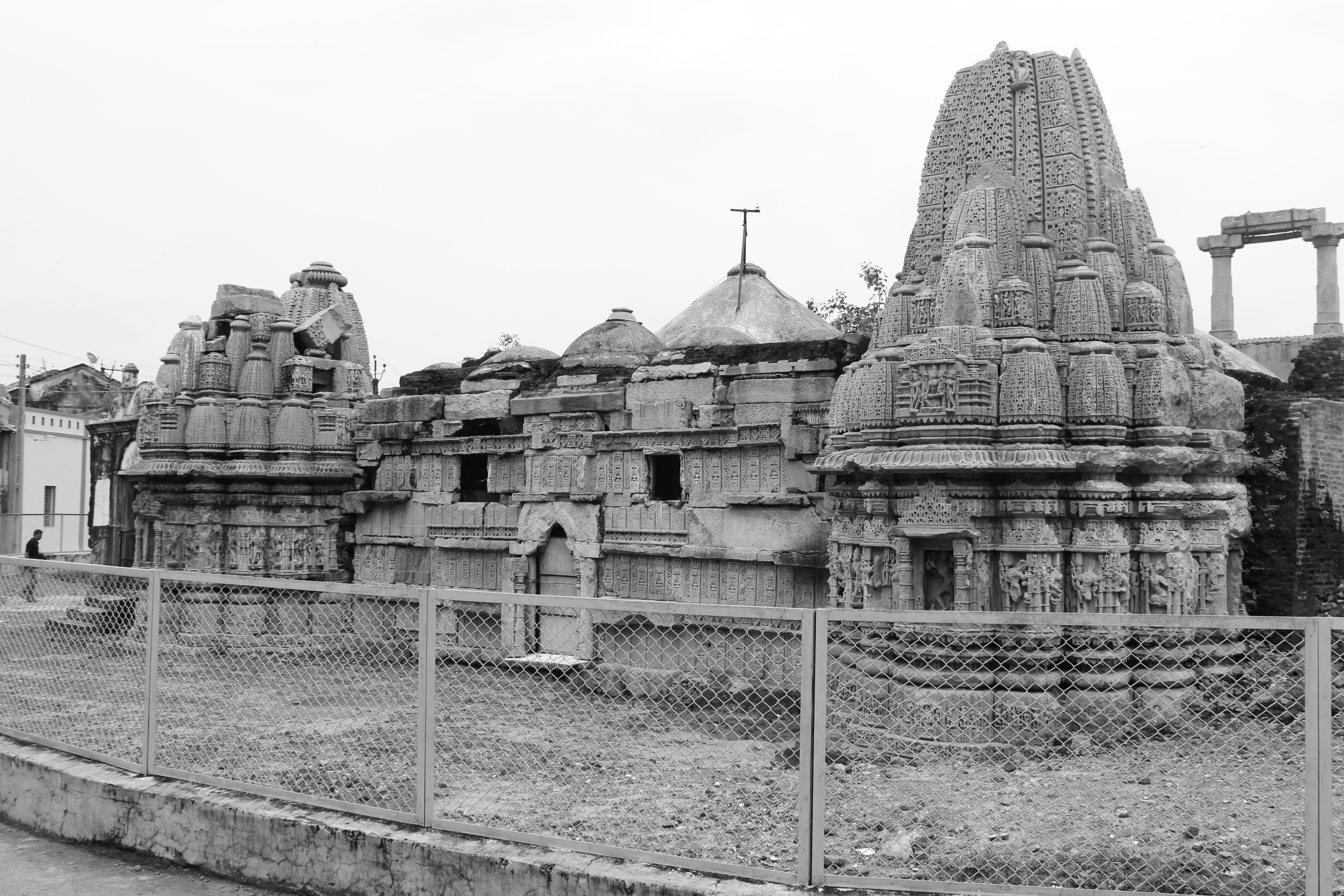
Rudramahal

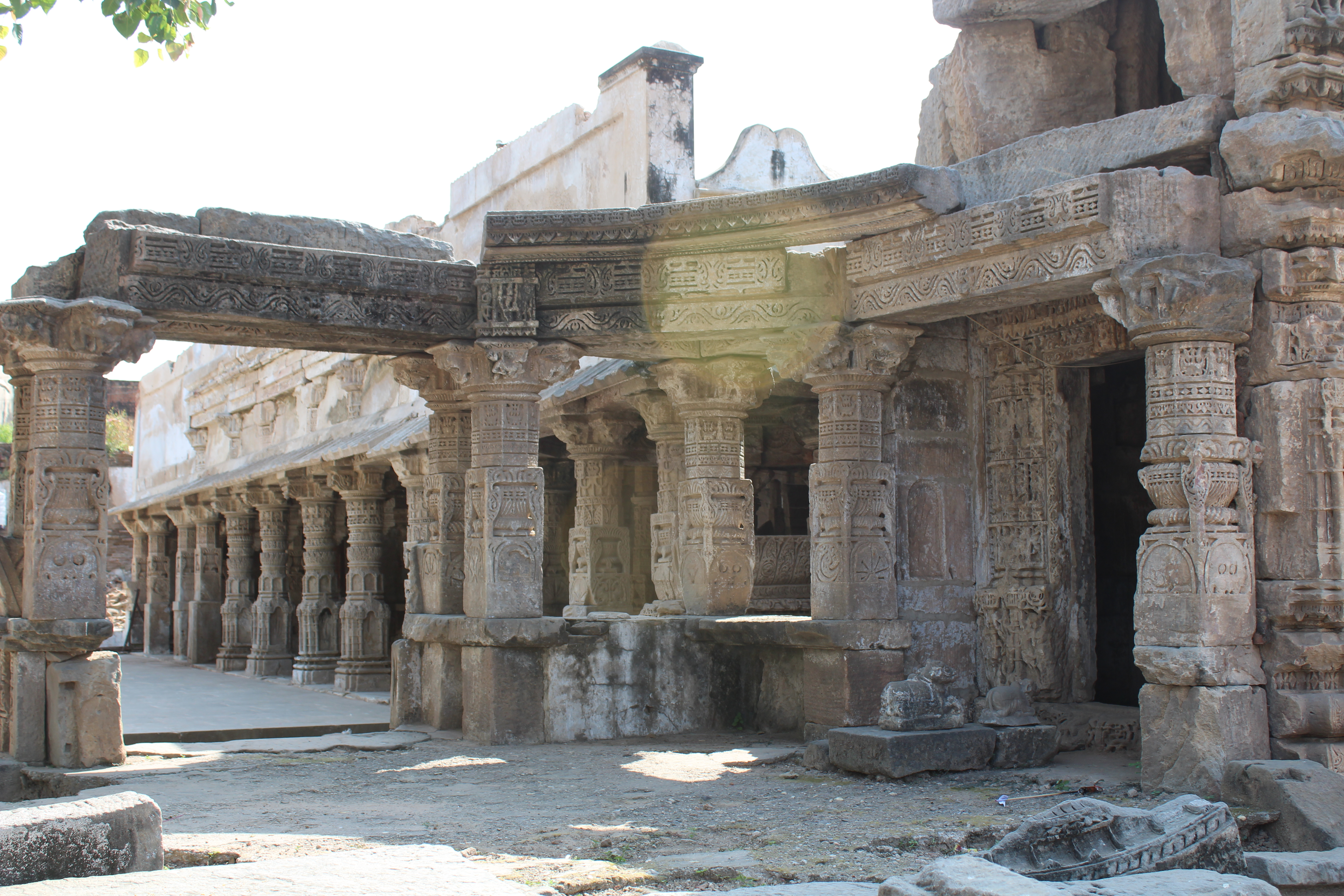
Surviving western part

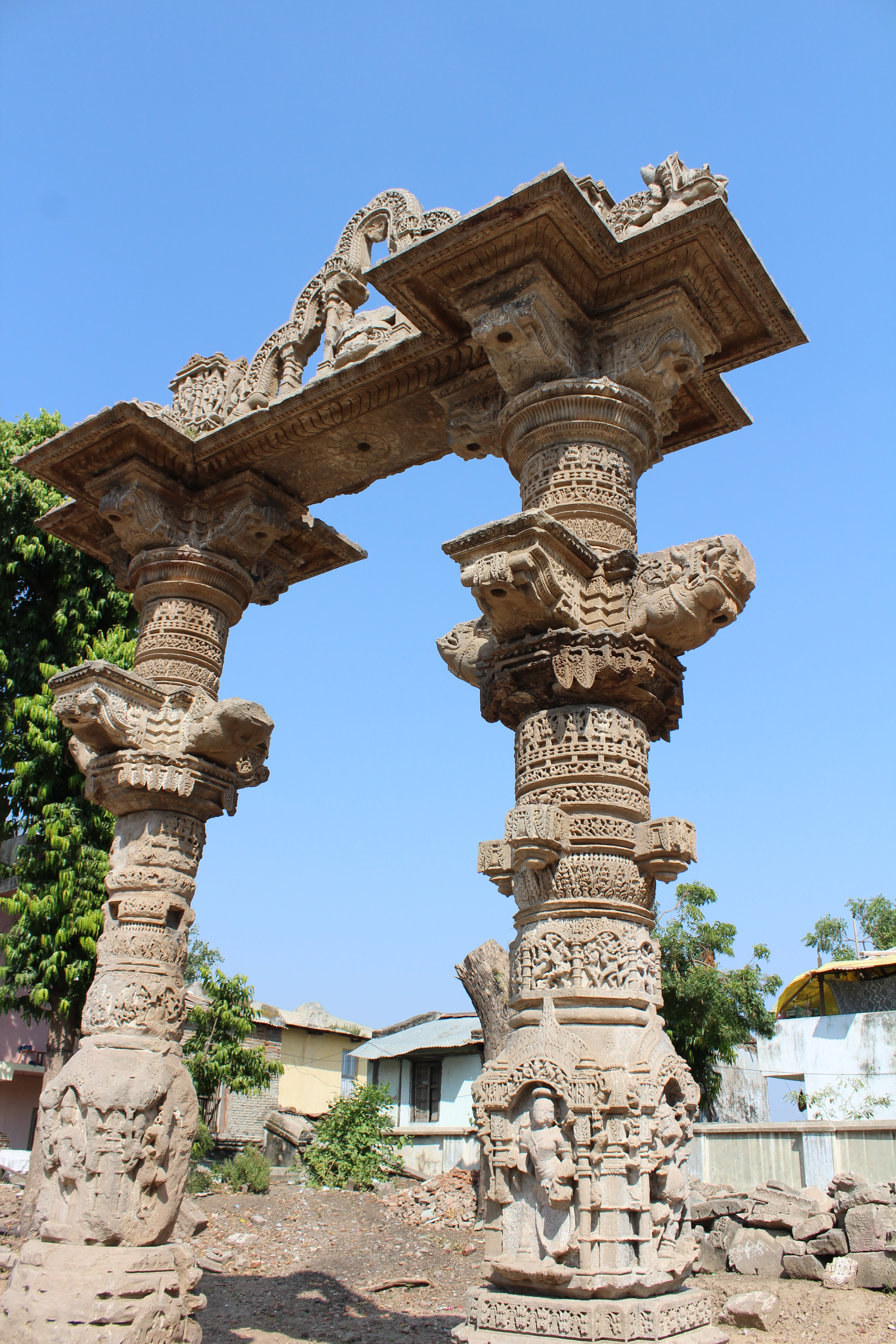
Surviving torana

== See also ==
- List of Monuments of National Importance in Gujarat
