= Jagadeva =

11th-12th century prince of central India

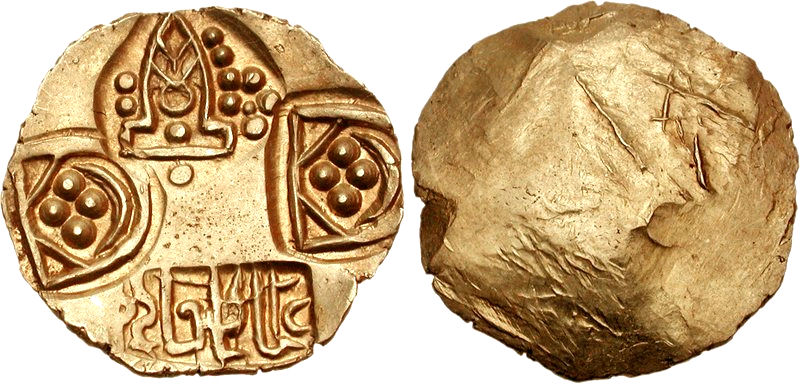
- A gold coin of Jagadeva
- Spouse: Virmati (as mentioned in Ras-Mala)
- Dynasty: Paramara
- Father: Udayaditya
- Religion: Hinduism

Jagadeva, also known as Jagaddeva or Jagdev Parmar, was an 11th-12th century prince from the Paramara dynasty of central India. He is known from an inscription discovered at Jainad and some folk legends. His political status is uncertain, although according to one theory, he may have been a vassal of the Western Chalukyas.

== Ancestry and political status ==
The coins and inscriptions from Jagadeva's period have been found in the northern parts of Berar and Marathwada regions of Maharashtra, not the traditional Paramara territory of Malwa. These regions were dominated by the Chalukyas of Kalyani. An inscription discovered at Jainad names Jagaddeva as the son of the Paramara king Udayaditya (reigned c. 1060–1086). Four gold coins bearing the name "Shri-Jagadeva" have also been discovered. Several scholars, including P. C. Roy, identify the issuer of these coins as the Paramara prince. M. H. Krishna surmised that the Chalukya king Someshvara was known by the title "Jagaddeva" ("Lord of the world") in the northern part of his kingdom, and it was he who issued these coins. However, all the known Chalukya coins feature Kannada script, while coins of Jagaddeva feature the Nagari script used by the Paramaras. Therefore, Krishna's theory is purely conjectural.

V. P. Rode theorizes that Jagadeva accepted the suzerainty of Vikramaditya VI of Kalyani. Vikramaditya made him governor of Berar and a part of Deccan. P. C. Roy disagrees with this theory, arguing that a vassal could not have issued gold coins in his own name, and the coins do not mention the Chalukyas.

A legendary account in the Ras-Mala states that Jagadeva succeeded Udayaditya as the king. Therefore, D. C. Ganguly suggested that Jagadeva was another name for Lakshmadeva (r. c. 1086-1094 CE), who according to Paramara inscriptions, was the successor of Udayaditya. According to Ganguly's theory, he abdicated the throne in favour of his brother Naravarman (r. c. 1094-1133 CE). He then governed the southern part of the Paramara kingdom (northern parts of Berar and Deccan) until at least 1112 CE. Later, he lived at the Chalukya court at Vikramaditya's invitation. K. C. Jain disagrees with this theory, arguing that Jagaddeva and Lakshmadeva were two distinct princes.

== Jainad inscription ==
Location of Jainad in modern India

The undated Jainad inscription was found on the floor of a temple mandapa. It was composed by the poet Ashvatthama in Sanskrit language, and has been dated to the 11th century on a palaeographical basis. It records the construction of a temple dedicated to Surya (the sun deity) by one Padmavati. The inscription states that it was issued during Jagaddeva's rule.

The inscription begins with verses praising Surya and Shiva. It then mentions the Agnivansha myth, which states that the founder of the Paramara dynasty was created by Vashistha from a sacrificial fire pit. Jagaddeva was born in this dynasty: his father and paternal uncle are named as Udayaditya and Bhoja respectively.

Next, the record describes the military achievements of Jagaddeva (see below).

The rest of the inscription describes Padmavati, who resembled Lakshmi and constructed the "Nimbaditya" temple "in this city". The inscription does not name the city, but it is possible that it refers to Jainad, where the inscription was found in a temple. Padmavati is described as the queen of Arjuna, who was a member of the Dahima family. Arjuna is described as a subordinate and a favourite of the king Udayaditya. The inscription also mentions Udayaditya's minister Lolarka as another member of the Dahima family. He is described a Shaivite who was loyal to Jagaddeva. Lolarka's father Gunaraja was also a favourite of Udayaditya.

== Military career ==
The Jainad inscriptions states that Jagadeva:

- Defeated the king of Andhra. Historian H. V. Trivedi believes that this refers to the Chola king Rajaraja II, and Jagaddeva may have led a Chalukya invasion against the Chola occupation of Andhra territory.
- "Uprooted in sport" the king of Chakradurga. Chakradurga can be identified with the present-day Bastar district; its ruler at that time was Someshvara of an obscure dynasty named Naga.
- Successfully invaded Dorasamudra, causing "acute pain in the heart of the chief of Malahara". Trivedi theorizes that this refers to the Chalukya invasion of the Hoysala kingdom, which was ruled by Ballala. According to him, "Malahara" is a variation of "Malaha" or "Malapa" (hill chiefs), and referred to a hill tribe to which the Hoysalas belonged.
- Fought against the Gurjaras, causing a flood of tears among the wives of the Gurjara warriors. The inscription mentions the word "Jayasimha" in this sentence. D. C. Ganguly interpreted the sentence to mean that Jagaddeva's bravery was an "announcement of the valour of Jayasimha". He concluded that Jagaddeva may have fought against the Chaulukya (Solanki) king of Gujarat, as part of the Paramara army under Jayasimha I. However, a later translation appearing in Epigraphia Indica interprets the verse to mean that Jayasimha was an enemy of Jagaddeva. On basis of this, Trivedi identifies Jayasimha as the Chaulukya king Jayasimha Siddharaja.
- Subdued the king Karna. Ganguly identified Karna as the Chaulukya king Karna, but V. V. Mirashi disagreed with this theory, pointing out that Jagadeva's father Udayaditya is said to have destroyed the king of Dahala. The Dahala region was ruled by the Kalachuris, so Mirashi identifies Karna as the Kalachuri king Karna. According to H. V. Trivedi, the Kalachuri king may be identified as either Karna or his son Yashah-Karna. Jaggadeva's brother Lakshmadeva is known to have invaded the Kalachuri capital Tripuri during Yashah-Karna's reign, and might have been aided by Jagaddeva in this campaign.

The 19 January 1163 CE Anumakomda inscription of the Kakatiya ruler Rudra-deva states that his father Prola II quickly repulsed Jagadeva's invasion of Anumakomda. As a Chalukya subordinate, Jagadeva governed the Sabbi-1000 province, which comprised the Sabbi-nadu region with 1000 villages, centered around Vemulavada. He probably rebelled against the Chalukya king when the king transferred the control of this province to Prola II's father Beta II. He then attacked the Kakatiya capital Anumakonda, but Prola II repulsed him.

== Legends ==
=== Legend of Virmati and Jagadeva ===
One legend about Jagadeva is mentioned in the Ras-Mala, a collection of Gujarati legends. It names Jagdev Parmar (Jagadeva) as the son of king Udayadit of Dhar (Udayaditya) and his Solanki (Chaulukya) wife. The king's favourite son and the heir apparent was Rindhaval, his son by another wife from Vagheli family. The Chavda ruler of Tuktoda was impressed with Jagdev's merits, and married his daughter Virmati to the Paramara prince. Jagdev left his father's kingdom because of harassment from the Vagheli queen and reached Tuktoda. From there, he and Virmati marched to Anhilvara (Patan), the capital of the Solanki king Sidh Raj Jesangh (Jayasimha Siddharaja).

Virmati's mother was the sister of the Solanki king, and Jagdev hoped to find employment with him. Virmati went to the royal palace to seek the king's help, but she was trapped in a room by a woman named Jamoti, who had been paid by the governor's son Dungarsi to find a paramour for him. When Dungarsi came to the room, Virmati got him drunk and killed him. When the king learned about this incident, he praised Virmati as an honourable woman and enlisted Jagdev in his service.

One day, the Solanki king asked Jagdev to investigate some strange sounds he had been hearing. Jagdev found four wailing women, who introduced themselves as the Fates of Patan. They told him that the Solanki king was about to die. Near them were four other women, who were laughing. They introduced themselves as the Fates of Delhi. Jagdev asked them if there was any way to save the king's life. They told him that if a highly ranked man offered his life instead, the king would survive. Jagdev then decided to offer his life, but his wife insisted that their entire family offer their lives. First, they offered their first-born son to the Fates. The Fates beheaded the boy, but impressed with the family's loyalty to the king, they let the rest of the family go. The Solanki king had secretly seen the entire episode. He was pleased with Jagdev's loyalty, and married one of his daughters to Jagdev. Virmati was satisfied with this arrangement, because multiple wives indicated the high status of a Rajput lord. According to this legend, Jagdev went back to Dhar after Udayadit's death and became the new Paramara king.

Navalram's play Veermati (1869) is based on this legend. Shree Nath Patankar made Sati Veermata, an Indian silent film based on the legend, in 1923.

=== Other legends ===
According to another bardic tradition, some tribes in the northern part of the Indian subcontinent are descended from "Jagdev Parmar", that is, Jagadeva. During the reign of Jagadeva's nephew Yashovarman (r. c. 1133-1142 CE), the Delhi Sultanate invaded Malwa. The bardic works state that Jagadeva's descendant Rai Shankar and some other Paramaras migrated to Punjab via Rajputana as a result of this invasion. Rai Shankar had three sons: Gheo (the ancestor of Ghebas), Teo or Tenu (the ancestor of Tiwanas) and Seo (the ancestor of Sials). Teo's descendants established the Mataur village in present-day Haryana, from where the Tiwanas migrated to other places. Some of them converted from Hinduism to Sikhism and Islam in the later centuries.

The rulers of the Muli princely state in present-day Gujarat also claimed descent from Jagdev Parmar.

The Ambaraian rulers of the Akhnoor principality in present-day Jammu and Kashmir traced their ancestry to "Jagdev Singh" (Jagadeva), who had migrated from Dhar.
