= List of kings of Malwa =

Raja/Maharaja/Sultan of Malwa
- Imperial
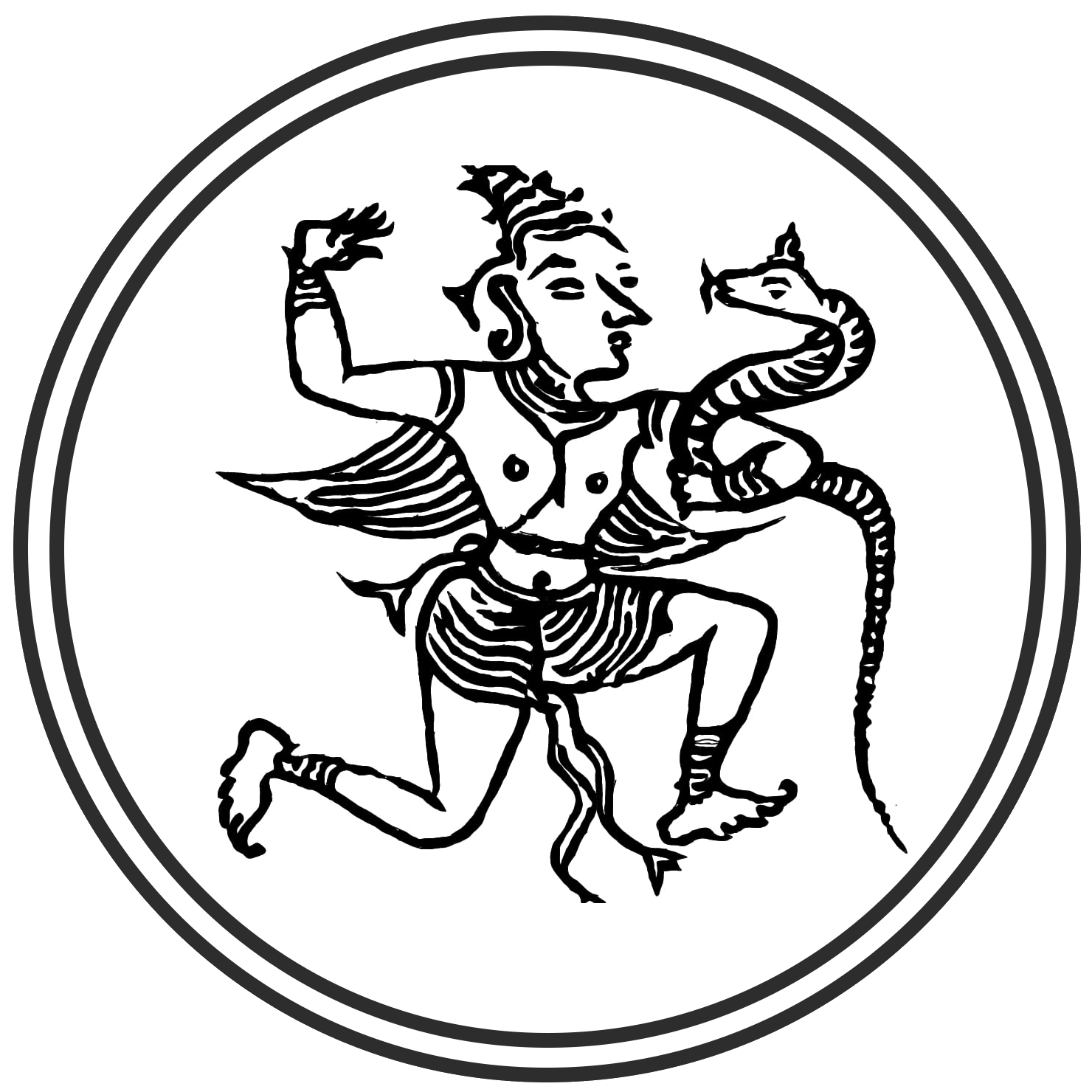
- Coat of Arms under the Paramaras

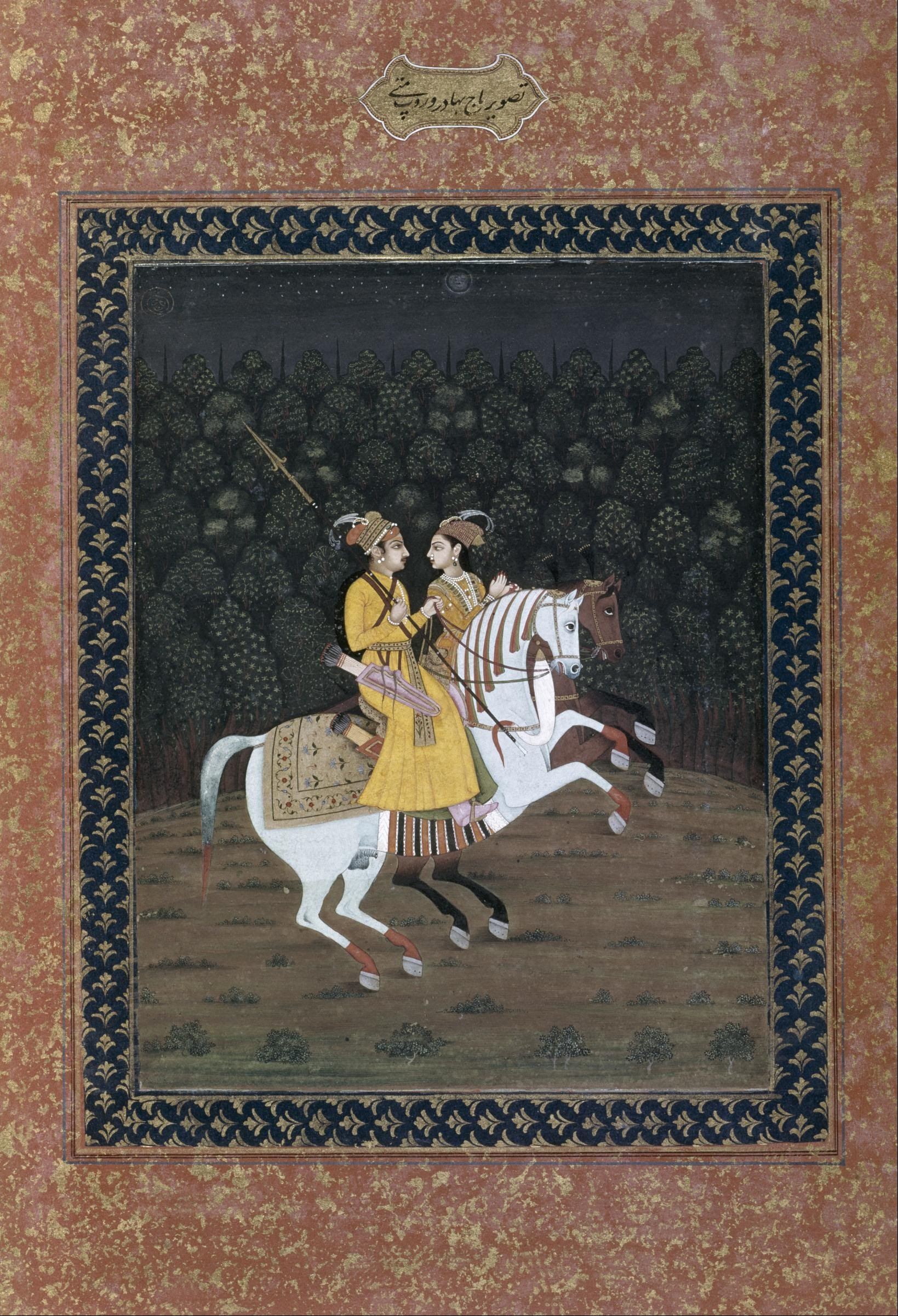
- Last to reign Baz Bahadur; 1555–1562

Details
- First monarch: Jayavarman
- Last monarch: Baz Bahadur
- Formed: 350
- Abolished: 1562
- Appointer: Hereditary

The Kingdom of Malwa was ruled by kings discontinuously from 350 to 1462.

== Later Gupta dynasty (575–606) ==
- Mahasenagupta (575–601)
- Devagupta (601–606)

== Paramara dynasty (948–1305) ==
According to historian Kailash Chand Jain, "Knowledge of the early Paramara rulers from Upendra to Vairisimha is scanty; there are no records, and they are known only from later sources." An inscription from Udaipur indicates that the Paramara dynasty survived until 1310, at least in the north-eastern part of Malwa. A later inscription shows that the area had been captured by the Delhi Sultanate by 1338.

The Paramara rulers mentioned in the various inscriptions and literary sources include:

List of Paramara dynasty rulers
Serial No.	Ruler	Reign (CE)
1	Paramara (legendary)	legendary
2	Upendra (Krishnaraja)	early 9th century
3	Vairisimha I	early 9th century
4	Siyaka I	mid-9th century
5	Vakpatiraja I	late 9th – early 10th century
6	Vairisimha II	mid-10th century
7	Siyaka II	940–972
8	Vakpatiraja II (alias Munja)	972–990
9	Sindhuraja	990–1010
10	Bhoja	1010–1055
11	Jayasimha I	1055–1070
12	Udayaditya	1070–1086
13	Lakshmadeva	1086–1094
14	Naravarman	1094–1133
15	Yashovarman	1133–1142
16	Jayavarman I	1142–1143
17	Interregnum (1143–1175) under the usurper Ballala and later the Solanki king Kumarapala	1143–1175
18	Vindhyavarman	1175–1194
19	Subhatavarman	1194–1209
20	Arjunavarman I	1210–1215
21	Devapala	1215/1218–1239
22	Jaitugideva	1239–1255
23	Jayavarman II	1255–1274
24	Arjunavarman II	1274–1285
25	Bhoja II	1285–1301
26	Mahalakadeva	1301–1305

== Sultan of the Malwa Sultanate ==
Royal Title	Personal name	Reign
Dilawar Khan was appointed as the governor of Malwa province in 1392 by the Sultan of the Delhi Sultanate. He declared himself independent in 1401 by establishing Malwa Sultanate. He was the first Sultan of Malwa from Ghurid dynasty.
Sultan سلطان	Amid Shah Daud Dilawar Shah عمید شاه داؤد دلاور شاه	1401–1406
Sultan سلطان	Husam-ud-Din Hoshang Shah حسام الدین ہوشنگ شاہ	1406–1407
The interregnum; as the Sultan of Gujarat Muzaffar Shah I defeated Hoshang Shah and himself reigned as the Sultan of Malwa.
Sultan سلطان	Shams-ud-Din Muzaffar Shah شمس‌الدین مظفر شاه	1407–1408
Ghurid dynasty restored; Musa Khan, a nephew of Dilawar Khan, enthroned
Sultan سلطان	Musa Shah موسی شاه	1408–1409
Sultan سلطان	Husam-ud-Din Hoshang Shah حسام الدین ہوشنگ شاہ	1409–1435
Sultan سلطان	Taj-ud-Din Muhammad Shah تاج الدین محمد شاہ	1435–1436
Ghurid dynasty replaced by Khilji dynasty, the founder of which, Mahmud Khalji, was a grandnephew of Dilawar Khan.
Sultan سلطان	Ala-ud-Din Mahmud Shah I علاؤالدین محمود شاہ اول	1436–1469
Sultan سلطان	Ghiyas-ud-Din Shah غیاث الدین شاہ	1469–1500
Sultan سلطان	Nasir-ud-Din Shah ناصر الدین شاہ	1500–1510
Civil war between Mahmud Khalji II and Sahib Khan titled Sultan Muhammad
Sultan سلطان	Mahmud Shah II شہاب الدین محمود شاہ دوئم	1511–1531
Sultan سلطان	Sultan Muhammad سلطان محمد	13 August 1511–January 1512
The Rajput ruler of Mewar Maharana Sanga defeated and imprisoned Mahmud Shah II and conquered most of Malwa.
Raja	Medini Rai (ruled large part of Malwa as a vassal of Rana Sanga)	1519–1527
The interregnum; as the Sultan of Gujarat Bahadur Shah defeated Mahmud Shah II and himself reigned as the Sultan of Malwa.
Sultan سلطان	Bahadur Shah بہادر شاہ	1531 – 1536
Mughal Emperor Humayun defeated Sultan Bahadur Shah and briefly occupied Malwa for a year in between 1535 – 1536.
Amir امیر	Hindal Mirza هندل میرزا	1535 – 1536
Sultan سلطان	Bahadur Shah بہادر شاہ	1536 – 1537
Malwa passed down to Muhammad Shah I, the eldest nephew of Bahadur Shah and Sultan of Khandesh Sultanate for a few months but he died before his coronation.
Sultan سلطان	Miran Muhammad Shah I میران محمد شاہ اول	1537
Independence declared under a Khilji noble, Mallu Khan as Qadir Shah.
Sultan سلطان	Qadir Shah قادر شاہ	1537 – 1542
1542 – 1555; era of semi-independent governors of Sur Empire.
Wali ولی	Shuja'at Khan شجاعت خان	1542
Wali ولی	Isa Khan عیسیٰ خان	1542 – 1545
Wali ولی	Shuja'at Khan شجاعت خان	1545 – 1552
Independence declared under the son of Shujaat Khan, Baz Bahadur.
Sultan سلطان	Baz Bahadur باز بہادر	1555 – 1562
Malwa Sultanate was abolished in 1562 after Baz Bahadur's defeat against Mughal army.

== Family tree ==
=== Ghurid Dynasty ===
Ghurid Dynasty

Dilawar Khan ?-1406; Governor of Malwa; R.1391–1401; Sultan of Malwa; R.1401–1406
Hoshang Shah; Sultan of Malwa; R.1406–1435
Muhammad Shah; Sultan of Malwa; R.1435–1436

=== Khalji Dynasty ===
Khalji Dynasty

Mahmud Shah I Sultan of Malwa; R.1436–1469
Ghiyath Shah; Sultan of Malwa; R.1469–1500
Nasir Shah; Sultan of Malwa; R.1500–1510
Mahmud Shah II; Sultan of Malwa; R.1510–1531

== See also ==
- Malwa
- Ujjain
- Vikramaditya
- Malavas
- Malwa culture
- History of India
- List of Indian monarchs
- List of dynasties and rulers Rajasthan
- History of Madhya Pradesh
