= Karna I =

King of Gujarat from 1064 to 1092

- Trailokyamalla

King of Gujarat
- Reign: c. 1064–1092 CE
- Predecessor: Bhima I
- Successor: Jayasimha Siddharaja
- Spouse: Mayanalladevi
- Issue: Jayasimha Siddharaja
- Dynasty: Chaulukya (Solanki)
- Father: Bhima I
- Mother: Udayamati

Find spots of inscriptions issued during the reign of Karna I

Karna (r. c. 1064–1092 CE) was a Chaulukya king who ruled the present-day Gujarat and surrounding areas, from his capital Anahilapataka (modern Patan) in India.

Karna succeeded his father Bhima I, who had invaded the Paramara kingdom of Malwa at the time of Bhoja's death. Karna was forced to retreat from Malwa by Bhoja's brother Udayaditya. He annexed Lata to the Chaulukya territory by defeating a Kalachuri general, but lost it within a few years. He also suffered a defeat against the Chahamanas of Naddula, who raided the Chaulukya capital during his reign.

Karna is credited with defeating a Bhil chief of Ashapalli, and laying the foundation of the Karnavati city, identified with the modern Ahmedabad in western India. Karna married Mayanalladevi, (Note: According to M. A. Dhaky, the correct spelling of her name is Mailaldevi as in Kannada language.) who was the mother of his son and successor Jayasimha Siddharaja.

== Early life ==
Karna was born to the Chaulukya monarch Bhima I and Queen Udayamati. According to the 12th-century Jain chronicler Hemachandra, Bhima had three sons: Mularaja, Kshemaraja, and Karna. Mularaja died during Bhima's lifetime. Kshemaraja, the elder surviving son, renounced his rights to the throne, and retired to Dadhisthali as an ascetic. Bhima then placed Karna on the throne and retired. After becoming the king, Karna sent Kshemaraja's son Devaprasada to Dadisthali to take care of his father.

The veracity of Hemachandra is doubtful, and is not corroborated by any historical evidence. The 14th century chronicler Merutunga states that Bhima's three sons were Mularaja, Karna and Haripala. Of these, Haripala was born of a concubine named Bakuladevi. According to historian A. K. Majumdar, Merutunga's account appears to be more satisfactory, since voluntary rejections of thrones were very rare. Karna may have banished his half-brother and nephew to eliminate any rival claimants to the throne. Hemachandra was a royal courtier of Karna's son Jayasimha Siddharaja as well Kumarapala (a descendant of Kshemaraja/Haripala). Therefore, he probably invented a fictional narrative to avoid mentioning Bhima's illegitimate son as an ancestor of his patron. This theory is corroborated by the fact that Jayasimha Siddharaja hated Kumarapala.

Karna bore the title Trailokyamalla.

== Military career ==
=== Paramaras of Malwa ===
Karna was a contemporary of his Kalachuri namesake Karna (also known as Lakshmi-Karna). Karna's father Bhima I had formed an alliance with the Lakshmi-Karna to defeat the Paramaras of Malwa. The Paramara king Bhoja died as the alliance attacked Malwa, and a war of succession broke out between the Paramara relatives Jayasimha I and Udayaditya. Lakshmi-Karna seems to have occupied Malwa for sometime, but he soon suffered a series defeats against other neighbouring kings, and Bhima broke away from him.

Udayaditya ultimately ascended the Paramara throne in Malwa. The Chaulukya inscriptions and chronicles claim that Karna defeated the new Paramara king. An inscription from Kumarapala's reign states that Karna defeated the Malwa monarch at the Sudakupa pass. The Gujarat chronicler Arisimha claims that Karna brought a statue of Nilakantha to Gujarat as a result of his victory against the Malwa ruler. Another Gujarat poet Someshvara claims that Karna overran Malwa, and the Paramara priest magically invoked an evil spirit to defeat him. However, Karna's priest Ama (who was an ancestor of Someshvara), turned this evil spirit against the Paramara priest, who was killed as a result.

The non-Chaulukya records, on the other hand, suggest that Udayaditya defeated Karna. According to the Paramara inscriptions, Udayaditya defeated three kings to ascend the Paramara throne. One of these three kings was Karna, who is identified with the Chaulukya king. Chahamana chronicle Prithviraja Vijaya states that the Chahamana king Vigraharaja III gave a horse named Saranga to Udayaditya, with whose help Udayaditya defeated Karna.The Jainad inscription of Udayaditya's son Jagaddeva also mentions that he subdued Karna, and made the wives of the Gurjara warriors cry. These evidences indicate that the Paramara claims of victory over Karna pertain to the Chaulukya Karna (and not the Kalachuri Karna).

These opposing claims indicate that Karna defeated Udayaditya at first, but then Udayaditya was able to defeat him and ascend the throne of Malwa with Chahamana support. Udayaditya's son Jagaddeva seems to have accompanied his father in the battle against Karna.

=== Kalachuris of Tripuri ===
After the death of the Paramara king Bhoja, the Kalachuris of Tripuri briefly occupied Malwa. The Kalachuri general Vapullaka also conquered the Lata region (present-day south Gujarat), which was located between the Chaulukya and the Paramara kingdoms. By 1074 CE, Lata was under Chaulukya control, as attested by one of Karna's Navsari inscription. Thus, it appears that Karna expelled the Kalachuris from Lata, and annexed the region to the Chaulukya kingdom.

Karna's victory appears to have been achieved during the reign of the Kalachuri king Yashah-Karna, as suggested by a verse of the Gujarat poet Someshvara. This verse talks about how the rivalry between the legendary heroes Karna and Arjuna resulted in Arjuna's yashah (fame) being driven away. It appears that Karna lost Lata to one Trivikramapala within three years, but the region was recaptured by his son Jayasimha Siddharaja.

=== Other campaigns ===
The Chahamanas of Naddula invaded the Chaulukya kingdom during Karna's reign. According to their Sundha Hill inscription, the Chahamana ruler Prithvipala defeated Karna, and his successor Jojalladeva occupied the Chaulukya capital Anahilapataka by force. It is possible that the Naddula Chahamanas raided the Chaulukya capital while Karna was busy at another place.

According to a Ras-Mala account based on the writings of the 14th century chronicler Merutunga, Karna defeated the Bhils and the Kolis. The two tribes lived between the Rann of Kutch and the Sabarmati River, and plundered the Chaulukya territories. As a result, Karna led a series of expeditions against them. In one such campaign, he defeated a Bhil chief named Asha (Āśā), who lived at Ashapalli. According to Merutunga, Karna established the city of Karnavati after this victory. Karnavati is identified with modern Ahmedabad by some, but this is not certain.

Bilhana's poem Karna-Sundari, which presents Karna as a hero, claims that he conquered Sindh. But this claim is historically inaccurate.

Two relatively late texts suggest that Karna was defeated by the Chahamana king Durlabharaja III. The 14th-century text Prabandha Kosha claims that Durlabha defeated the Gurjara king, brought him to the Chahamana capital Ajmer in chains and forced him to sell yogurt in a market. The 15th century Hammira Mahakavya claims that Karna was killed in a battle against Durlabha. However, this claim is historically inaccurate: Durlabha died around 1070 CE, while Karna lived until 1092 CE. Moreover, the earlier Chahamana records (such as Prithviraja Vijaya) do not mention any such conflict. It is possible that Durlabha achieved a minor military success against Karna, which was magnified into a major victory by the later panegyrists.

== Personal life ==
Karna married Mayanalla, a daughter of the Kadamba king Jayakeshi I (r. c. 1050–1080). The various legends provide contradictory accounts of how this marriage happened. According to Hemachandra's 12th century Dvyashraya, Mayanalla was an extremely beautiful Kadamba princess. She once saw Karna's painting by a Buddhist artist. Enamoured by Karna's looks, she rejected all other suitors, and resolved to marry him. With the approval of her father Jayakeshi, she sent an artist to Karna's court with her own portrait. The Kadamba king also sent gifts for Karna, including an elephant. When Karna went out in the garden to check out the gifted elephant, he found the princess waiting for him. He verified her identity by asking certain questions, and then married her.

According to Merutunga's 14th century Prabandha-Chintamani, Mayanalla-devi was an ugly princess of Karnata. One day, she remembered her past life. In that past life, she was a devout Shaivite, who had planned to visit the Somanath temple in Gujarat. However, she was stopped at Bahuloda for being unable to pay a pilgrim tax imposed by the rulers of Gujarat. When Mayanalla recalled this incident from her past life, she decided to marry the king of Gujarat and waive this unfair tax. At her insistence, her father Jayakeshi sent a marriage proposal to Karna, but Karna rejected the ugly princess. Mayanalla then came to Karna's court with her eight female companions, and threatened to commit suicide. Karna still refused to marry her, but unable to witness their deaths, Karna's mother Udayamati declared that she would die with the girls. As a result, Karna had to relent. He married Mayanalla, but kept neglecting her. Ultimately, she was able to win him over with help of a minister. Later, she convinced their son Jayasimha Siddharaja to waive the pilgrim tax. This is also attested by another chronicler.

The Kashmiri poet Bilhana also appears to allude to this incident. He stayed at Karna's court for sometime, and composed the poetic drama Karna-Sundari, which presents Karna as a hero. According to this work, Karna dreamt of the princess (called Karnasundari, or "Karna's beautiful woman"), and decided to marry her. His jealous queen attempted to get him married to a boy disguised in Karnasundari's dress. However, Karna's clever minister foiled her plan by replacing the boy with the real Karnasundari. Although Bilhana was a contemporary of Karna, his account is the least accurate one, because it is intended to be a drama. Nevertheless, his account is helpful in estimating the date of this marriage. Bilhana probably left Karna's court somewhere between 1072 and 1078 CE. Assuming that Karnasundari is same as Mayanalla, Karna's marriage to her would have taken place sometime before this.

It is difficult to determine whether Mayanalla was beautiful (as claimed by Hemachandra and Bilhana), or ugly (as claimed by Merutunga). Both Hemachandra and Bilhana wrote under Chaulukya patronage, so they had a vested interest in portraying Karna's queen in a positive light. Merutunga was not under any such pressure, but his account is fanciful and full of historical inaccuracies. For example, he claims that Jayakeshi's father was Shubhakeshi (it was actually Shashthi II). Merutunga further provides an absurd account of how Shubhakeshi chose to die with a tree in a wildfire, because he was grateful to the tree for having given him shade during a journey.

== Religion and constructions ==
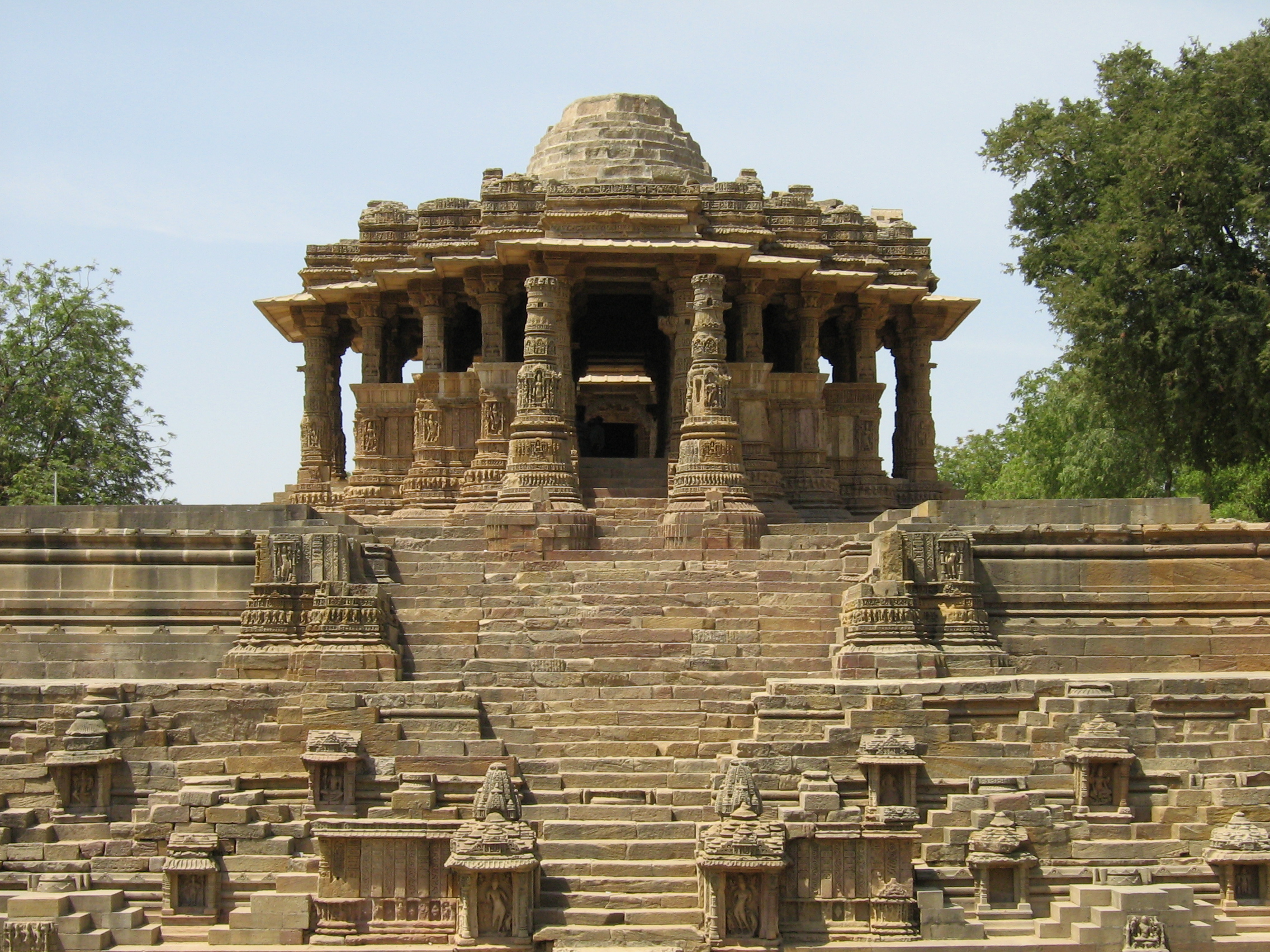
Rangamandapa and torana at Sun Temple, Modhera

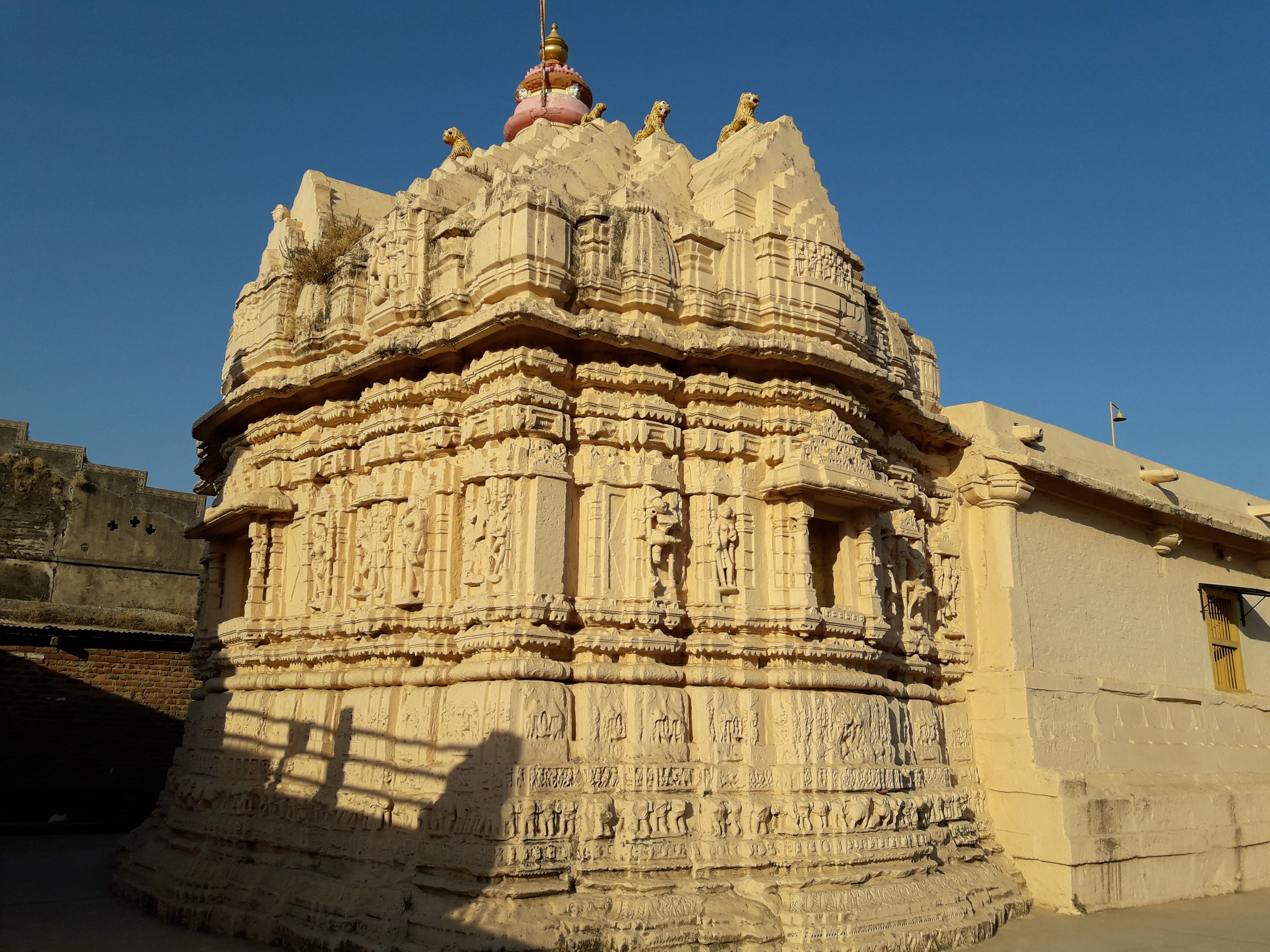
Brahma Temple, Khedbrahma

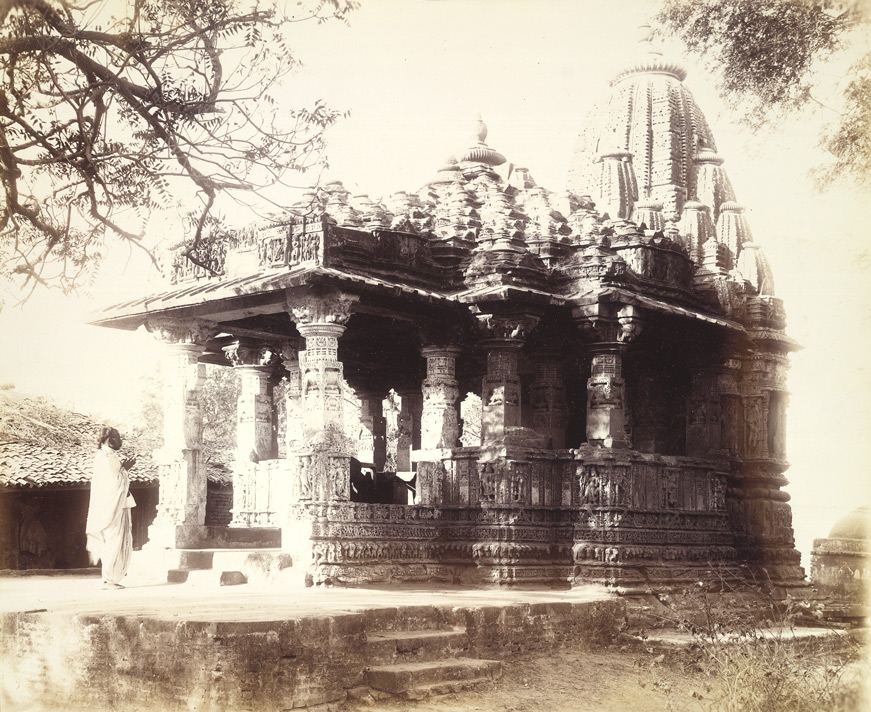
Nilkantha Mahadev temple, Sunak

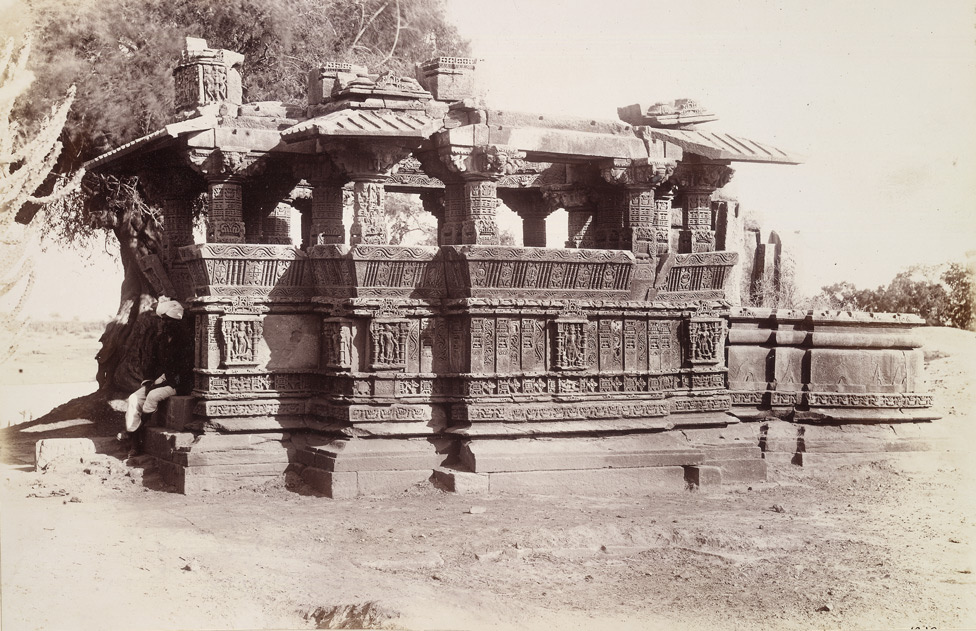
Limboji Mata temple, Delmal

Like his predecessors, Karna was a Shaivite, and is said to have built three temples. According to the 14th-century chronicler Merutunga, he built a temple dedicated to the goddess Kochharba at Ashapalli after defeating its Bhil chief Asha. He also established the Karnavati city nearby, where he commissioned the Karneshvara and Jayantidevi temples. He also built the Karnasagara tank at Gambhu near Modhera and Karnavati. In his capital Anahilapataka (now Patan), he erected the Karnameru temple. He is also ascribed a vapi at Bhadravati (Bhadreshwar). According to Hemachandra, Karna repaired a temple of the goddess Lakshmi, and prayed her for a son; as a result of the Lakshmi's blessings, Jayasimha Siddharaja was born to him. His minister Shantu built Shantu Vasatika at Karnavati, Patan, Vanka and Nihala. His another minister Munjala built Munjala Vasati at Patan somewhere before 1900 CE. Saliga Jinalaya or Sagal Vasatika was built in Khambhat before 1094 CE. None of these temples survives. According to Bhaktamara-stotra-vritti, Shreshthi Chanaka built Adinath temple at Patan. Minister Dhavala, nephew of Vimala, constructed Revanta-prasada. Vayatiya Vasati at Ashapalli probably constructed in early years of Karna, existed before Udayana arrived there. Udayana-vihaea in Karnavati was completed in 1093 CE. The temple is discussed in Mahendrasuri's Vadasthala and its rejoiner Prabodhyavadasthala by Jinapatisuri as it had raised controversies in 1192 regarding its sanctity due to its consecration by a Chaityavasi abbot.

Based on style-critical analysis, the rangamandapa and torana at Sun Temple, Modhera is ascribed the early years of Karna's reign. The extant temples built during this period include the Brahma temple at Khedbrahma, the Limboji Mata temple at Delmal, Nilkantha Mahadev temple at Sunak, the completely ruined Vishnu Temple on the bank of lake at Ganja, Dugdheshwara Mahadev temple at Madrodpur in Kheralu Taluka of Mehsana district. Shantinatha Jain temple of the group of temples at Kumbhariya belongs to this period. Lakulisha Temple at Pavagadh is stylistically attributed to this period.

Karna was also tolerant towards Jainism, as evident from Rajashekhara's 15th century commentary on Sridhara's Nyaya-Kandali. One legend claims that as Karna became a disciple of Vardhamana Suri, but this is historically inaccurate since Vardhamana Suri had starved himself to death at an earlier date.

According to Someshvara's Surathotsava Mahakavya, his ancestor Ama-sharman served as a priest (purohita) to Karna. The Chaulukya kings gave Ama-sharman a considerable amount of wealth, which he used to build Shiva shrines, dig ponds, and make donations to the poor. Someshvara claims that during Karna's invasion of Dhara, the priest of Dhara produced a demoness (krtya); Ama-sharman used mantras (chants) to protect Karna and defeat the demoness.

== In popular culture ==
The story of Karandev (Karna), Minaldevi (Mayanalla) and their son Siddhraj (Jayasimha Siddharaja) is depicted in the Gujarati historical fiction Patan ni Prabhuta (The Glory of Patan) by Kanhaiyalal Munshi.
