= Ashaval =

Original name of Ahmedabad, India

Ashaval or Ashapalli or Yashoval. Archaeological evidence suggests that the area around Ahmedabad in Gujarat, India has been inhabited since the 11th century, when it was known as Yashoval or Ashapalli or Ashaval. The city of Ashaval was located on the east of River Sabarmati. Ashaval's existence is traced from 9th - 10th century until the 13th century. The settlement near the bank of Sabarmati River, today the city of Ahmedabad, was earlier known as Ashaval or Ashapalli. In the tenth century, Ashaval was one of the chief places in Gujarat, as described by Al-Biruni.

== Area ==
The estimated area of Ashawal was from Calico Mills via Jamalpur Darwaja up to Astodia Darwaja. The hillock near Astodia Darwaja (the present Dhal-ni-pol area) was known as 'Asha Bhil-no-Tekro.'

== Rulers ==
Ashaval was initially ruled by a Bhil Maharaja Aasha Bhil, who was defeated by the Chaulukya(Solanki) king Karna (r. c. 1064–1092 CE). The 14th century chronicler Merutunga states that Karna established the city of Karnavati after this victory, which is identified with modern Ahmedabad by some scholars.
