= Udayaditya =

King of Malwa from 1070 to 1093

King of Malwa
- Reign: c. 1070 – c. 1093
- Predecessor: Jayasimha I
- Successor: Lakshmadeva or Naravarman
- Spouse: Chaulukya Princess; and various others
- Issue: Lakshmadeva; Naravarman; Jagadeva; Shyamaladevi
Regnal name
- Shrimad Udayadeva
- Dynasty: Paramara
- Father: Sindhuraja
- Mother: Unknown
- Religion: Hinduism

Udayāditya (reigned c. 1070–1093) was a Paramara ruler of Malwa region of central India, who succeeded Jayasimha I. He is known for driving out the Kalachuri King Lakshmikarna. He was succeeded by his son, either Lakshmadeva or Naravarman.

== Ascension ==
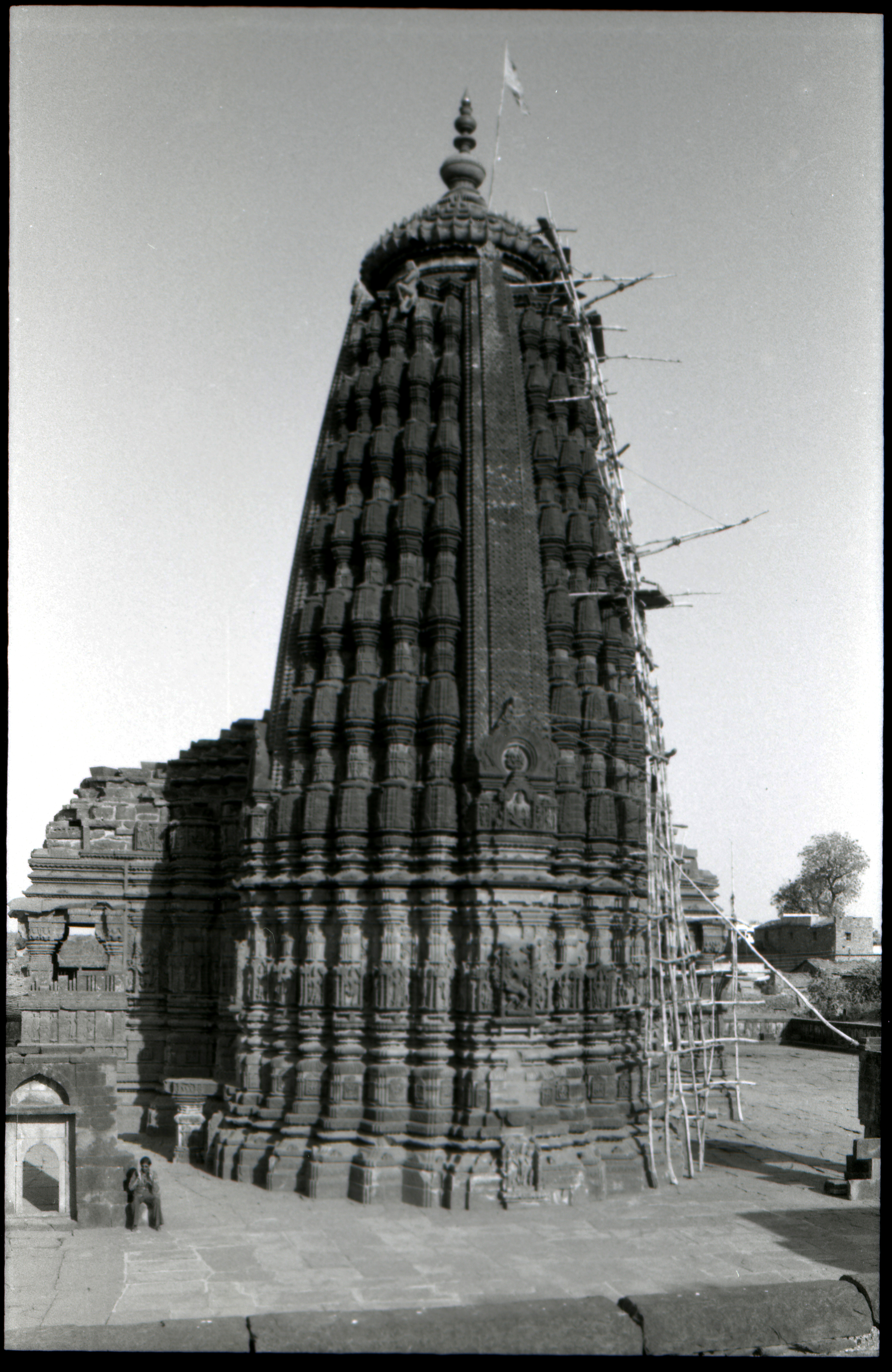
Shiva temple at Udaipur, Madhya Pradesh

Udayāditya was a brother of Bhoja, the most renowned king of the Paramara dynasty. At the time of Bhoja's death, the Paramara kingdom suffered simultaneous invasions from its Chaulukya and Kalachuri neighbours. Bhoja's successor Jayasimha, possibly his son, appears to have ascended the Paramara throne with the support of the Kalyani Chalukya prince Vikramaditya VI; he was probably dethroned by Vikramaditya's rival brother Someshvara II. After Jayasimha, Udayaditya ascended the Paramara throne.

== Reign ==
The Udaypur Prashasti inscription says that at Bhoja's death " Dhara was filled with a dense darkness by his foes and his hereditary warriors become infirm in body. Then arose king Udayaditya, another sun as it were, destroying the dense darkness......and gladdening the sight of his people by his splendour". According to the Nagpur inscription, "when he(Bhoja) had become Indra's companion, when the realm was overrun by floods in which its sovereign was submerged, his relative Udayaditya become king delivering the earth which was troubled by kings and taken possession of by Karna...... joined by Karnatas."

During Udayaditya's reign, Vikramaditya VI - who now held the Kalyani Chalukya throne - invaded the Paramara kingdom, and captured the territory to the south of the Godavari River. Udayaditya repulsed an invasion by the Chaulukya king Karna. He formed matrimonial alliances with his Guhila, Kalachuri, Vaghela, and Chaulukya neighbours to strengthen his position.

== Personal life ==
Udayaditya was Bhoja's brother, as attested by the Jainad inscription, which names Udayaditya as Jagadeva's father and Bhoja as Jagadeva's paternal uncle. He had three sons - Lakshmadeva, Naravarman, and Jagadeva; and one daughter - Shyamaladevi. His daughter Shyamaladevi married the Rawal of Mewar, The Guhila prince Vijaysinha, and gave birth to Alhandevi, who married the Kalachuri king Gayakarna.

Inscriptions recording grants made by and military achievements of both Lakshmadeva and Naravarman have been discovered. According to one theory, Lakshmadeva succeeded Udayaditya on the throne. An alternative view is that Lakshmadeva's grants and military successes happened during the reign of his father, and Naravarman succeeded Udayaditya on the throne.

Udayaditya appears to have had the hereditary fondness for literature and art, and to have brought up his sons as scholars, and his son Naravarman is believed to have been the author of more than one Prashasti.

== Coinage ==
The gold coins issued by Udayaditya are of 4.05 g weight. On the obverse of these coins the image of seated Lakshmi is depicted. On the reverse, the Devanagari legend, Shrimad Udayadeva is inscribed in three lines.
