= Yashahkarna =

Ruler of the Kalachuri dynasty of Tripuri in central India

Yashahakarna
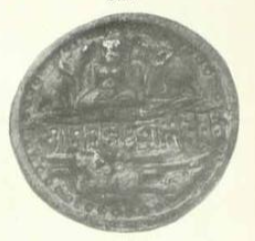
- Imperial Seal of Yashahkarna

King of Dahala
- Reign: c. 1073–1123 CE
- Predecessor: Karna
- Successor: Gayakarna
- Issue: Gayakarna
Names
- Yaśaḥakarṇadeva
- Dynasty: Kalachuris of Tripuri
- Father: Karna
- Mother: Avalladevi

Yashahkarna (Nagari: यश:कर्ण, IAST: Yaśaḥakarṇa; r. c. 1073–1123 CE) was a ruler of the Kalachuris of Tripuri and he ruled the Dahala Kingdom of Chedi region in Central India. He raided the Andhra region and the Champaran area in his early regnal years. However, the later years of his reign saw territorial losses and setbacks to the Kalachuri power. During his reign, the dynasty lost the northern parts of their kingdom, including Varanasi, to the Gahadavalas, and faced incursions and defeats at the hands of the Paramaras of Malwa and Chandelas of Jejakabhukti.

== Reign ==
Yashahkarna was a son of his predecessor Karna and the Huna princess Avalladevi. He ascended the throne around 1073 CE.

The 1076 CE Khairha (or Khairha) inscription of Yashahkarna states that he subjugated the ruler of Andhra, and worshipped the god Bhimeshvara with many ornaments. This likely refers to Yashahkarna's raid on the Vengi Chalukya kingdom in 1073 CE, durng the reign of Vijayaditya VII, and his worship at the Shiva temple in Draksharama. Historian N. Venkataramanayya notes that the complete absence of Vijayaditya VII's inscriptions in the years following the invasion appears to support Yashahkarna's claim of victory.

Yashahkarna also raided Champaranya, which V. V. Mirashi identifies as Champaran in Bihar.

Yashahkarna lost the northern parts of his kingdom, including Varanasi, to the Gahadavalas. The Paramara king Lakshmadeva raided the Kalachuri capital, Tripuri during his reign, while the Chandela king Sallakshanavarman defeated and subdued Yashahkarna.

== Religion ==
Yashahkarna was a follower of Shaivism. The name of his rajaguru (royal preceptor) was Purusha-shiva.
