= Pratipal Bhatia =

Pratipal Bhatia (1936-2024) was an Indian historian and numismatist, specialising in the coins of early medieval India. She was Professor of History at Delhi University.

== Biography ==
“Her doctoral thesis was published in 1970 as The Paramaras; it remains the standard historical reference for this central Indian dynasty.” – John Deyell

After completing her PhD on the Paramaras at Delhi University in 1962, Bhatia did post-doctoral studies at the University of Pennsylvania (1964-65) and the School of Oriental and African Studies, London (1967-69). She then returned to Delhi University and took up a position in the Department of History, eventually rising to Professor and Head of Department (1974-2001). After retirement, she became a fellow of the Asia Research Institute in Singapore (2002-2003), and a Senior Fellow of the History Department of the National University of Singapore (2004-2012).

She was a member of many societies: honorary member of the International Numismatic Council, and a fellow of the Royal Numismatic Society, Royal Asiatic Society, American Numismatic Society, Oriental Numismatic Society, and a life member of the Indian History Congress and the Numismatic Society of India.

Her memorial was held at Gurudwara Shri Rakab Ganj Sahib, in New Delhi, on 10 August 2024.

== Selected publications ==
- The Paramāras, c. 800-1305 A.D. (New Delhi, Munshiram Manoharlal, 1970).
- Emily Eden collection of Sasanian, Kushano-Sasanian, Kidarite and Indo-Sasanian type coins (British Museum, London)", Journal of the Oriental Society of Australia, 48, 2016, [97]-134.
- "Indo-Sasanian – An unpublished hoards of Indo-Sasanian type coins in the Allahabad Museum", Journal of the Oriental Numismatic Society 208 (2011), pp. 21-28.
- "Medieval India – An important unpublished Adivaraha coin in the Ashmolean Museum, Oxford", Journal of the Oriental Numismatic Society 205 supplement (2010), pp. 39-44.
