= Naravarman =

King of Malwa from 1094 to 1133

- Nirvana-Narayana
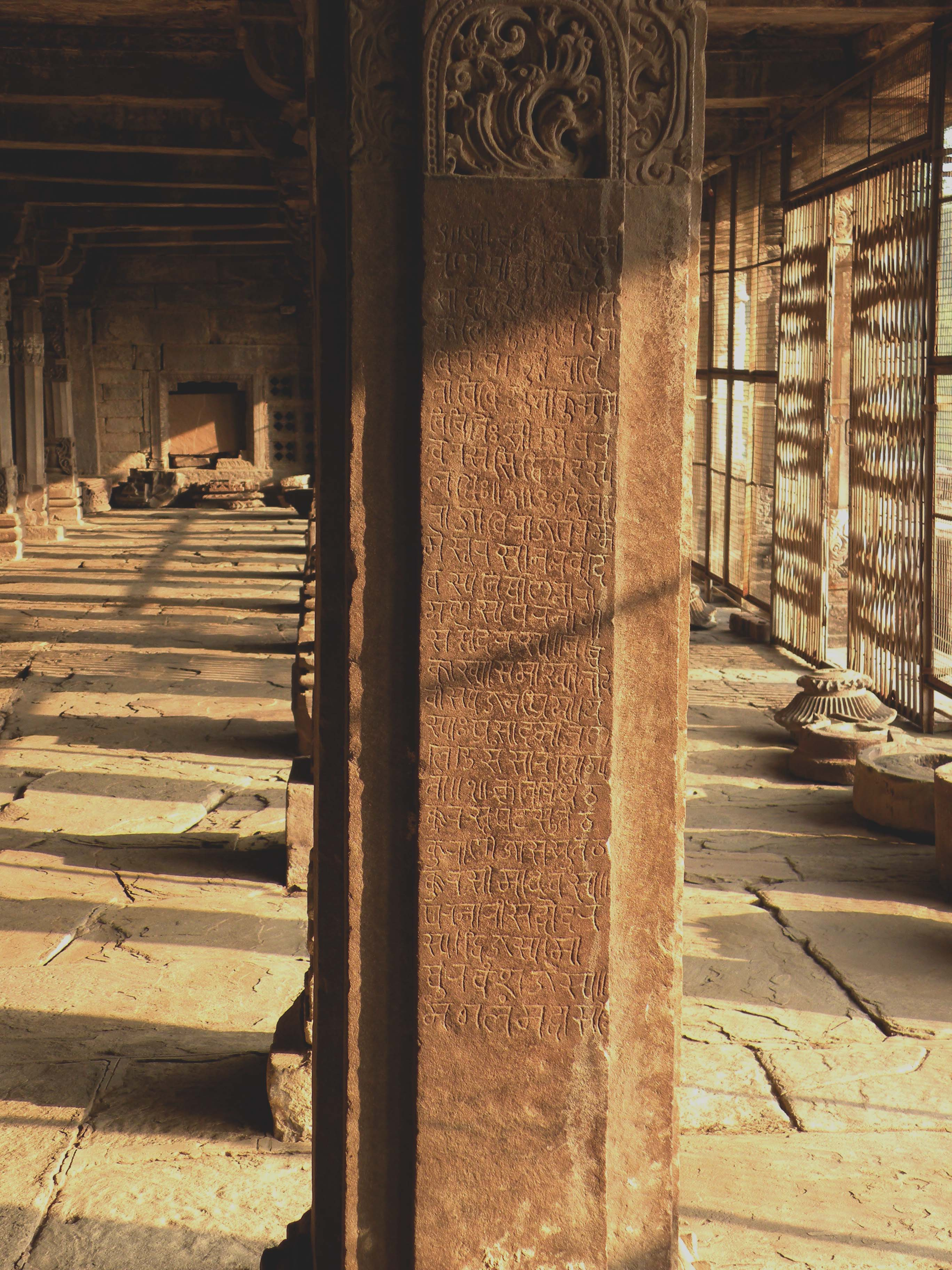
- Pillar in the Bijamaṇḍal, Vidisha with an inscription of Naravarman

King of Malwa
- Reign: c. 1094 – c. 1133
- Predecessor: Udayaditya; possibly Lakshmadeva
- Successor: Yashovarman
- Issue: Yashovarman
Regnal name
- Naravarman
- Dynasty: Paramara
- Father: Udayaditya
- Religion: Hinduism

Naravarman (reigned c. 1094–1133), also known as Naravarma-deva, was an Indian king from the Paramara dynasty, who ruled in the Malwa region of central India. The Paramara power greatly declined during his reign, as a result of multiple military defeats.

== Early life ==
Naravarman was a son of the Paramara king Udayaditya. Paramara inscriptions describe military exploits and grants of Naravarman and his brother Lakshmadeva, but it is likely that Lakshmadeva never ascended the throne. The Dewas grant inscription suggests that Naravarman succeeded Udayaditya on the throne. Lakshmadeva seems to have died sometime before 1082, as the 1082 Kamed inscription records a land grant made by Naravarman in his brother's memory.

== Military career ==
Some of the later Paramara inscriptions portray Naravarman as a great military leader who undertook a digvijaya ("conquest in all directions") campaign. For example, an undated fragmentary inscription from the Malwa claims that Nirvana-Narayana (a title of Naravarman) conquered territories as far as Himalayas in the north, Malayachala in the south and Dvarika in the west. Such descriptions are conventional poetic boasts: in reality, Naravarman was defeated by several other kings and also appears to have faced rebellions by his own subordinates. The Paramara-controlled territory decreased substantially during his reign.

Naravarman appears to have suffered at defeat against the Chandelas, who ruled the territory to the north-east of the Paramara territory of Malava. The contemporary Chandela king Sallakshanavarman claims to have "snatched the royal fortune of the Malavas".

He also suffered a defeat against the Chahamanas of Shakambhari. The Chahamana king Ajayaraja II captured his general Sollana. Ajayaraja also killed three noted warriors named Chachiga, Sindhula and Yashoraja, who appear to have been Naravarman's subordinates. The Bijolia rock inscription boasts that Ajayaraja's son Arnoraja humiliated Nirvvana-Naryana (that is, Naravarman). This may be a reference to Arnoraja's participation in his father's campaign against Naravarman, as a prince.

The Talwada inscription of the Chaulukyas, who ruled the neighbouring region of Gujarat in the west, state that their king Jayasimha "humbled the pride of Naravarman". In this campaign, Jayasimha appears to have been aided by his Naddula Chahamana feudatory Asharaja. The Nanana inscription of Asharaja's descendant Alhana boasts that when Asharaja arrived at the Paramara capital Dhara, Naravarman hid himself in the fort. The Sundha Hill inscription also states that Jayasimha was pleased with the Asharaja's assistance in the Paramara territory of Malava.

According to the Chaulukya chronicles written by Someshvara, Jinamandanagani and Jayasimha Suri, the Chaulukya king imprisoned Naravarman. However, other chroniclers such as Hemachandra, Arisimha, and Merutunga state that the Chalukya king imprisoned Naravarman's successor Yashovarman. The Chaulukya-Paramara war probably began during the reign of Naravarman, and ended during Yashovarman's reign.

The Ingnoda inscription of 1133-34 CE indicates that there was an independent kingdom north-east of Ujjain, and its ruler Vijayapala bore the title Maharajadhiraja-Paramesvara. This indicates that the Paramaras had lost control of this area by the end of Naravarman's reign.

== Cultural activities ==
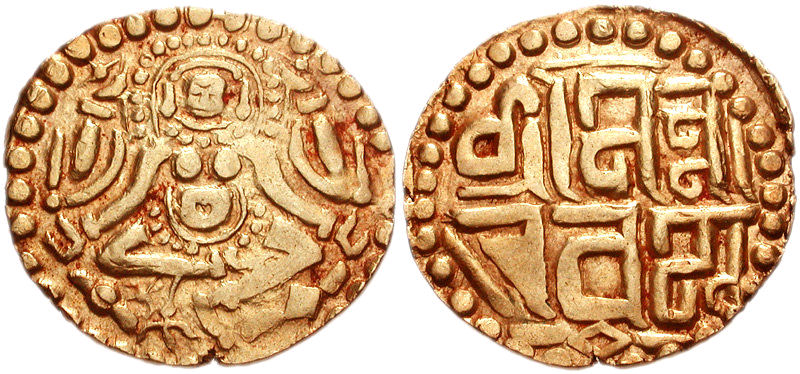
Coin of Naravarman. Goddess Lakshmi seated facing / Devanagari legend.

Naravarman was a poet, and composed hymns to various deities and eulogies of his ancestors. The Nagpur Prashasti may have been composed by him. He restored the Mahakala temple of Ujjain, and composed a hymn in the deity's honour. He started the construction of a temple at Vidisha, but was unable to finish it, probably because of military defeats and rebellions.

Gold (5.2 g), silver (2.9 g) and copper coins issued by Naravarman have been found in Indore.

According to the Rajatarangini, Naravarman gave asylum to the Kashmiri prince Bhikshachara, who had escaped a revolt. He brought up Bhikshachara like his own son, and trained him in use of arms and sciences.

== Inscriptions ==
Naravarman's inscriptions have been found at Amera near Udaipur (1093-1095 CE), Dewas (1094 CE), Bhojpur (1100-1101 CE), Nagpur (1104-05 CE), and Vidisha (undated). One more inscription was issued at Kadambapadraka (1110 CE), and was found in the possession of a resident of Bombay. H. V. Trivedi identifies Kadambapadraka with present-day Kamlikhedi (or Kamalyakhedi) village near Ujjain.
