= Chintaman Vinayak Vaidya =

Marathi writer and historian (1861–1938)

Chintaman Vinayak Vaidya (18 October 1861– 20 April 1938) was a Marathi-language historian and writer from Bombay Presidency, British India. He was Chief Justice of Gwalior State for a period. He was born in a Pathare Prabhu family originally from Bombay city.

In 1908, Vaidya chaired the Marathi Sahitya Sammelan held in Pune. Later, he became involved in the nationalist Congress Democratic Party, which was led by Lokmanya Bal Gangadhar Tilak.

== Works ==
The following is a list of the titles of his major works:

- Samagra Awalonnati Lekhamālā (1906)
- Mahābhārat — Samālochan (1914)
- Mahābhārat — A Criticism
- Nibandha Aṇi Bhāshaṇẽ (1915)
- Vālmīki-Rāmāyaṇ Parīkshaṇ (1920)
- Madhyayugīn Bhārat, Athawā, Hindu Rājyāñchā Udbhav, Utkarsh, Aṇi Uchchhed (1920)
- History of Mediaeval Hindu India, Being a History of India From 600 to 1200 A.D. (in three volumes) (Poona: Oriental Book Supplying Agency, 1921–1926)
- Downfall of Hindu India
- Shrī Kru̥shṇa Charitra (1922)
- Sanskrut Wāngmayāchā Troṭak Itihās (1922)
- Shriman Mahābhāratāche Marāṭhī Suras Bhāshāntar (1922)
- Durdaivī Raṅgū, Athawā, Pānipatachā Shewaṭacha Saṅgrām (1924) - a work of fiction based on the Third Battle of Panipat
- Early History of Rajputs (750 to 1000 A.D.) (Poona, 1924)
- Shrī Rām Charitra (1926)
- History of Sanskrit Literature (1930)
- Hindu Dharmāchi Tatwe, Arthāt, Yāsambandhĩ̄ Niranirāḷyā Wishayānwar Vaidyāni Dileli Wyākhāne Va Lihilele Lekh (1931)
- Vaidyānche Aitihāsik Nibandha (1931)
- Marāṭhā Swarājya Sãsthāpak Shrī Shivājī Mahārāj (1932)
- Shivaji – The Founder of Maratha Swaraj
- Saṅgīt Sãyogitā Nāṭak, Arthāt, Patinishṭhā (1934)
- Epic India, or, India As Described in the Mahabharat and the Ramayan (in two volumes)
- The Riddle of the Rāmāyaṇ
- Marāṭhī Bhāshechi Utpatti
