= Yashovarman of Malwa =

King of Malwa from 1133 to 1142

Yashovarman
- Maharaja

King of Malwa
- Reign: 1133–1142
- Predecessor: Naravarman
- Successor: Jayavarman I
- Issue: Jayavarman I; Lakshmivarman
Regnal name
- Yashovarma-deva
- Dynasty: Paramara
- Father: Naravarman
- Religion: Hinduism

Yashovarman (IAST: Yaśovarman; reigned 1133–1142) was an Indian king from the Paramara dynasty, who ruled in the Malwa region of central India. He was defeated and imprisoned by the Chaulukya king Jayasimha Siddharaja, and appears to have ruled as a Chaulukya subordinate after 1133.

== Early life ==
Yashovarman succeeded his father Naravarman. His 1135 Ujjain inscription mentions him as Maharaja Yashovarma-deva. This Sanskrit-language inscription records the grant of a village.

By 1134, the Chandela king Madanavarman had seized the eastern parts of the Paramara kingdom, along the Betwa River, as attested by his Augasi grant inscription. On the western frontier, Yashovarman suffered a defeat against the Chaulukya king Jayasimha alias Siddharaja.

== Defeat against Jayasimha Siddharaja ==
Location of Ujjain, where an inscription of Yashovarman has been found

Multiple sources, including chronicles and inscriptions, prove that Yashovarman was defeated by Jayasimha, the Chaulukya king of Gujarat. Some chronicles also suggest that it was Yashovarman's father Naravarman who was defeated by Jayasimha. It appears that the Chaulukya-Paramara war began during the reign of Naravarman, and ended during Yashovarman's reign.

According to the contemporary Chaulukya courtier Hemachandra, Jayasimha invaded the Paramara kingdom because he wanted to visit the holy city of Ujjain. Prabandha-Chintamani by the 14th century author Merutunga mentions a different cause for the war. According to Merutunga, Yashovarman invaded the Chaulukya capital when Jayasimha was away on a pilgrimage, and Jayasimha invaded the Paramara capital Dhara in response. Merutunga's account does not seem credible, because the Paramaras were too weak at this time to invade the powerful Chaulukya kingdom.

The 1139 Dahod inscription states that Jayasimha imprisoned the king of Malava (the Paramara territory), an assertion supported by Hemachandra. As a result of this defeat, a large part of the Paramara kingdom, including its capital Dhara, came under Chaulukya rule. Jaysimha appointed Mahadeva as the governor of Avanti-mandala (Malava). The Chaulukya king also adopted the title Avanti-natha ("Lord of Avanti"), as attested by his 1137 Gala inscription.

In an 1134 CE (1191 VS) inscription, Yashovaraman is titled Maharajadhiraja ("great king of kings"). However, in an 1135 inscription, he assumes the lower-status title Maharaja ("great king"). This indicates that he lost his status as a sovereign sometime during this period. It is not certain if this was because of Jayasimha's invasion or some other cause. Possibly, he was released by Jayasimha, and ruled a part of his former kingdom as a Chaulukya subordinate.

Dhara and Ujjain remained under Chaulukya control from 1136 to 1143.

== Last days ==
An inscription discovered at Jhalrapatan mentions Maharaja Yashovarman. The last digit of the year in which the inscription was issued is not clear, but it has been conjecturally dated to 1199 VS, that is, 1142 CE. If this date is correct, and if the ruler mentioned in the inscription is same as the Paramara king (an assertion doubted by some historians), it appears that he ruled until the early 1140s, possibly as a Chaulukya vassal. The find spot of the inscription suggests that he ruled a small principality in the lower Kali Sindhu valley.

Yashovarman was succeeded by Jayavarman I, who managed to regain control of Dhara, or at least a part of the former Paramara territory.
