= Lakshmadeva =

Lakshma

possibly a king of Malwa
- Reign: c. 1080s CE
- Predecessor: Udayaditya
- Successor: Naravarman
Regnal name
- Lakshma-deva
- Dynasty: Paramara
- Father: Udayaditya
- Religion: Hinduism

Lakshmadeva (IAST: Lakṣma-deva) was a member of the Paramara dynasty of Malwa region in central India. According to one theory, he ascended the Paramara throne after his father Udayaditya, and reigned during the 1080s CE. According to another theory, Lakshmadeva never became the king and Udayaditya was succeeded by Lakshmadeva's brother Naravarman.

== Political status ==
A 1104-1105 CE stone inscription, now kept at the Nagpur Museum, records several military achievements of Lakshmadeva. According to one theory, these achievements happened during the reign of Udayaditya, and Lakshamdeva never ascended the throne. His name is missing from the list of Paramara kings mentioned in Jayavarman II's 1274 CE Mandhata copper-plate inscription, which lists Naravarman as Udayaditya's successor. The Dewas grant inscription also suggests that Naravarman succeeded Udayaditya.

== Military conquests ==
The 1104-1105 CE Nagpur prashasti inscription credits Lakshmadeva with the following military achievements in the four directions:

- East: threatening the land of Gauda, defeating the armies of Anga and Kalinga, and occupying the city of Tripuri
- South: subjugating the Cholas, invading the Pandya country, and invading Sri Lanka
- West: attacking the Timingalas and other tribes of the Mainaka mountain
- North: vanquishing the Turushkas and the Kiras

This description appears to be a poetic exaggeration based on the victories of the legendary king Raghu, as described in Raghuvamsa. For example, Lakshmadeva's purported subjugation of the Cholas and the Pandyas is not supported by any historical evidence. However, some of the other achievements may have a historical basis. For example, the Kalachuris of Tripuri were weak after the death of their king Karna, and Lakshmadeva may have raided Tripuri during the reign of Karna's successor Yashahkarna. Historian D. C. Ganguly speculated that the claim of Lakshmadeva subjugating the Turushkas (the Turkic people) may be a reference to his repulsion of an attack by Mahmud of Ghazni. However, this is not correct, as Mahmud died in 1030 CE, much earlier than Lakshmadeva's time. Some other historians believe that Lakshmadeva might have defeated a Turkic Muslim governor of Punjab who invaded Ujjain, but this is not corroborated by any evidence.

== Death ==
Lakshmadeva must have died sometime before 1082 CE, as the 1082 CE Kamed inscription records Naravarman's donation of a plot of land "for perpetually burning a lamp for" (in memory of) Lakshmadeva.
