= Paramara dynasty =

Indian dynasty (948–1305)

Paramars of Malwa
- 948–1305
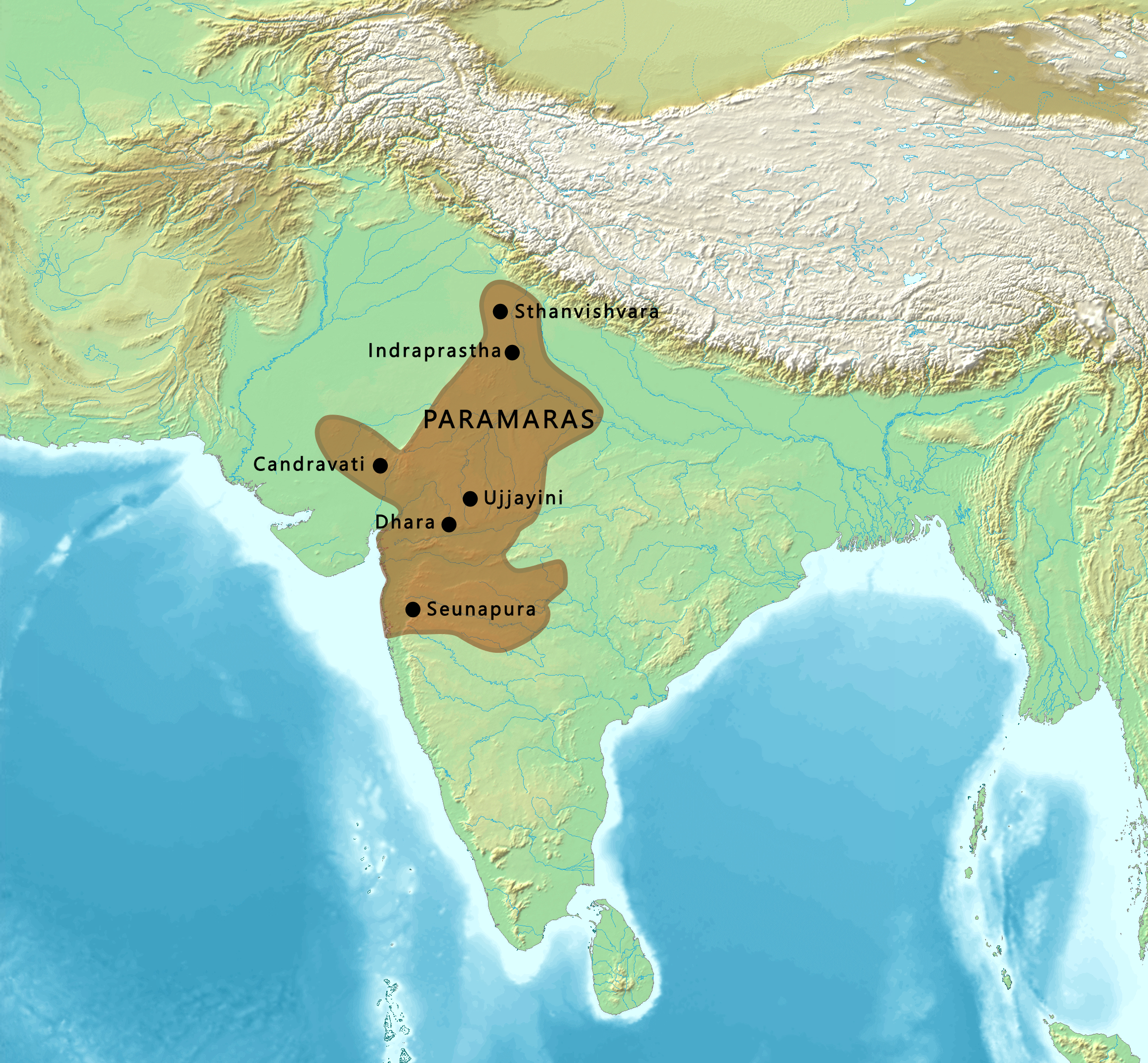
- Greatest extent of Paramaras under Emperor Bhoja c. 1055 CE.
- Capital: Dhar; Mandu
- Common languages: Sanskrit
- Religion: Shaivism; Jainism
- Government: Monarchy
- Maharajadhiraj
  - 948–972: Siyaka (first)
  - 1301–1305: Mahalakadeva (last)
- Pradhan
  - 948–?: Vishnu (first)
  - 1275–1305: Goga Deva (last)
- Historical era: Classical India
  - Established: 948
  - Disestablished: 24 November 1305
Preceded by
Rashtrakuta dynasty
Gurjara-Pratihara dynasty
Kalachuris of Tripuri
Succeeded by
Ghurid dynasty
Delhi Sultanate
- Today part of: India

The Paramara dynasty (IAST: Paramāra) was an Indian dynasty that ruled Malwa and surrounding areas in west-central India between 948 and 1305. They belonged to the Paramara clan of the Rajputs.

The dynasty was established in either the 9th or 10th century, and its early rulers most probably ruled as vassals of the Rashtrakutas of Manyakheta. The earliest extant Paramara inscriptions, issued by the 10th-century ruler Siyaka, have been found in Gujarat. Around 972, Siyaka sacked the Rashtrakuta capital Manyakheta, and established the Paramaras as a sovereign power. By the time of his successor Munja, the Malwa region in present-day Madhya Pradesh had become the core Paramara territory, with Dhara (now Dhar) as their capital. At its zenith under Bhoja, it ruled over an empire which extended from Chittor in the north to Konkan in the south, and from the Sabarmati River in the west to Vidisha in the east.

The Paramara power rose and declined several times as a result of their struggles with the Chaulukyas of Gujarat, the Chalukyas of Kalyani, the Kalachuris of Tripuri, Chandelas of Jejakabhukti and other neighbouring kingdoms. The later Paramara rulers moved their capital to Mandapa-Durga (now Mandu) after Dhara was sacked multiple times by their enemies. Mahalakadeva, the last known Paramara king, was defeated and killed by the forces of Alauddin Khalji of Delhi in 1305, although epigraphic evidence suggests that the Paramara rule continued for a few years after his death.

Malwa enjoyed a great level of political and cultural prestige under the Paramaras. The Paramaras were well known for their patronage to Sanskrit poets and scholars, and Bhoja was himself a renowned scholar. Most of the Paramara kings were Shaivites and commissioned several Shiva temples, although they also patronized Jain scholars.

== Origin ==
=== Ancestry ===
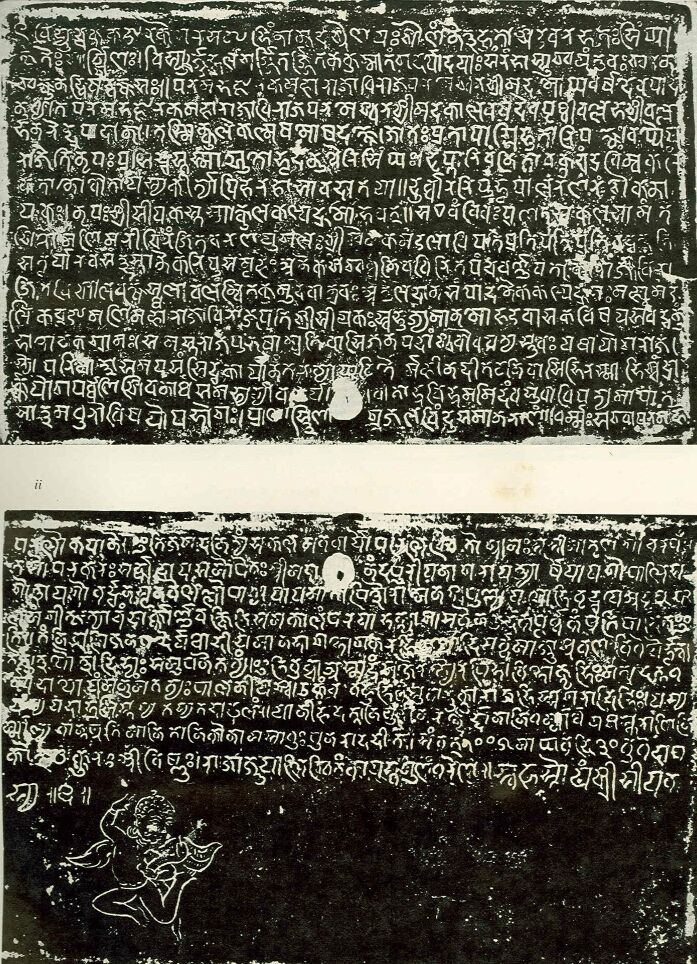
Harsola copper plates

The Harsola copper plates issued by the Paramara king Siyaka II in 949 mentions a king called Akalavarsha, followed by the expression tasmin kule ("in that family"), and then followed by the name "Vappairaja" (identified with the Paramara king Vakpati I). Based on the identification of "Akalavarsha" (which was a Rashtrakuta title) with the Rashtrakuta king Krishna III, historian as D.C. Ganguly theorized that the Paramaras were descended from the Rashtrakutas. Ganguly tried to find support for his theory in Ain-i-Akbari, whose variation of the Agnikula myth (see below) states that a predecessor of the Paramaras came to Malwa from Deccan. According to Ain-i-Akbari, Dhanji - a man born from a fire sacrifice - came from Deccan to establish a kingdom in Malwa; when his descendant Putraj died heirless, the nobles established Aditya Ponwar - the ancestor of the Paramaras - as the new king. Ganguly also noted Siyaka's successor Munja (Vakpati II) assumed titles such as Amoghavarsha, Sri-vallabha and Prithvi-vallabha: these are distinctively Rashtrakuta titles.

However, there is a gap before the words tasmin kule ("in that family") in the Harsola inscription, and therefore, Ganguly's suggestion is a pure guess in absence of any concrete evidence. Moreover, even if the Ain-i-Akbari legend is historically accurate, Aditya Ponwar was not a descendant of Dhanji: he was most probably a local magnate rather than a native of Deccan. Critics of Ganguly's theory also argue that the Rashtrakuta titles in these inscriptions refer to Paramara rulers, who had assumed these titles to portray themselves as the legitimate successors of the Rashtrakutas in the Malwa region. The Rashtrakutas had similarly adopted the titles such as Prithvi-vallabha, which had been used by the preceding Chalukya rulers. Historian Dasharatha Sharma points out that the Paramaras claimed the mythical Agnikula origin by the 10th century; if they had truly been descendants of the Rashtrakutas, they would not have forgotten their prestigious royal origin within a generation.

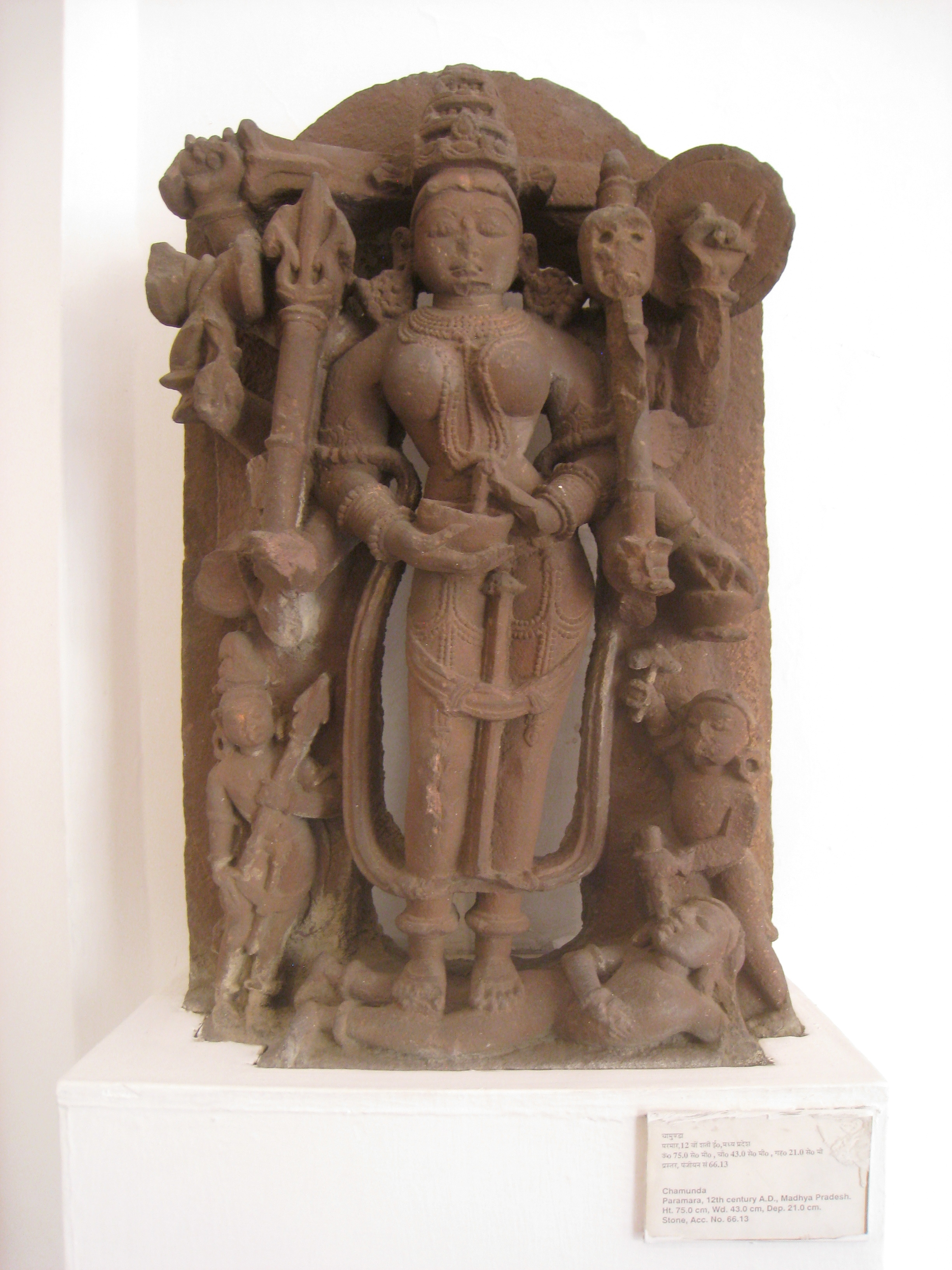
Chamunda, Paramaras, 12th century, Madhya Pradesh.

The later Paramara kings claimed to be members of the Agnikula or Agnivansha ("fire clan"). The Agnikula myth of origin, which appears in several of their inscriptions and literary works, goes like this: The sage Vishvamitra forcibly took a wish-granting cow from another sage Vashistha on the Arbuda mountain (Mount Abu). Vashistha then conjured a hero from a sacrificial fire pit (agni-kunda), who defeated Vishvamitra's enemies and brought back the cow. Vashistha then gave the hero the title Paramara ("enemy killer"). The earliest known source to mention this story is the Nava-sahasanka-charita of Padmagupta Parimala, who was a court-poet of the Paramara king Sindhuraja (c. 997–1010). The legend is not mentioned in earlier Paramara-era inscriptions or literary works. By this time, all the neighbouring dynasties claimed divine or heroic origin, which might have motivated the Paramaras to invent a legend of their own.

A legend mentioned in a recension of Prithviraj Raso extended their Agnikula legend to describe other dynasties as fire-born Rajputs. The earliest extant copies of Prithviraj Raso do not contain this legend; this version might have been invented by the 16th-century poets who wanted to foster Rajput unity against the Mughal emperor Akbar. Some colonial-era historians interpreted this mythical account to suggest a foreign origin for the Paramaras. According to this theory, the ancestors of the Paramaras and other Agnivanshi Rajputs came to India after the decline of the Gupta Empire around the 5th century CE. They were admitted in the Hindu caste system after performing a fire ritual. However, this theory is weakened by the fact that the legend is not mentioned in the earliest of the Paramara records, and even the earliest Paramara-era account does not mention the other dynasties as Agnivanshi.

Some historians, such as Dasharatha Sharma and Pratipal Bhatia, have argued that the Paramaras were originally Brahmins from the Vashistha gotra. This theory is based on the fact that Halayudha, who was patronized by Munja, describes the king as "Brahma-Kshtra" in Pingala-Sutra-Vritti. According to Bhatia this expression means that Munja came from a family of Brahmins who became Kshatriyas. In addition, the Patanarayana temple inscription states that the Paramaras were of Vashistha gotra, which is a gotra among Brahmins claiming descent from the sage Vashistha. However, historian Arvind K. Singh points out that several other sources point to a Kshatriya ancestry of the dynasty. For example, the 1211 Piplianagar inscription states that the ancestors of the Paramaras were "crest-jewel of the Kshatriyas", and the Prabha-vakara-charita mentions that Vakpati was born in the dynasty of a Kshatriya. According to Singh, the expression "Brahma-Kshatriya" refers to a learned Kshatriya.

D. C. Sircar theorized that the dynasty descended from the Malavas. However, there is no evidence of the early Paramara rulers being called Malava; the Paramaras began to be called Malavas only after they began ruling the Malwa region.

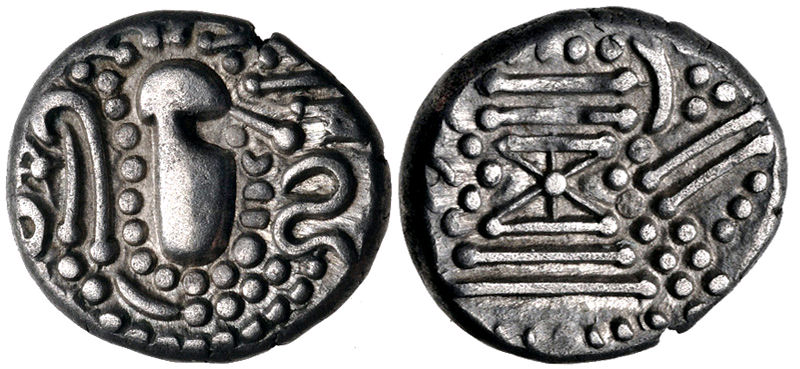
A Chaulukya-Paramara coin, c. 950-1050 CE. Stylized rendition of Chavda dynasty coins: Indo-Sassanian style bust right; pellets and ornaments around / Stylised fire altar; pellets around.

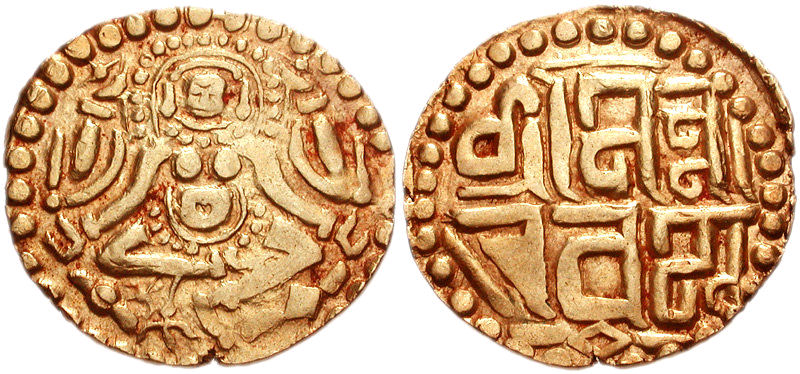
Coin of the Paramara king Naravarman, c. 1094–1133. Goddess Lakshmi seated facing / Devanagari legend.

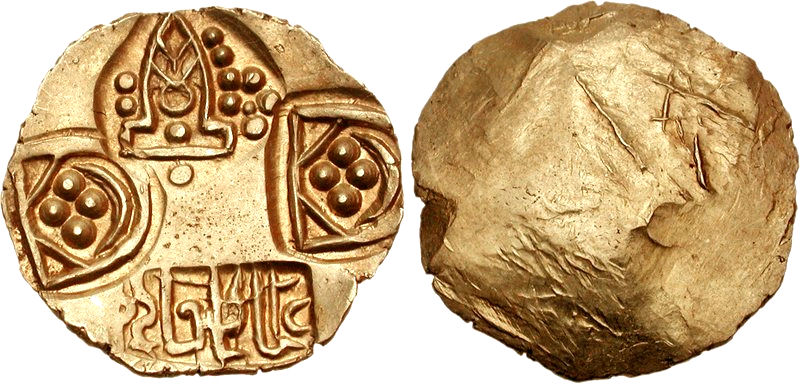
Coin of the Paramara prince Jagadeva, 12th-13th centuries CE.

=== Original homeland ===
Places in Gujarat where the earliest Paramara inscriptions (of Siyaka II) have been discovered

Based on the Agnikula legend, some scholars such as C. V. Vaidya and V. A. Smith speculated that Mount Abu was the original home of the Paramaras. Based on the Harsola copper plates and Ain-i-Akbari, D. C. Ganguly believed they came from the Deccan region.

The earliest of the Paramara inscriptions (that of Siyaka II) have all been discovered in Gujarat, and concern land grants in that region. Based on this, D. B. Diskalkar and H. V. Trivedi theorized that the Paramaras were associated with Gujarat during their early days. Another possibility is that the early Paramara rulers temporarily left their capital city of Dhara in Malwa for Gujarat because of a Gurjara-Pratihara invasion. This theory is based on the combined analysis of two sources: the Nava-sahasanka-charita, which states that the Paramara king Vairisimha cleared the Dhara city in Malwa of enemies; and the 945-946 CE Pratapgah inscription of the Gurjara-Prathiara king Mahendrapala, which states that he recaptured Malwa.

== Early rulers ==
Whether or not the Paramaras were descended from the Rashtrakutas, they were most probably subordinates of the Rashtrakutas in the 9th century. Historical evidence suggests that between 808 and 812 CE, the Rashtrakutas expelled the Gurjara-Pratiharas from the Malwa region. The Rashtrakuta king Govinda III placed Malwa under the protection of Karka-raja, the Rashtrakuta chief of Lata (a region bordering Malwa, in present-day Gujarat). The 871 Sanjan copper-plate inscription of Govinda's son Amoghavarsha I states that Govinda had appointed a vassal as the governor of Malwa. Since the Paramaras became the rulers of the Malwa region around this time, epigraphist H. V. Trivedi theorizes that this vassal was the Paramara king Upendra, although there is no definitive proof of this. The start of the Paramara rule in Malwa cannot be dated with certainty, but they certainly did not rule the Malwa before the 9th century CE.

Siyaka is the earliest known Paramara king attested by his own inscriptions. His Harsola copper plate inscription (949 CE) is the earliest available Paramara inscription: it suggests that he was a vassal of the Rashtrakutas. The list of his predecessors varies between accounts:

List of early Paramara rulers according to different sources
Harsola copper plates (949 CE)	Nava-Sahasanka-Charita (early 11th century)	Udaipur Prashasti inscription (11th century)	Nagpur Prashasti inscription (1104 CE)	Other land grants
	Paramara	Paramara	Paramara	Paramara
	Upendra	Upendra		Krishna
	"Other kings"	Vairisimha (I)		Krishna
	"Other kings"	Siyaka (I)		Krishna
Vappairaja	Vakpati (I)	Vakpati (I)		Krishna
Vairisimha	Vairisimha	Vairisimha (II)	Vairisimha	Vairisimha
Siyaka	Siyaka alias Harsha	Harsha	Siyaka	Siyaka

Paramara is the dynasty's mythical progenitor, according to the Agnikula legend. Whether the other early kings mentioned in the Udaipur Prashasti are historical or fictional is a topic of debate among historians.

According to C. V. Vaidya and K. A. Nilakantha Sastri, the Paramara dynasty was founded only in the 10th century CE. Vaidya believes that the kings such as Vairisimha I and Siyaka I are imaginary, duplicated from the names of later historical kings in order to push back the dynasty's age. The 1274 CE Mandhata copper-plate inscription of Jayavarman II similarly names eight successors of Paramara as Kamandaludhara, Dhumraja, Devasimhapala, Kanakasimha, Shriharsha, Jagaddeva, Sthirakaya and Voshari: these do not appear to be historical figures. HV Trivedi states that there is a possibility that Vairisimha I and Siyaka I of the Udaipur Prashasti are same as Vairisimha II and Siyaka II; the names might have been repeated by mistake. Alternatively, he theorizes that these names have been omitted in other inscriptions because these rulers were not independent sovereigns.

Several other historians believe that the early Paramara rulers mentioned in the Udaipur Prashasti are not fictional, and the Paramaras started ruling Malwa in the 9th century (as Rashtrakuta vassals). K. N. Seth argues that even some of the later Paramara inscriptions mention only 3-4 predecessors of the king who issued the inscription. Therefore, the absence of certain names from the genealogy provided in the early inscriptions does not mean that these were imaginary rulers. According to him, the mention of Upendra in Nava-Sahasanka-Charitra (composed by the court poet of the later king Sindhuraja) proves that Upendra is not a fictional king. Historians such as Georg Bühler and James Burgess identify Upendra and Krishnaraja as one person, because these are synonyms (Upendra being another name of Krishna). However, an inscription of Siyaka's successor Munja names the preceding kings as Krishnaraja, Vairisimha, and Siyaka. Based on this, Seth however identifies Krishnaraja with Vappairaja or Vakpati I mentioned in the Harsola plates (Vappairaja appears to be the Prakrit form of Vakpati-raja). In his support, Seth points out that Vairisimha has been called Krishna-padanudhyata in the inscription of Munja i.e. Vakpati II. He theorizes that Vakpati II used the name "Krishnaraja" instead of Vakpati I to identify his ancestor, in order to avoid confusion with his own name.

== Imperial Paramars ==
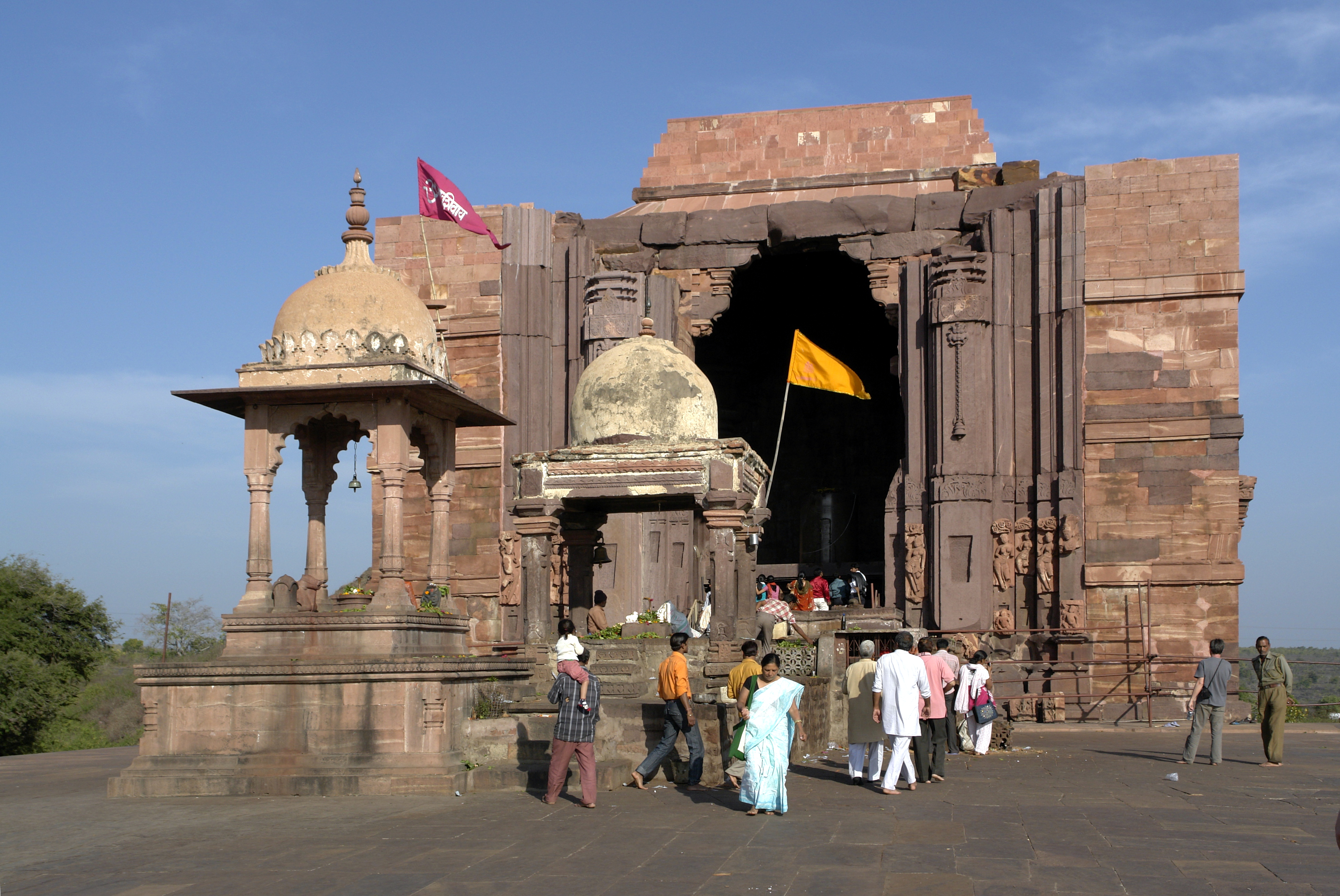
The Bhojeshwar Temple, Paramara dynasty, Bhojpur

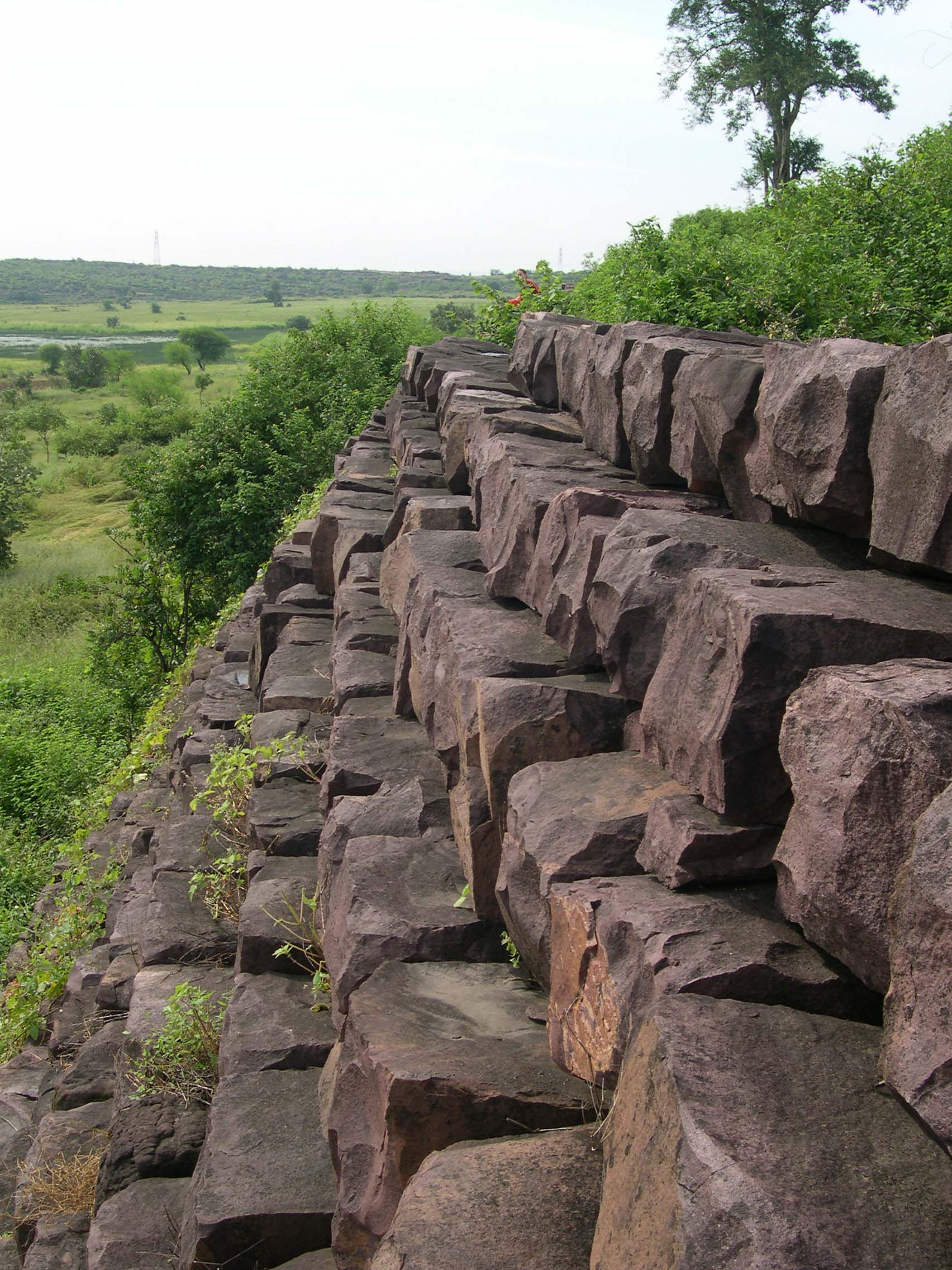
Detail of the masonry of the northern dam at Bhojpur

The first independent sovereign of the Paramara dynasty was Siyaka (sometimes called Siyaka II to distinguish him from the earlier Siyaka mentioned in the Udaipur Prashasti). The Harsola copper plates (949 CE) suggest that Siyaka was a feudatory of the Rashtrakuta ruler Krishna III in his early days. However, the same inscription also mentions the high-sounding Maharajadhirajapati as one of Siyaka's titles. Based on this, K. N. Seth believes that Siyaka's acceptance of the Rashtrakuta lordship was nominal.

As a Rashtrakuta feudatory, Siyaka participated in their campaigns against the Pratiharas. He also defeated some Huna chiefs ruling to the north of Malwa. He might have suffered setbacks against the Chandela king Yashovarman. After the death of Krishna III, Siyaka defeated his successor Khottiga in a battle fought on the banks of the Narmada River. He then pursued Khottiga's retreating army to the Rashtrakuta capital Manyakheta, and sacked that city in 972 CE. His victory ultimately led to the decline of the Rashtrakutas, and the establishment of the Paramaras as an independent sovereign power in Malwa.

Siyaka's successor Munja achieved military successes against the Chahamanas of Shakambari, the Chahamanas of Naddula, the Guhilas of Mewar, the Hunas, the Kalachuris of Tripuri, and the ruler of Gurjara region (possibly a Gujarat Chaulukya or Pratihara ruler). He also achieved some early successes against the Western Chalukya king Tailapa II, but was ultimately defeated and killed by Tailapa some time between 994 CE and 998 CE.

As a result of this defeat, the Paramaras lost their southern territories (possibly the ones beyond the Narmada River) to the Chalukyas. Munja was reputed as a patron of scholars, and his rule attracted scholars from different parts of India to Malwa. He was also a poet himself, although only a few stanzas composed by him now survive.

Munja's brother Sindhuraja (ruled c. 990s CE) defeated the Western Chalukya king Satyashraya, and recovered the territories lost to Tailapa II. He also achieved military successes against a Huna chief, the Somavanshi of south Kosala, the Shilaharas of Konkana, and the ruler of Lata (southern Gujarat). His court poet Padmagupta wrote his biography Nava-Sahasanka-Charita, which credits him with several other victories, although these appear to be poetic exaggerations.

Sindhuraja's son Bhoja is the most celebrated ruler of the Paramara dynasty. He made several attempts to expand the Paramara kingdom varying results. Around 1018 CE, he defeated the Chalukyas of Lata in present-day Gujarat. Between 1018 CE and 1020 CE, he gained control of the northern Konkan, whose Shilahara rulers probably served as his feudatories for a brief period. Bhoja also formed an alliance against the Kalyani Chalukya king Jayasimha II, with Rajendra Chola and Gangeya-deva Kalachuri. The extent of Bhoja's success in this campaign is not certain, as both Chalukya and Paramara panegyrics claimed victory. During the last years of Bhoja's reign, sometime after 1042 CE, Jayasimha's son and successor Someshvara I invaded Malwa, and sacked his capital Dhara. Bhoja re-established his control over Malwa soon after the departure of the Chalukya army, but the defeat pushed back the southern boundary of his kingdom from Godavari to Narmada.

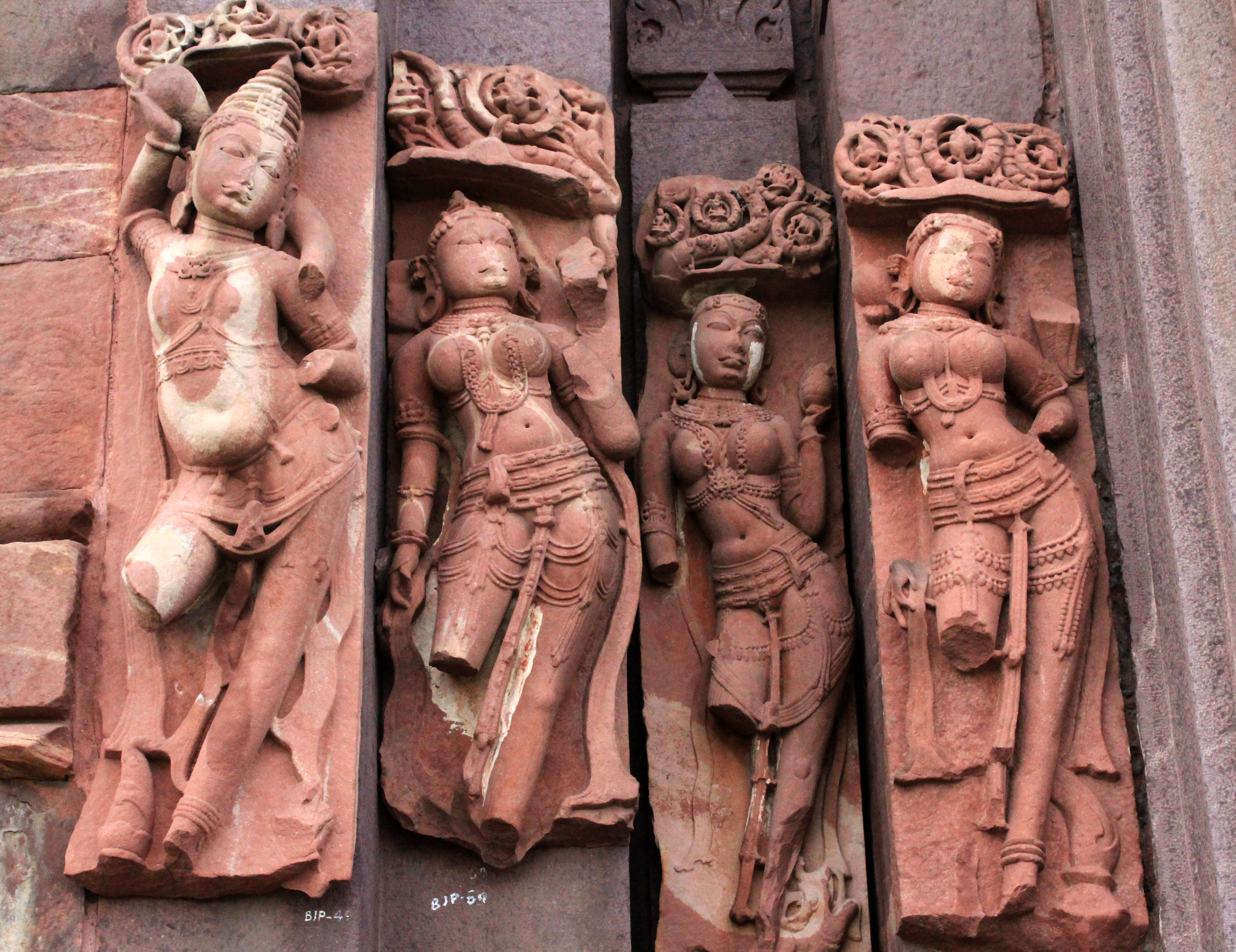
Statues at Bhojeshwar Temple, Paramara dynasty, Bhojpur.

Bhoja's attempt to expand his kingdom eastwards was foiled by the Chandela king Vidyadhara. However, Bhoja was able to extend his influence among the Chandela feudatories, the Kachchhapaghatas of Dubkund. Bhoja also launched a campaign against the Kachchhapaghatas of Gwalior, possibly with the ultimate goal of capturing Kannauj, but his attacks were repulsed by their ruler Kirtiraja. Bhoja also defeated the Chahamanas of Shakambhari, killing their ruler Viryarama. However, he was forced to retreat by the Chahamanas of Naddula. According to medieval Muslim historians, after sacking Somnath, Mahmud of Ghazni changed his route to avoid confrontation with a Hindu king named Param Dev. Modern historians identify Param Dev as Bhoja: the name may be a corruption of Paramara-Deva or of Bhoja's title Parameshvara-Paramabhattaraka. Bhoja may have also contributed troops to support the Kabul Shahi ruler Anandapala's fight against the Ghaznavids. He may have also been a part of the Hindu alliance that expelled Mahmud's governors from Hansi, Thanesar and other areas around 1043 CE. During the last year of Bhoja's reign, or shortly after his death, the Chaulukya king Bhima I and the Kalachuri king Karna attacked his kingdom. According to the 14th-century author Merutunga, Bhoja died of a disease at the same time the allied army attacked his kingdom.

At its zenith, Bhoja's empire extended from Chittor in the north to upper Konkan in the south, and from the Sabarmati River in the west to Vidisha in the east. He was recognized as a capable military leader, but his territorial conquests were short-lived. His major claim to fame was his reputation as a scholar-king, who patronized arts, literature and sciences. Noted poets and writers of his time sought his sponsorship. Bhoja was himself a polymath, whose writings cover a wide variety of topics include grammar, poetry, architecture, yoga, and chemistry. Bhoja established the Bhoj Shala which was a centre for Sanskrit studies and a temple of Sarasvati in present-day Dhar. He is said to have founded the city of Bhojpur, a belief supported by historical evidence. Besides the Bhojeshwar Temple there, the construction of three now-breached dams in that area is attributed to him. Because of his patronage to literary figures, several legends written after his death featured him as a righteous scholar-king. In terms of the number of legends centered around him, Bhoja is comparable to the fabled Vikramaditya.

== Decline ==
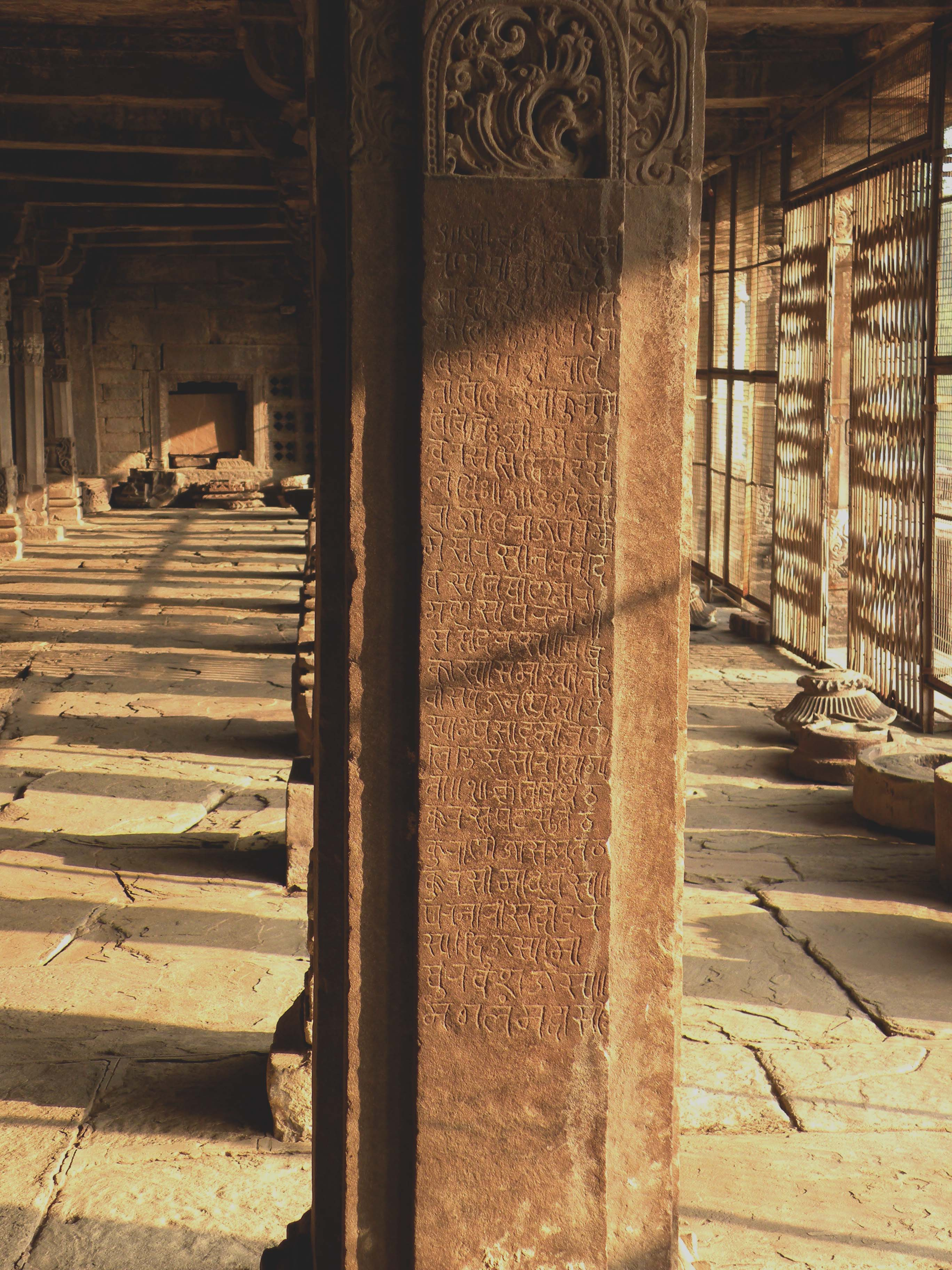
Pillar in the Bijamaṇḍal, Vidisha, with an inscription of King Naravarman (ruled c. 1094 – c. 1130 CE).

Bhoja's successor Jayasimha I, who was probably his son, faced the joint Kalachuri-Chaulukya invasion immediately after Bhoja's death. Bilhana's writings suggest that he sought help from the Chalukyas of Kalyani. Jayasimha's successor and Bhoja's brother Udayaditya was defeated by Chamundaraja, his vassal at Vagada. He repulsed an invasion by the Chaulukya ruler Karna, with help from his allies. Udayaditya's eldest son Lakshmadeva has been credited with extensive military conquests in the Nagpur Prashasti inscription of 1104-05 CE. However, these appear to be poetic exaggerations. At best, he might have defeated the Kalachuris of Tripuri. Udayaditya's younger son Naravarman faced several defeats, losing to the Chandelas of Jejakabhukti and the Chaulukya king Jayasimha Siddharaja. By the end of his reign, one Vijayapala had carved out an independent kingdom to the north-east of Ujjain.

Yashovarman lost control of the Paramara capital Dhara to Jayasimha Siddharaja. His successor Jayavarman I regained control of Dhara, but soon lost it to an usurper named Ballala. The Chaulukya king Kumarapala defeated Ballala around 1150 CE, supported by his feudatories the Naddula Chahamana ruler Alhana and the Abu Paramara chief Yashodhavala. Malwa then became a province of the Chaulukyas. A minor branch of the Paramaras, who styled themselves as Mahakumaras, ruled the area around Bhopal during this time. Nearly two decades later, Jayavarman's son Vindhyavarman defeated the Chaulukya king Mularaja II, and re-established the Paramara sovereignty in Malwa. During his reign, Malwa faced repeated invasions from the Hoysalas and the Yadavas of Devagiri. He was also defeated by the Chaulukya general Kumara. Despite these setbacks, he was able to restore the Paramara power in Malwa before his death.

Vindhyavarman's son Subhatavarman invaded Gujarat, and plundered the Chaulukya territories. But he was ultimately forced to retreat by the Chaulukya feudatory Lavana-Prasada. His son Arjunavarman I also invaded Gujarat, and defeated Jayanta-simha (or Jaya-simha), who had usurped the Chaulukya throne for a brief period. He was defeated by Yadava general Kholeshvara in Lata.

The Paramaras and neighbouring South Asian polities circa 1250 CE.

Arjunavarman was succeeded by Devapala, who was the son of Harishchandra, a Mahakumara (chief of a Paramara branch). He continued to face struggles against the Chaulukyas and the Yadavas. The Sultan of Delhi Iltutmish captured Bhilsa during 1233-34 CE, but Devapala defeated the Sultanate's governor and regained control of Bhilsa. According to the Hammira Mahakavya, he was killed by Vagabhata of Ranthambhor, who suspected him of plotting his murder in connivance with the Delhi Sultan.

During the reign of Devapala's son Jaitugideva, the power of the Paramaras greatly declined because of invasions from the Yadava king Krishna, the Delhi Sultan Balban, and the Vaghela prince Visala-deva. Devapala's younger son Jayavarman II also faced attacks from these three powers. Either Jaitugi or Jayavarman II moved the Paramara capital from Dhara to the hilly Mandapa-Durga (present-day Mandu), which offered a better defensive position.

Arjunavarman II, the successor of Jayavarman II, proved to be a weak ruler. He faced rebellion from his minister. In the 1270s, the Yadava ruler Ramachandra invaded Malwa, and in the 1280s, the Ranthambhor Chahamana ruler Hammira also raided Malwa. Arjuna's successor Bhoja II also faced an invasion from Hammira. Bhoja II was either a titular ruler controlled by his minister, or his minister had usurped a part of the Paramara kingdom.

Mahalakadeva, the last known Paramara king, was defeated and killed by the army of Ayn al-Mulk Multani, a general of Alauddin Khalji of the Delhi Sultanate, in 1305 CE.

== List of rulers ==
According to historical 'Kailash Chand Jain', "Knowledge of the early Paramara rulers from Upendra to Vairisimha is scanty; there are no records, and they are known only from later sources." The Paramara rulers mentioned in the various inscriptions and literary sources include:

List of Paramara dynasty rulers
Serial No.	Ruler	Reign (CE)
1	Paramara	mythical
2	Upendra Krishnraja	early 9th century
3	Vairisimha (I)	early 9th century
4	Siyaka (I)	mid of 9th century
5	Vakpatiraj (I)	late 9th to early 10th century
6	Vairisimha (II)	mid of 10th century
7	Siyaka (II)	940–972
8	Vakpatiraj (II) alias Munja	972–990
9	Sindhuraja	990–1010
10	Bhoja	1010–1055
11	Jayasimha I	1055–1070
12	Udayaditya	1070–1086
13	Lakshmadeva	1086–1094
14	Naravarman	1094–1133
15	Yashovarman	1133–1142
16	Jayavarman I	1142–1143
17	Interregnum from (1143 to 1175 CE) under an usurper named 'Ballala' and later the Solanki king Kumarapala	1143–1175
18	Vindhyavarman	1175–1194
19	Subhatavarman	1194–1209
20	Arjunavarman I	1210–1215
21	Devapala	1215/1218–1239
22	Jaitugideva	1239–1255
23	Jayavarman II	1255–1274
24	Arjunavarman II	1274–1285
25	Bhoja II	1285–1301
26	Mahalakadeva	1301–1305

An inscription from Udaipur indicates that the Paramara dynasty survived until 1310, at least in the north-eastern part of Malwa. A later inscription shows that the area had been captured by the Delhi Sultanate by 1338.

== Branches and claimed descendants ==
Besides the Paramara sovereigns of Malwa, several branches of the dynasty ruled at various places. These include:

- Paramaras of Chandravati
  - Ruled the Arbuda-mandala (Mount Abu area)
  - Became feudatories of the Chaulukyas of Gujarat by the 12th century
- Paramaras of Bhinmal-Kiradu
  - Branched off from the Paramaras of Chandravati
  - Like the Paramaras of Chandravati, they were connected to the Chaulukyas, and were subdued by the Chahamanas in the 12th century
- Paramaras of Jalor
  - Another branch of the Paramaras of Chandravati
  - Supplanted by the Chahamanas of Jalor
- Paramaras of Vagada
  - Ruled at Arthuna as feudatories of the Paramaras of Malwa
- Ujjainiyas of Bhojpur
  - The Rajas of Bhojpur belonged to the Ujjainiya branch of the Paramaras. Following the fall of the Kingdom of Bhojpur, several cadet families of this branch established many principalities in the Bhojpur region. One of the most notable principality was Dumraon.
- Sodhas of Amarkot
  - The Amarkot Kingdom ruled by Sodha Rajputs was annexed by Jodhpur State in the 18th century, which caused the decay of power as the Sodha rulers became vassals.
- Gandhavariya of Mithila
  - They claimed to be descendants of King Vikramaditya of Malwa and Paramara dynasty. They ruled various principalities in the Mithila region.
- Nimbalkars of Phaltan
  - Ruled at Phaltan as feudatories of Delhi Sultanate, Deccani Sultanate, Maratha Empire

The rulers of several princely states claimed connection with the Paramaras. Some of them are given below:

- Tehri Garhwal State: The Kingdom of Garhwal is said to have been founded by Kanakpal, a prince of Malwa. It was an independent Kingdom until 1804. However, Gorkhas invaded the Kingdom in 1804 and its ruler was forced to become a princely state in 1816 under British protection. They only received less than half of the territory from the British after this alliance.
- Baghal State: It is said to have been founded by Ajab Dev Parmar, who came to present-day Himachal Pradesh from Ujjain in the 14th century.
- Danta State: Its rulers claimed membership of the Parmar clan and descent from the legendary king Vikramaditya of Ujjain
- Muli State: Its rulers claimed Paramara descent, and are said to have started out as feudatories of the Vaghelas.
- Rajgarh State: The rulers of Rajgarh belonged to the Umath branch of the Paramaras.
- Narsinghgarh State: The rulers of Narsinghgarh belonged to the cadet branch of Rajgarh State.
- Chhatarpur State: The rulers of Chhatarpur belonged to the older branch of Paramara dynasty. They initially were vassals to Bundela Kings.
- Dewas State (Senior and Junior): The Maratha Puar rulers of these states claimed descent from the Paramara dynasty.
- Dhar State: Its founder Anand Rao Puar, who claimed Paramara descent, received a fief from Peshwa Baji Rao I in the 18th century.

== See also ==
- Bhojshala
- Panwar Dynasty
- Bhojeshwar Temple
- Military career of Bhoja
- Harsola copper plates
