= Jainad mandal =

Jainad
- Village
- Location in Telangana, India Jainad (India)
- Coordinates: 19.7333°N 78.6500°E
- Country: India
- State: Telangana
- District: Adilabad
- Elevation: 242 m (794 ft)

Languages
  - Official: Telugu
- Time zone: UTC+5:30 (IST)
- Postal code: 504309
- Vehicle registration: TS01
- Nearest city: Adilabad
- Climate: hot (Köppen)
- Website: telangana.gov.in

Jainath is a mandal located in Adilabad district in the state of Telangana in India.

The 11th century Jainad inscription was discovered at the Jainad village.
