= Lakshmikarna =

Ruler of Tripuri (c. 1041–1073)

- Chakravartin, Paramabhattaraka Maharajadhiraja Parameshvara
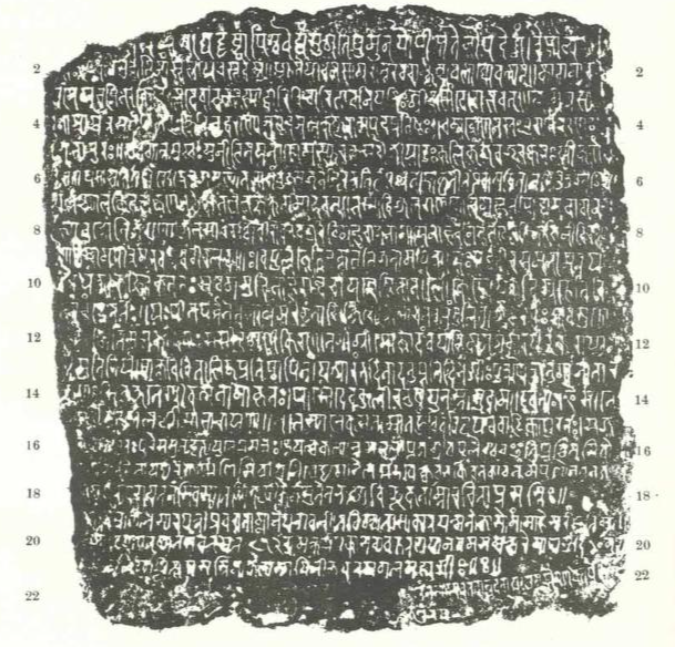
- Rewa stone inscription of king Lakshmikarna

King of Dahala
- Reign: c. 1041–1073 CE
- Predecessor: Gangeyadeva
- Successor: Yashahkarna
- Spouse: Avalladevi
- Issue: Yashahkarna
- Dynasty: Kalachuris of Tripuri
- Father: Gangeyadeva
- Mother: Demati

Lakshmikarna (IAST: Lakśmi-Karṇa; r. c. 1041–1073 CE), also known as Karna, was a ruler of the Kalachuri dynasty of Tripuri in central India. His kingdom was centered around the Chedi or Dahala region in present-day Madhya Pradesh.

The most famous king of his dynasty, Lakshmikarna raided territories of several neighbouring kingdoms, including those of the Chandras, the Cholas, the Kalyani Chalukyas, the Chaulukyas, the Chandelas, and the Palas. After several military successes, he assumed the title of Chakravartin in 1052-1053 CE. Around 1055 CE, he played an important role in the downfall of the Paramara king Bhoja, and captured a part of the Paramara kingdom of Malwa after Bhoja's death. By the end of his reign, however, he suffered several setbacks and lost control of Malwa to Bhoja's brother Udayaditya.

== Military career ==
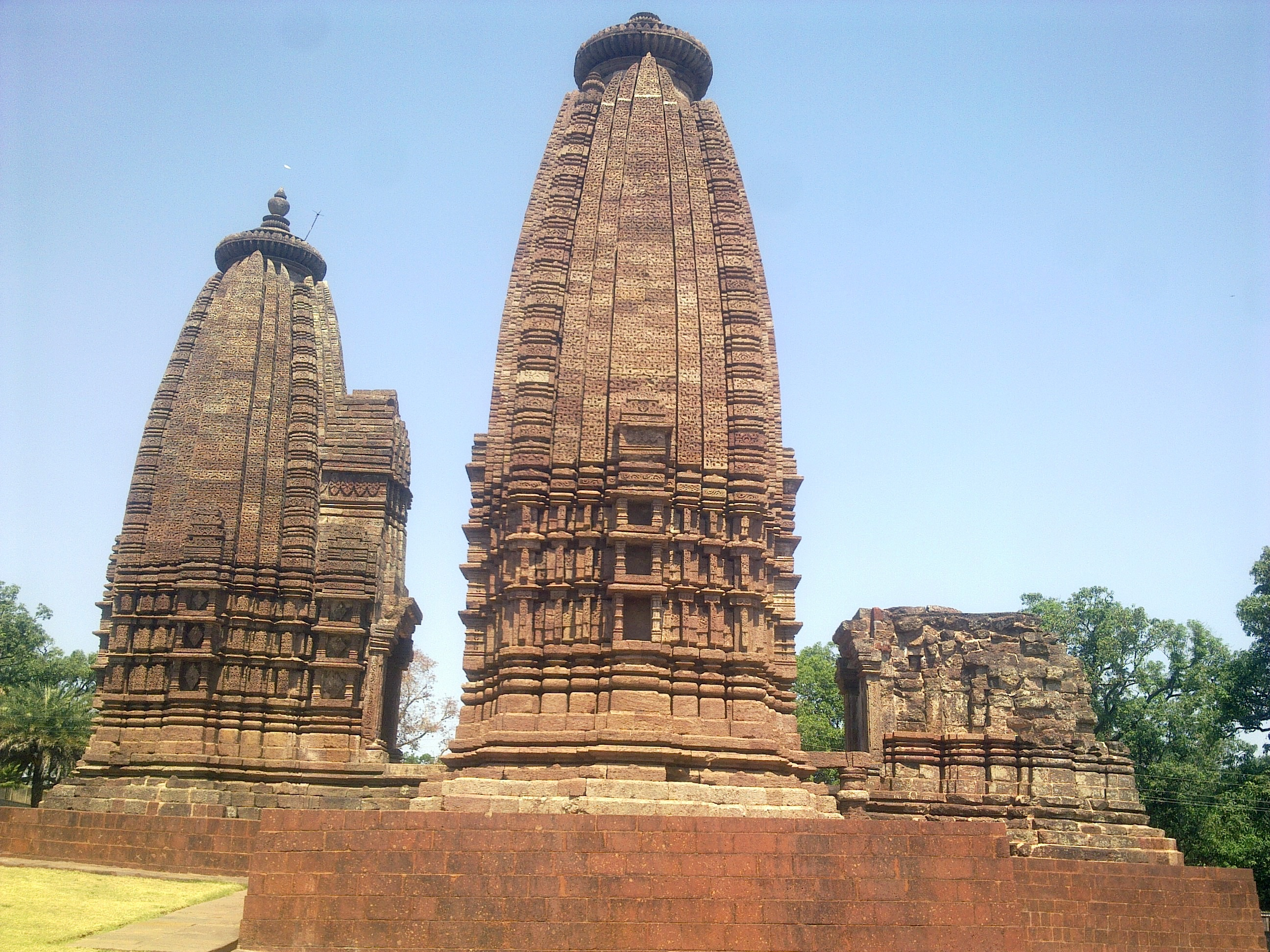
The Karan temple at Amarkantak, built by Lakshmikarna

Lakshmikarna succeeded his father Gangeyadeva on the throne of Tripuri in 1041 CE.

=== Early raids ===
The 1048-49 Rewa stone inscription describes Lakshmikarna's military successes in the eastern regions of Vanga (modern Bengal) and Anga. In Vanga, Karna defeated a Chandra king, possibly Govindachandra. He appointed Vajradaman as the governor of the captured territory. Vajradaman's son Jatavarman married Lakshmikarna's daughter Virashri, and later aided him in his Anga campaign.

The Rewa inscription also claims that Lakshmikarna attacked Kanchi in the south. This suggests that he fought with the Chola king Rajadhiraja.

In the inscription, Lakshmikarna claims to have seized the fortune of the king of Kuntala, who is identified with the Kalyani Chalukya king Someshvara I. However, the Chalukya court poet Bilhana claims that Someshvara destroyed the power of Lakshmikarna. This suggests that the war between the two kings was indecisive.

The Rewa inscription further states that Lakshmikarna invaded the Gurjara country, where he turned the local women into widows. An Apabhramsha verse cited in Prakrita-paingala also suggests that Lakshmikarna defeated a Gurjara king. This king can be identified with the Chaulukya king Bhima I. It appears that peace was established between the two kingdoms, as Bhima later participated in one of Lakshmikarna's campaigns.

=== Chakravartin ===
In 1052–1053 CE (804 KE), Lakshmikarna crowned himself chakravartin (universal ruler). This is attested by the Rewa inscription of his general Vappulla; this inscription is dated to Lakshmikarna's second regnal year as a chakravartin.

Lakshmikarna also bore the common grand titles Paramabhattaraka, Maharajadhiraja, and Parameshvara. He inherited the title Trikalingadhipati from his father. In addition, he also assumed the title Rajatrayadhipati (Lord of three forces: horses, elephants and men). His successors also continued to use these titles, although they were not as powerful as Lakshmikarna.

=== Bhoja and Bhima ===
Bhoja, the Paramara king of Malwa, had defeated Lakshmikarna's father Gangeyadeva. In the mid-1050s, Lakshmikarna and the Chaulukya king Bhima I formed an alliance against Bhoja. Bhima attacked Malwa from the west, while Lakshmikarna attacked it from the east.

According to the 14th century chronicler Merutunga, Bhoja died just as the two kings attacked Malwa. Bhima and Lakshmikarna had agreed to divide Bhoja's kingdom among themselves. But, Lakshmikarna annexed the entire Malwa region after Bhoja's death. As a result, Bhima invaded Lakshmikarna's kingdom and advanced up to his capital Tripuri. Lakshmikarna engineered a peace treaty by gifting him elephants, horses and the golden mandapika of Bhoja.

Lakshmikarna lost the control of Malwa within a few months. Bhoja's successor Jayasimha sought assistance from the Kalyani Chalukya king Someshvara I to restore the Paramara rule in Malwa. Someshvara sent his son Vikramaditya VI to help Jayasimha. Lakshmikarna achieved early successes against Vikramaditya, but was ultimately defeated. Jayasimha gained back his ancestral throne in 1055 CE.

=== Chandelas ===
Lakshmikarna subjugated the Chandela king Devavarman (r. c. 1050-1060 CE). The allegorical play Prabodha-Chandrodaya, composed by Chandela court scholar Krishna Misra, suggests that the Kalachuri king de-throned the Chandela king. Another literary work — Vikramanka-Deva-Charita by Bilhana — states that the Kalachuri king Lakshmikarna was like the lord of death to the lord of Kalanjara (that is, Devavarman). The later Chandela inscriptions credit Devavarman's successor Kirttivarman with resurrecting the Chandela power. Thus, it appears that Devavarman was killed in a battle against Lakshmikarna.

Lakshmikarna appears to have retained his control over a part of the Chandela territory for more than a decade. However, he was ultimately ousted by Kirttivarman, sometime before 1075-76 CE.

=== Palas ===
Lakshmikarna invaded the Pala-ruled Gauda region in the present-day West Bengal. A pillar inscription found at Paikar (or Paikore) in Birbhum district records the creation of an image at Lakshmikarna's order. This suggests that Lakshmikarna advanced up to as far as Birbhum district.

The Siyan stone slab inscription from Nayapala's reign states that Lakshmikarna was defeated. According to Tibetan accounts, the Buddhist monk Atisha engineered a peace treaty between Nayapala and the "king of Karnya of the West". Historian R. C. Majumdar identifies the second king as Lakshmikarna.

The 12th century Jain author Hemachandra states that Lakshmikarna defeated the king of Gauda, and that the king of Gauda offered Lakshmikarna a heavy tribute to save his life and his throne. According to V. V. Mirashi, this king might have been Nayapala's successor Vigrahapala III. The two kings ultimately concluded a peace treaty, with Lakshmikarna's daughter Yuvanashri marrying the Pala king.

=== Alliance with Someshvara II ===
After the death of the Kalyani Chalukya king Someshvara I, his two sons Someshvara II and Vikramaditya VI struggled to gain the throne. Lakshmikarna allied with Someshvara II, while the Paramara king Jayasimha sided with Vikramaditya VI. The combined army of Lakshmikarna and Someshvara II attacked the Paramara kingdom of Malwa, and captured it after dethroning Jayasimha. However, Bhoja's brother Udayaditya defeated Lakshmikarna, and took control of the Paramara kingdom around 1073 CE.

== Personal life ==
Lakshmikarna married a Huna princess called Avalla-devi. According to the Kalachuri inscriptions, Lakshmikarna crowned his son Yashahkarna as the king, which suggests that he abdicated the throne in favour of his son. This must have happened around 1073 CE, as a 1076 CE inscription of Yashahkarna mentions some of the new king's campaigns.

== Cultural contributions ==
Lakshmikarna was known as a liberal patron of arts and culture. He patronized several Sanskrit, Prakrit and Apabhramsha scholars. These included the Kashmiri Sanskrit poet Bilhana, whose Vikramanka-deva-charita states that he defeated one Gangadhara in a poetic competition held at Lakshmikarna's court. His other court poets included Villana, Nachiraja, Karpura and Vidyapati.

The 1076 CE Khairha inscription of Karna's son Yashahkarna states that Karna established a temple named Karna-Meru in Varanasi. According to scholar V. V. Mirashi, this temple was probably dedicated to Shiva. The inscription also states that Karna established a brahma-stamb[h]a named Karna-vati; according to Mirashi, who reads the word as Brahma-stambo, this was a Brahmana settlement.

According to Karna's 1042 CE inscription, issued from Prayaga and found at Varanasi, Karna performed the shraddha ritual at Prayaga to pay homage to his father Gangeya-deva. On this occasion, he granted the Srusi village in the Kashi (Varanasi) region to Pandita Vishva-rupa. His 1047 CE inscription, issued at Karna-tirtha and found at Goharwa, states that he granted the village of Chandapaha in the Kosamba region to Pandit Shanti-sharma. According to Mirashi, Karna-tirtha was likely the name of a ghat in Prayaga commissioned by Karna. Mirashi theorizes that Karna made Varanasi his capital, stating that Bilhana is said to have met the king at his court in Varanasi. However, Hans Bakker and Harunaga Isaacson doubt this theory, noting that the verse 92 of Vikramanka-deva-charita mentions Bilhana's visit to Varanasi and the verse 93 states that Karna "obtained" him: these verses do not necessarily suggest that Karna had a court in Varanasi where he met the poet.
