= Jayasimha I of Malwa =

King of Malwa from 1055 to 1070

- Parama-bhattaraka Maharajadhiraja Parameshvara

King of Malwa
- Reign: c. 1055 – c. 1070
- Predecessor: Bhoja
- Successor: Udayaditya
- Dynasty: Paramara

Location of Mandhata, where the only available inscription of Jayasimha has been found

Jayasimha (reigned c. 1055–1070) was the ruler of the Kingdom of Malwa in central India. He was the successor, and possibly the son, of the dynasty's most powerful king Bhoja. He appears to have ascended the throne with the support of the Kalyani Chalukya prince Vikramaditya VI, and appears to have been dethroned by Vikramaditya's rival brother Someshvara II.

== Source of information ==
The only known inscription that mentions a Paramara ruler named Jayasimha is the 1055-56 CE Mandhata copper-plate inscription. It is very similar to Bhoja's inscriptions, and records the grant of the Bhima village to Brahmins. The inscription is dated 1112 Vikrama Samvat; the exact date corresponds to either 27 May 1055 CE (assuming Chaitradi year) or 13 July 1056 CE (assuming Karttikadi year). It mentions Jayasimha's predecessors as Bhoja, Sindhuraja and Vakpatiraja. Jayasimha's titles and name are given as "Parama-bhattaraka Maharajadhiraja Parameshvara Jayasimha-deva".

No other Paramara inscription mentions Jayasimha. The Udaipur Prashasti and the Nagpur Prashasti of the later Paramara kings omit Jayasimha's name, and mention Bhoja's brother Udayaditya as the next king after Bhoja.

== Biography ==
Jayasimha was probably Bhoja's son. At the time of Bhoja's death, a confederacy of the Kalachuri king Karna and the Chaulukya king Bhima I had attacked Malwa. It is possible that Jayasimha and Udayaditya were rival claimants to the throne under these conditions.

Bilhana, a court poet of the Kalyani Chalukya king Vikramaditya VI mentions that his patron had helped re-establish the rule of a king in Malwa. Bilhana does not name the king of Malwa, but it appears that he was Jayasimha. P. N. Kawthekar theorizes Jayasimha sought help from the Chalukya king Someshvara I, who dispatched prince Vikramaditya to help Jayasimha ascend the throne.

After the death of Someshavara I, there was a war of succession between the Chalukya princes Someshvara II and Vikramaditya VI. It appears that Someshvara II considered Jayasimha an ally of Vikramaditya, and therefore, allied with Karna to dethrone him. Jayasimha may have been killed in the ensuing conflict. Later, Udayaditya ascended the Paramara throne, and salvaged the kingdom.
