= Chaurisurata Panchashika =

11th-century Indian poem by Bilhana

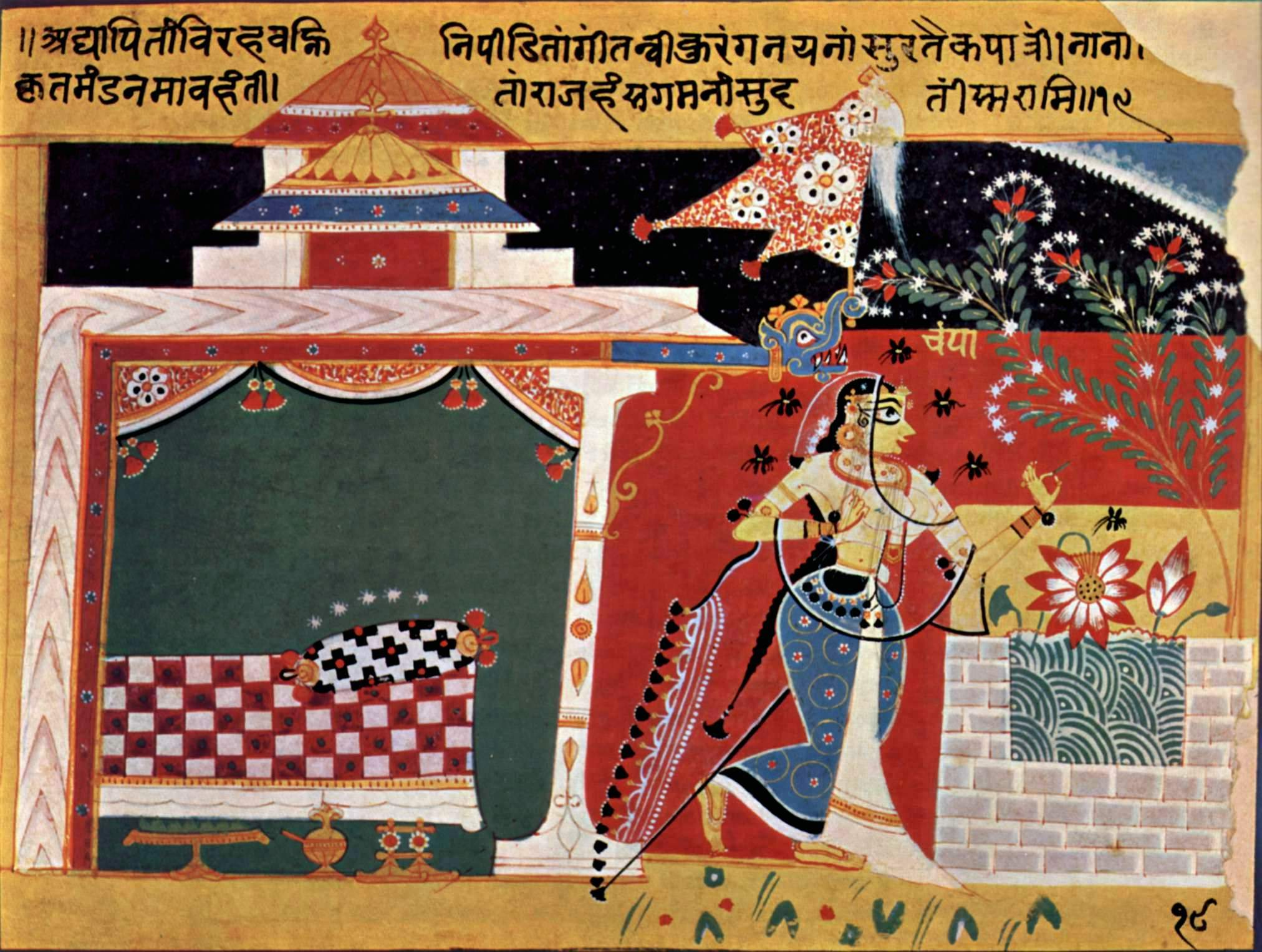
"Champavati by a Lotus Pond", folio from a Chaurisurata Panchashika manuscript. Second quarter of the 16th century. Lalbhai Dalpatbhai Museum

The Chaurisurata Panchashika (Sanskrit: चौरीसुरतपञ्चाशिका, romanized: Caurīsuratapañcāśikā, lit. 'Fifty verses by a thief'), also rendered the Chaura Panchashika, is a Sanskrit work of poetry traditionally attributed to the 11th century poet Bilhana, although this attribution is doubtful.

== Authorship ==
There are multiple manuscripts titled Chaura-Panchashika, which actually contain different poems that have only five verses in common. All these poems feature fifty verses in the vasanta-tilaka meter, each of which begins with the words "even now" (adyāpi), and features the speaker remembering his beloved. The five common verses may have been part of an original poem that inspired the different recensions.

The manuscripts variously name the poet as Bilhana, Chaura, or Sundara. The attribution of the poem to the 11th-century Kashmiri poet Bilhana is doubtful, because Abhinavagupta quotes some of its verses in his Abhinava-bharatu, a century before Bilhana. Moreover, the manuscripts of the poem's Northern recension generally place the love story in Gujarat, but the Shringara-Prakasha attributed to Bhoja (who died before Bilhana's arrival in Gujarat) quotes two verses from the poem.

== Legend of composition ==
The poem's manuscripts contain an introduction section describing how the poet's love story led to its composition. Depending on their location of composition, the various manuscripts can be divided into two categories: the Northern recensions and the Western-Southern recensions.

The Northern recension manuscripts typically narrate the following legend: King Vairi-simha (or Vīrasiṃha) of Patana appoints the young and handsome poet Bilhana as a teacher for his daughter Shashikala. Shashikala falls in love with him during a lesson on erotology (kāmaśāstra). Bilhana believes that the princess was his wife in a previous birth, and marries her in a secret gandharva ceremony. When the king learns of this, he becomes angry and banishes Bilhana. When Bilhana continues to send love-poems to the princess through messengers, the king orders him to be impaled to death. When Bilhana is about to be executed, the king asks him to remember his favourite deity, but Bilhana replies that he cannot remember anyone except Shasikla. He then recites 50 verses describing his love for Shasikala, which according to the legend, constitute the poem. Several manuscripts, such as the one from Kashmir, do not state whether Bilhana was killed or not, but in the texts Bilhaniya Kavya and Bilhaniya Charita, the king realizes that Bilhana sincerely loves Shashikala, and orders him to be released. The king allows the couple to remain together, and gives Bilhana wealth, villages elephants and horses.

The Western-Southern recension manuscripts, such as the Rahasya Sandarbha, typically narrate a similar story with different names: king Madanabhirama is the ruler of the Lakshmi-mandira city in the Panchala country. He appoints Bilhana, the best poet and scholar of his time, as a teacher for his daughter Yamini-purna-tialaka. Aware that Bilhana is a young and handsome man, the king devises a plan to prevent the princess from falling in love with him. He tells Bilhana that the princess suffers from leprosy, tells the princess that Bilhana is blind, and orders a curtain to be placed between the two during the lessons. One evening, Bilhana recites a verse about the beautiful full moon, and the princess realizes that he is not blind. She removes the curtain, and the two fall in love. When the king becomes aware of their affair, he orders Bilhana to be killed. Facing death, Bilhana recites the poem, recalling his time with the princess. The king is impressed, pardons Bilhana, and allows him to marry the princess.

The actual verses of the poem do not refer to these stories, and modern scholars have rejected the legend as inauthentic. For example, no king named Vairi-simha is known to have existed in Gujarat at Bilhana's time.

== Content ==
Each verse of the poem is of four lines (quatrain), beginning with the word "adyapi", which means even now written in the first person, "in which the parted lover evokes his mistress's presence by recollecting her beauty and the pleasures of their love."

The first verse of the poem is as follows:

Even now, I think of her of a bright colour like a garland of golden champaka, her face beaming like a full-blown lotus, with a thin line of hair (at the navel) just got up from sleep, her whole body showing the keen desire affected by passion of her like learning affected by intoxication.

== Editions and versions ==
In the nineteenth century the Caurapañcāśikā was 'discovered' by Europeans. The first French edition, published in the Journal Asiatique of 1848, was based on one of the South Indian versions with a happy ending. Sir Edwin Arnold did very loose translation with Tennyson-like cadences (London 1896); A. B. Keith provided a literal translation; Gertrude Cloris Schwebell, working from translations by S. N. Tadpatrikar, M. Ariel and Gerhard Gollwitzer, created a free verse rendering. However, the version best known to English readers is probably that by Barbara Stoler Miller; or the 'free interpretation' by Edward Powys Mathers (also known as E. Powys Mathers) entitled Black Marigolds. There is a 2000 translation, possibly privately printed, by John T. Roberts. Also there is the Love Lyrics / by Amaru [and] Bhartṛhari; translated by Greg Bailey; & by Bilhaṇa; edited and translated by Richard Gombrich published by The Clay Sanskrit Library in 2005. Dawn Corrigan has done an adaptation/rendition of the Caurapañcāśikā "Swan Song of the Thief" a free interpretation in 2013. There is also a 2013 translation The Caurapâñcâśikâ (The Love-Thief) Poetic rendering into English 2013.

== Appearances in modern literature ==
Several stanzas of E. Powys Mathers' "Black Marigolds" translation of Caurapâñcâśikâ appear in the novel Cannery Row by John Steinbeck. Author Victor Robert Lee credits E. Powys Mathers' "Black Marigolds" as the source of the phrase "savoring of the hot taste of life" in his novel Performance Anomalies, and uses Mathers' repetition of the phrase "Even now" from "Black Marigolds" as an element in lyrics spoken by Cono 7Q, the protagonist of Performance Anomalies.

== Translations ==
- Tchorapantchçat, publié, traduit et commenté par M. Ariel. Les Cinquantes (Couplets) de TCHORA ou Histoire de Bilhana; Journal Asiatique, Quatrième Serie, Tome XI, p. 469-534; Paris, 1848.
- Sir Edwin Arnold (London 1896)
- Pierre Rolland "les cinquante stances du voleur", Université de Provence, 1971
- Black Marigolds: A free interpretation of the Caurapañcáziká. E. Powys Mathers, pp. 66–77 in Mark Van Doren (Ed.) An Anthology of World Poetry (Albert and Charles Boni, 1928). Also reissued as Black Marigolds and Coloured Stars. Edward Powys Mathers (Anvil Press Poetry, 2004)
- Caurapañcáziká, an Indian Love Lament of Bilhana Kavi, critically edited with translation and notes by S. N. Tadpatrikar, Poona, 1946. Poona Oriental Series No. 86.
- German Free Version of Gerhard Gollwitzer. Des Pandit Bilhana Fünfzig Strophen von Heimlicher Liebeslust, Karl Schustek Verlag, Hanau, 2 Aufl. 1964.
- Gertrude Clorius Schwebel, The Secret Delights of Love by the pundit Bilhana (from the Sanskrit). (The Peter Pauper Press, 1966).
- A. B. Keith, A History of Sanskrit Literature (Motilal Banarsidass, 1993), 153-158
- Miller, Barbara Stoles. Phantasies of Love-thief: Caurapancasika Attributed to Bilhana (Columbia Univ. Press, 1971). And Bhartrihari and Bilhana (The Hermit and The Love–Thief) Penguin 1990.
- John T. Roberts, Caurapancasika, English and Sanskrit. The Thief, His Fifty Verses: Bilhana's Caurapancasika, The Northern Recension, with word by word grammatical notes and translations. (Papercraft Print, 2000). ISBN 0-9679677-1-6 / 0967967716
- Love Lyrics by Amaru [and] Bhartṛhari; translated by Greg Bailey; & by Bilhaṇa; edited and translated by Richard Gombrich published by The Clay Sanskrit Library New York University Press : JJC Foundation 2005 2005.
- "Swan Song of the Thief" An adaptation of Bilhana's Caurapâñcâśikâ by Dawn Corrigan a free interpretation online magazine otisnebula.com 2013
- The Caurapâñcâśikâ (The Love-Thief) Poetic rendering into English 2013
