= Bilhana =

11th-century Kashmiri poet

Bilhana was an 11th-century Sanskrit-language poet from Kashmir. He traveled to different parts of India, and received royal patronage from the Kalachuri king Lakshmi-karna, the Chaulukya king Karna, and the Kalyani Chalukya king Vikramaditya VI.

Bilhana's extant works include Karna-sundari Natika, a play composed at the court of Karna; the pangyeric mahakavya Vikramanka-deva-charita, composed at the court of Vikramaditya VI; and several verses found in various Sanskrit anthologies. The love poem Caurapañcāśikā is also attributed to him, although this attribution is doubtful.

== Early life and background ==
The 18th canto of Bilhana's Vikramanka-deva-charita contains his autobiography, and states that he was born in the village of Khonmusha in Kashmir. This village can be identified with the modern Khanmo, also called Khonmoh or Khunmoh. According to the 12th-century writer Kalhana, Khonmusha had been granted to Brahmins as an agrahara by king Khagendra; it was a peaceful village with pious people.

Bilhana belonged to a Brahmin family of the Kaushika gotra. He states that his ancestors were from Madhyadesha, and king Gopaditya had brought them to Kashmir. He describes his ancestors as follows: his great-grandfather Mukti-kalasha was proficient in the four Vedas, and performed Agnihotra. His grandfather Raja-kalasha was a religious scholar proficient in the shastras, performed several sacrifices, and established places for scholarly discourses and teaching. His father Jyeshtha-kalasha was also a scholar of the shastras, and became famous as a teacher for explaining a commentary on Patanjali's Mahabhashya to his students. Bilhana describes his mother Naga-devi as a lady renowned for her hospitality and piety.

Kashmir was reputed as a great centre of Sanskrit literature at that time, and Bilhana describes poetry and saffron as "two beautiful creations" of the land. He describes the city of Pravarapura (modern Pampar near Srinagar), located on the banks of the Vitasta (Jhelum) river, as the residence of great Sanskrit scholars.

Bilhana likely lived in Kashmir during the reigns of the Lohara kings Ananta and his son Kalasha. He praises Ananta (r. c. 1028-1063) as a truthful, liberal and brave king; and also praises Ananta's queen Subhata for her generous donations to Brahmins and religious institutions. He also praises Kshiti-pati, who controlled the fort of Lohara, and was possibly a relative of the king. Bilhana compares Kshiti-pati to Bhoja as a learned patron of literature, stating that scholars attended his court.

Bilhana praises Ananta's son Kalasha (r. c. 1063-1084) as a brave king, and alludes to his military conquests. Unlike Kalhana, who describes Kalasha as an immoral and notorious king responsible for the death of his father, Bilhana does not portray Kalasha negatively. Kalhana states that Bilhana left Kashmir during the reign of Kalasha. Possibly, Bilhana was away from Kashmir when Kalasha gained notoriety for his negative acts, or he did not consider it appropriate to portray a contemporary king negatively. Since Kalasha ascended the throne around 1063, Bilhana must have left Kashmir around this time. Scholar P.N. Kawthekar theorizes that he must have been around 40 years old at this time, since his writings suggest that he was already a proficient scholar by this time; Kawthekar thus assigns his birth date to c. 1020 CE.

== Journey across India ==
Bilhana states that after leaving Kashmir, he visited Mathura-Vrindavana area, where he defeated a group of scholars in a shastrartha debate. He lived in the area for a few days, and became famous there through his students, which suggests that he taught as a guru. Next, he visited Kanyakubja (modern Kannauj): he states that his fame had reached there even before his arrival. He appears to have collected some wealth by the time he left Kanyakubja, as he states he donated wealth among Brahmins at Prayaga. Bilhana does not name the rulers of these places, but states that he had collected sin while meeting some bad rulers, and that he washed off this sin by bathing in the holy Ganga River at Varanasi.

Bilhana subsequently visited the court of the Kalachuri king Karna (r. c. 1041–1073 CE), who honored him, impressed by his recital of poems. (Note: Scholar V. V. Mirashi theorizes that Karna moved his capital from Tripuri to Varanasi, where he met Bilhana. However, according to Hans Bakker and Harunaga Isaacson, there is no evidence that Varanasi was the king's capital. The verse 92 of Vikramanka-deva-charita mentions Bilhana's visit to Varanasi and the verse 93 states that Karna "obtained" him: these verses do not necessarily suggest that Karna had a court in Varanasi where he met the poet.) Bilahana states that he defeated Gangadhara, a famous scholar in Karna's court, in a shastrartha. He mentions that he composed verses praising Rama, and Ayodhya, the city associated with Rama. These verses are now lost, and it is not certain if Bilhana visited Ayodhya or composed these verses in Varanasi.

Bilhana then proceeded to Dhara, hoping to meet the Paramara king Bhoja, who was famous as a patron of art and literature. However, upon reaching Dhara, he was disappointed to find that Bhoja had died.

Bilhana then visited Gujarat, during the reign of the Chaulukya king Karna (r.c. 1064–1092 CE). He was initially unhappy about the local people's "way of wearing clothes" and their "bad language", but was satisfied after visiting the Somanatha shrine. Bilhana appears to have spent considerable time in Patana, the capital of king Karna. There, he composed Karna-sundari Natika, a play that was staged at the king's court.

Next, Bilhana passed through the Konkan region and the Chalukya kingdom, on his way to Rameshwaram.

=== At Kalyana ===
Sometime after 1076, Bilhana returned to the Chalukya kingdom, and sought the patronage of king Vikramaditya VI (r. c. 1076–1126). He completed his mahakavya, the Vikramanka-deva-charita, in 1087 or early 1087 CE, at the Chalukya capital Kalyana. In this text, he describes his patron as the most ideal king. He states that the king honored him with the post of Vidyapati, allowed him to use a black umbrella as a sign of royal honour bestowed upon him, and awarded a band of elephants to him. He adds that he became immensely wealthy in Kalyana.

Bilhana does not mention the king's 1088 CE military campaign beyond the Narmada River, which suggests that he had left Kalyana by early 1088 CE. Based on Bilhana's seemingly ambivalent descriptions of kingship in the Vikramanka-deva-charita, as well as some other verses attributed to him, some modern scholars theorize that Bilhana may have fallen out of favour with Vikramaditya VI. Shridhara-dasa's Sadukti-karnamrita, a 13th-century anthology of Sanskrit poetry, attributes a verse to Bilhana (Silhana in some editions); in this verse, Bilhana declares that even if the king of Kuntala takes all his wealth, he still has the treasure of Sarasvati (the goddess of learning) in his heart. This suggests that Vikramaditya VI, who ruled over Kuntala, became displeased with Bilhana for some reason, and confiscated his wealth. (Note: Some texts, such as the Kashmiri recension of Chaura-Panchashika, place this verse in Bilhana's love story, as he faces execution. (See #Legacy and popular culture)) The last verses of the Vikramanka-deva-charita remind kings that death is inevitable for them, and advise them to respect and not hate poets who make them 'immortal'. While the text praises Vikramaditya, it also suggests that the king may not be as virtuous the text proclaims him to be, and that the poetry has the power to fabricate a positive image of the royalty. While comparing Vikramaditya to the legendary hero Rama, Bilhana also suggests that Rama's own reputation may have been result of his panegyrist's skill rather than his own virtue. M. Krishnamachariar (1937) speculates that Bilhana's more favourable poetic description of the Kashmiri kings, or his inclusion of an autobiographical account in the Vikramanka-deva-charita, may have offended Vikramaditya VI.

== Last days ==
At the end of the Vikramanka-deva-charita, Bilhana states that he wished to return to Kashmir to enjoy the patronage of king Harsha (r. c. 1084-1101), the son of Kalasha. Bilhana describes Harsha as a famous poet and a patron of scholars. Kalhana states that when Bilhana (then in Kalyana) heard about Harsha's generosity, he regarded the wealth he had earned in the south as worthless. Since Harsha ascended the throne in 1089, Bilhana must have been alive after 1089.

Bilhana mentions that he wished to spend his last days on the banks of the holy Ganga River. Kawthekar notes that Bilhana does not mention Harsha's death in 1101 CE, and therefore assumes that Bilhana died in the previous decade, possibly around 1094 CE.

Kawthekar theorizes that Bilhana may have spent his last days in the Paramara kingdom. A fragmentary inscription discovered at Mandu contains a hymn to Vishnu (Vishnu-strotra) attributed to a 12th-century poet named Bilhana. The concluding lines of the hymn state that this Bilhana was the favourite minister of the Paramara king Vindhya-varman (r. c. 1175-1194 CE), and that the succeeding king Subhata-varman (r.c. 1194–1209 CE) highly respected him. Ashadhara, a contemporary Jain scholar, describes this Bilhana as the "king of poets" and as the prime minister of king Vindhya-varman. Kawthekar theorizes that the 12th-century poet Bilhana may have been a son or grandson of the 11th-century poet Bilhana.

== Legacy and popular culture ==
According to Mankhaka, Bilhana's poetry inspired Kalhana.

Bilhana's extant writings do not mention a wife, but some later legends mention a love story with him as a hero. Several manuscripts of romantic poetry, titled Chaura-Panchashika, are attributed to Bilhana (some of them alternatively name the poet as Chaura or Sundara). The introduction section of these manuscripts narrates the poet's love story that allegedly led to the poem's composition. The title Chaura-Panchashika has been used for different poems that have only five verses in common. All these poems feature fifty verses in the vasanta-tilaka meter, each of which begins with the words "even now" (adyāpi), and features the speaker remembering his beloved. Depending on their location of composition, the various manuscripts can be divided into two categories: the Northern recensions and the Western-Southern recensions. It is possible that the five common verses were part of an original poem that inspired the different recensions.

The attribution of Chaura-Panchashika to Bilhana is doubtful, because Abhinavagupta quotes some verses from this text in his Abhinava-bharatu, a century before Bilhana. Moreover, the Northern recension manuscripts generally place the love story in Gujarat. However, the Shringara-Prakasha attributed to Bhoja (who died before Bilhana's arrival in Gujarat) quotes two verses from the Chaura-Panchashika.

The Northern recension manuscripts typically narrate the following story: King Vairi-simha (or Vīrasiṃha) of Patana appoints Bilhana as a teacher for his daughter Shashikala. Bilhana is a handsome young man, and Shashikala falls in love with him during a lesson on erotology (kāmaśāstra). Bilhana believes that the princess was his wife in a previous birth, and the couple has a secret gandharva marriage. Ultimately, the royal servants become aware of the relationship, and inform the king. The king becomes angry, and banishes Bilhana. When Bilhana continues to send love-poems to the princess through messengers, the king orders him to be impaled to death. When Bilhana is about to be executed, the king asks him to remember his favourite deity, but Bilhana replies that he cannot remember anyone except Shasikla. He then recites 50 verses describing his love for Shasikala, which according to the legend, constitute the Chaura-Panchashika. Several manuscripts do not state whether Bilhana was killed or not, but in the texts Bilhaniya Kavya and Bilhaniya Charita, the king realizes that Bilhana sincerely loves Shashikala, and orders him to be released. The king allows the couple to remain together, and gives Bilhana wealth, villages elephants and horses.

The Western-Southern recension manuscripts, such as the Rahasya Sandarbha, typically narrate a similar story with different names: king Madanabhirama is the ruler of the Lakshmi-mandira city in the Panchala country. He appoints Bilhana, the best poet and scholar of his time, as a teacher for his daughter Yamini-purna-tialaka. Aware that Bilhana is a young and handsome man, the king devises a plan to prevent the princess from falling in love with him. He tells Bilhana that the princess suffers from leprosy, tells the princess that Bilhana is blind, and orders a curtain to be placed between the two during the lessons. One evening, Bilhana recites a verse about the beautiful full moon, and the princess realizes that he is not blind. She removes the curtain, and the two fall in love. When the king becomes aware of their affair, he orders Bilhana to be killed. Facing death, Bilhana recites the poem, recalling his time with the princess. The king is impressed, pardons Bilhana, and allows him to marry the princess.

The actual Chaura-Panchashika verses do not refer to this love story, and modern scholars have rejected it as inauthentic. No king named Vairi-simha is known to have existed in Gujarat at Bilhana's time.

The love story has inspired two 1948 Tamil-language movies, including Bilhana and Bilhanan.
