= Rājamṛgāṅka =

Rājamṛgāṅka may refer to

- Rājamṛgāṅka (astronomy book), a Sanskrit treatise devoted to astronomical computations
- Rājamṛgāṅka (Ayurveda book), a Sanskrit book dealing with preparation of Āyurvedic medicines
