= Abhimāna =

Hindu philosophy

Abhimāna (Sanskrit:अभिमान) variously means – pride, false prestige, desire, an impression, the conception, by self-conception, from the misconception; in Hindu philosophy, it means – prideful attachment of "I-sense" i.e. man (to think) + māna (too much); it also means – identify or identification and also refers to selfish conviction, for abhimāna is the function of ahamkara (ego) as the state of mind which interprets experience as " mine ".

The psychological sense of "I" am experience is ahamkāra which comes about as and when owing to avidya , Brahman, the Universal transcendental Self, is distinguished from the Jiva, the empirical individual self. Sanga (one's associations), mamkāra (attachments) and moha (attractions) are the three aspects of abhimāna (ego-consciousness) which produces katrtva (the sense agency) as the deliberate consciousness of niścaya (decision) without which there would be no difference between the self and other material objects; buddhi (intellect), which manifests according to vāsanās (impressions), is deliberate decision.

अन्तःकरणमेतेषु चक्षुरादिषु वर्ष्मणि |
अहमित्यभिमानेन तिष्ठत्याभासतेजसा ||

"The antahkarana (internal organ, the mind) has its seat in these, the eye and other organs of the body identifying itself with them with the sense of "I" by reflection of the ātman in it."

— Vivekachudamani, 105

Shankara tells us that the mind or manas dwells in the organs and body as aham (ego) with abhimāna – अहमित्यभिमानेन in the reflected brightness of the atman as the kartā (doer) and the bhoktā (enjoyer) experiencing all three states of consciousness but the atman, the witness of everything, limited by buddhi is not tainted by anything that buddhi does – अशेषसाक्षी for the taint of action attaches only to the actor, the ātman does not act. This abhimāna or identification with names and forms dependent on the perishable body, as also with the subtle body, needs to be given up entirely in order to realize akhanda ānanda (inseparable bliss). Vācaspati Miśra explains that it is ahamkāra (empirical ego) which presides over the objects intuited by the sense-organs and then definitely perceived by the mind; and that the sense-organ intuits the object, manas reflects on it, ahamkāra appropriates it and finally buddhi (intellect) resolves which way the intended action must proceed.

Abhimāna is the false sense of "I" and "mine"; it is because of the emphatic identity (abhimāna) with one's body etc., that there is pramata (cognising subject) and involvement with pramānas (acts or processes of knowing, perception, inference and the rest) owing to functioning of the senses as resulting from avidyā (ignorance) and resulting in bondage. Examined from the level of social consciousness, ātman or the transcendental consciousness is certainly essential for man's being but upadhis (limitations) are its accidental parts the self-identification with which gives rise to abhimāna (identification with the body) that makes man a socio-spiritual being subjective and objective, both, and becomes the basis for his adhikāra (social and ritual eligibility). According to the Shudha Advaita school of Vallabha Acharya, saguna means – one having the abhimāna of gunas (forming part of one's own self), the nirguna is one having no abhimāna.

The Lakshmi Tantra tells us that "ahamkāra which is a cognitive-sense, is identical with abhimāna" and "the awareness of the knower in relating time and place to himself is called abhimāna". For most people desiring success, incidental gains and weighed down by sense of self-respect abhimāna is a virtue but for those who are wise and contented, it is mere pride associated with arrogance. Bhoja, who outlined the theory of Rasa (experience of delight), attaches great importance to abhimāna or ahankāra (ego). He states that the rasika who has rasa in him has it because of sringara (peak), ahamkāra and abhimāna, enjoyable as a guna of his atman; he uses the term abhimāna in a good sense. From ahamkāra rises abhimāna that originates sringāra, and from abhimāna rises rati (love, amorousness), and from rati are originated all rasas.
