= Bilhana (film) =

1948 film by B. N. Rao

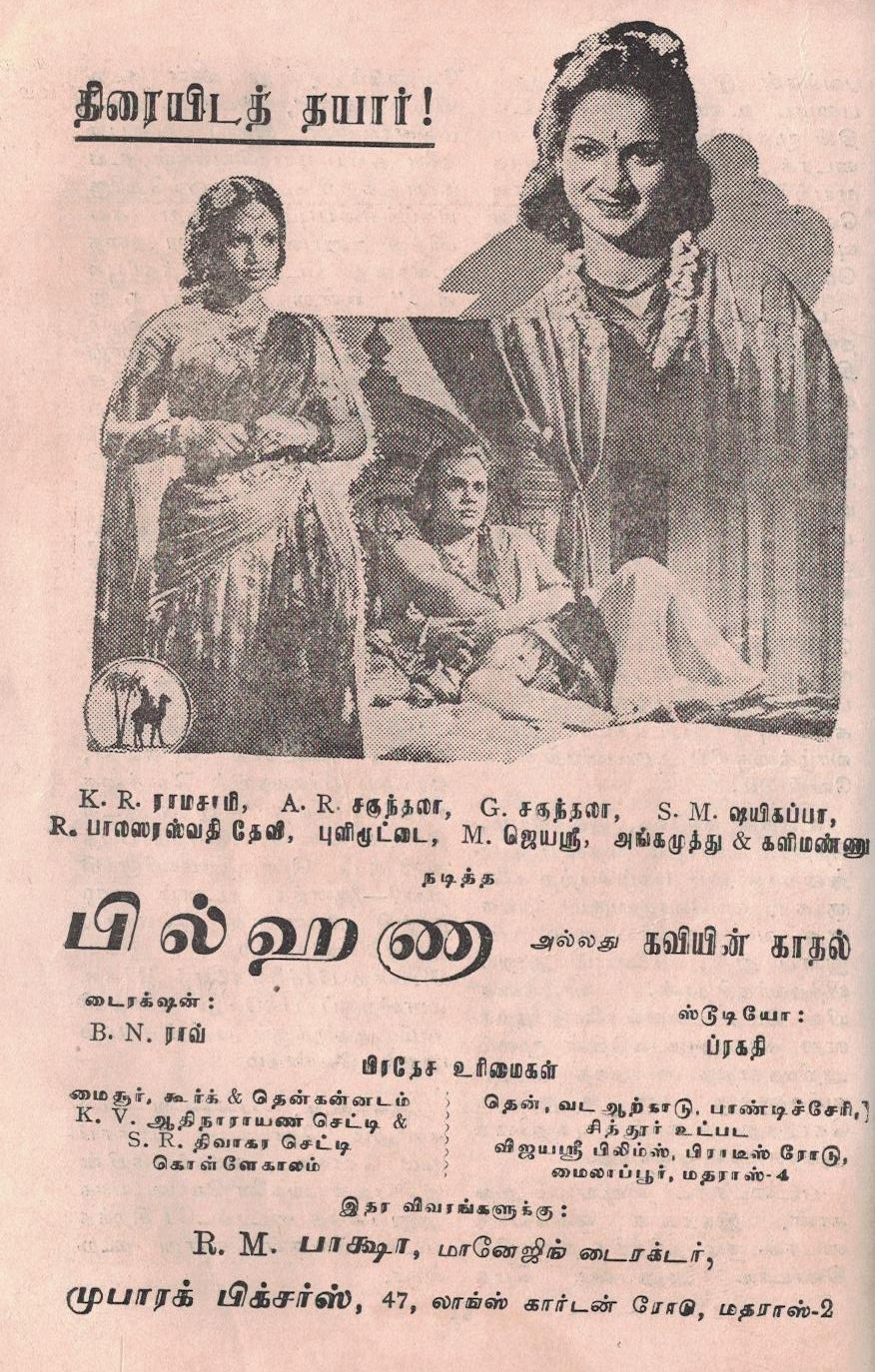
- Poster
- Directed by: B. N. Rao
- Screenplay by: S. Sundarachariar
- Starring: K. R. Ramasamy; A. R. Sakunthala
- Music by: Papanasam Sivan
- Production company: Mubarak Pictures
- Release date: 1 November 1948
- Country: India
- Language: Tamil

Bilhana is a 1948 Indian Tamil-language historical romance film directed by B. N. Rao and produced by Mubarak Pictures. Based on the life of the Kashmiri poet of the same name, the film stars K. R. Ramasamy and A. R. Sakunthala. It was released on 1 November 1948.

== Plot ==
A king hires the poet Bilhana to educate his daughter, Yamini. To prevent having a romance developing between them, the king lies to Yamini that Bilhana is blind, and to Bilhana that Yamini is deformed. When they are to interact, he arranges a curtain between the two. One day, during a lesson, Bilhana is amused at the sight of the full moon in the sky. To express his feeling of rapture, he starts reciting a poem. At this, Yamini begins wondering how a blind man could sing about the beauty of the moon so well. She pulls down the curtain and finds that Bilhana is attractive and youthful. At the same time, Bilhana learns that Yamini is beautiful and not disfigured. The two fall in love, and decide to marry, much to the anger of the king, who sentences them both to death. When the king's friends and other people revolt against his decision, he yields, and the two lovers marry.

== Production ==
In 1944, T. R. Sundaram of Modern Theatres announced his intention to direct a film adaptation of the story of the Kashmiri poet Bilhana, to star M. K. Thyagaraja Bhagavathar. However, the film was shelved due to Bhagavathar's arrest as a suspect in the Lakshmikanthan murder case. Later, the TKS Brothers adapted the story of Bilhana twice. The first instance was for a stage performance and the second was for the screen, in April 1948 under the title Bilhanan. Since the story was not protected by copyright, Mubarak Pictures could produce their own adaptation, with the title Bilhana. This version was directed by B. N. Rao and scripted by S. Sundarachariar, with music by Papanasam Sivan. The film featured K. R. Ramasamy as the title character and A. R. Sakunthala as Yamini. Supporting roles were played by G. Sakunthala, S. M. Shaikappa, R. Balasaraswathi Devi, Pulimootai Ramasami, M. Jayasree, M. Jaya, Angamuthu and Kalimannu.

== Release and reception ==
Bilhana was released on 1 November 1948. According to film historian Randor Guy, it was not very successful, because the earlier film by the TKS Brothers was "still green in the minds of moviegoers". However, he did say that the Mubarak Pictures' version would be remembered for "the interesting storyline, singing of Ramasami and deft direction of B.N. Rao."
