= Rājamṛgāṅka (Ayurveda book) =

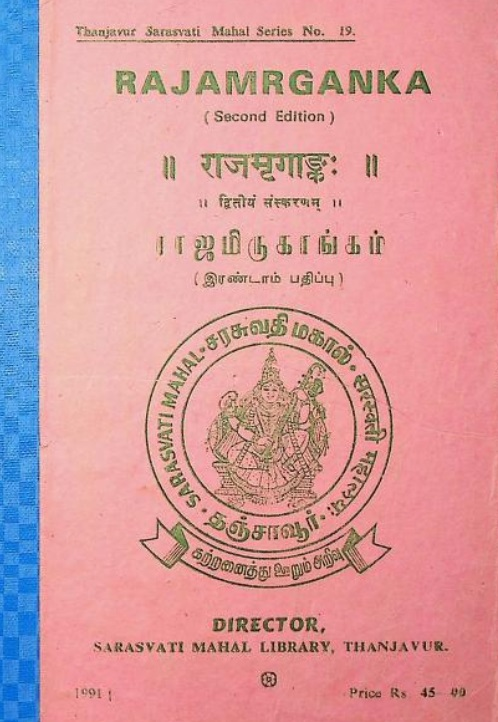
Cover page of Tamil translation of Rajamriganka (Internet Archive))

Rājamṛgāṅka is the title of a Sanskrit-language treatise that deals with the preparation of Āyurvedic medicines. Traditionally, the authorship of the treatise is attributed to the Paramara king Bhoja (r.c. 1010-1055) who ruled the Malwa region in west-central India. However, modern scholarship attributes the authorship to an anonymous experienced Ayurvedic physician from South India.

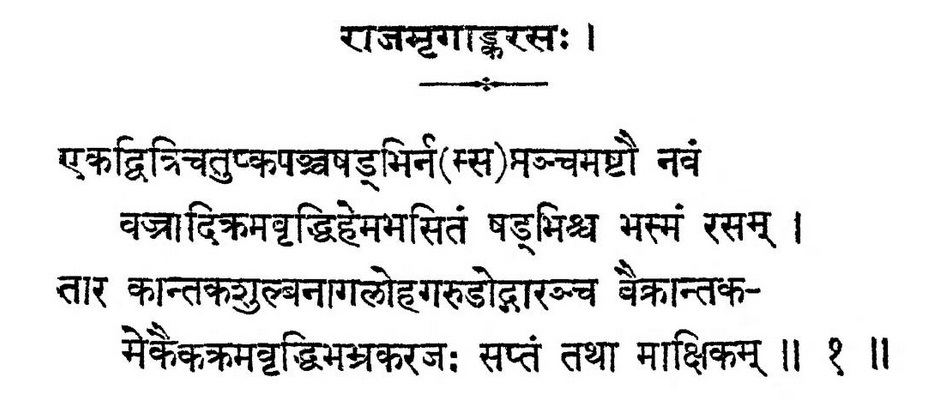
The formulation of the Ayurvedic medicine Rajamrgankarasa as given in the Ayurvedic treatise Rājamṛgāṅka (Internet Archive)

There is a tradition according to which the author of the Āyurveda text Rājamṛgāṅka is King Bhoja. King Bhoja is also reputed to be the author of another treatise on Āyurveda titled Rājamārtāṇḍa. According to the V. B. Nataraja Sastry, who critically edited Rājamṛgāṅka before its publication by T.M.S.S.M. Library, the author of Rājamṛgāṅka was most probably an Āyurvedic physician from south India. It is highly likely that this physician may have been a member of a group of physicians gathered together by the King of Tanjore Rajah Serfoji for research on medical sciences.

The treatise gives detailed descriptions of as many as 137 Āyurvedic medicinal formulations of which eight are in the form of rasa-s and the remaining are in the form of cūrṇa-s (powder). The first formulation has been called Rājamṛgāṅkarasaḥ whence the title of the treatise.
