= Samadhishvara Temple, Chittorgarh =

11th century Shiva temple in Chittor Fort of India

Samadhishvara Temple
- समाधीश्वर
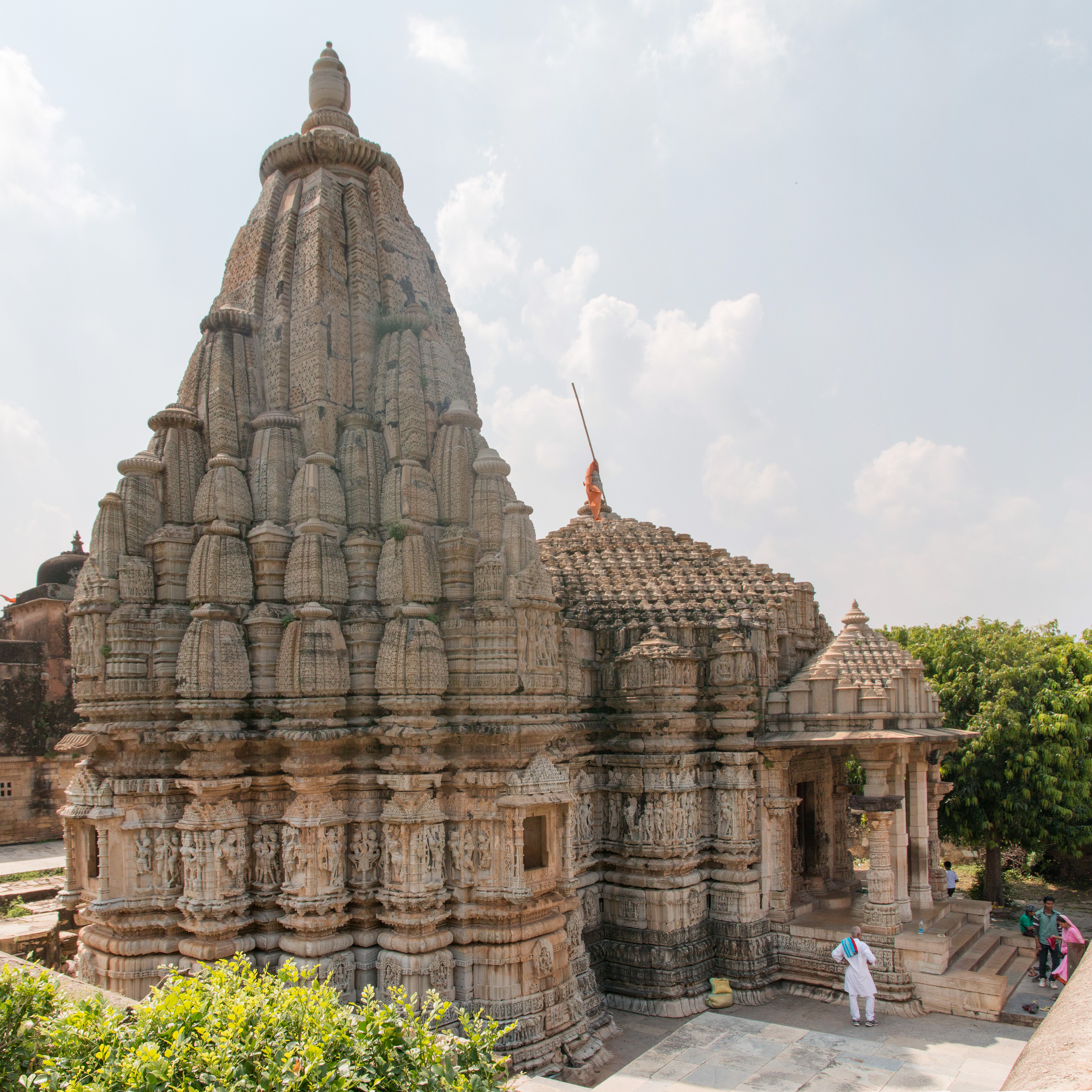

- Location in India

Religion
- Affiliation: Hinduism
- District: Chittorgarh
- Deity: Shiva
- Governing body: Archaeological Survey of India (ASI)

Location
- Location: Chittor Fort
- State: Rajasthan
- Country: India
- Interactive map of Samadhishvara Temple
- Coordinates: 24.8873°N 74.6445°E

Architecture
- Established: 11th century

The Samadhishvara Temple (IAST: Samādhīśvara) is a Hindu temple located in the Chittor Fort in Rajasthan, India. It is dedicated to Shiva, who is called "Samadhishvara", that is, "Lord of Samadhi". Epigraphic evidence suggests that the temple was constructed in the 11th century, and was further restored in the 13th and the 15th centuries.

== Etymology and names ==
Samadhishvara ("Lord of Samadhi") is an aspect of the Hindu god Shiva. The temple is also known as "Samadhishwar" in Hindi, because of schwa deletion. It is sometimes erroneously called Samiddheshvara (IAST: Sammidheśvara), but multiple historical records establish that Samadhishvara (also known as Samadhisha) is the correct name of the temple's deity.

In modern times, the temple's deity is also known as "Adbhut-ji" or "Adbad-ji", a name also used for the deity of a 15th-century Shiva temple near Surajpole. The name "Adbhut-ji" seems to be a local name for the three-faced aspect of Shiva; both the temples contain a three-faced idol of Shiva.

== History ==
=== Origins ===
One theory identifies Samadhishvara temple as the Tri-bhuvana Narayana or Bhoja-svamin temple referred to in historical records. According to the 1273 CE Chirawa inscription, Madana, an official who bore the designation talaraksha, used to worship Shiva at the Tri-bhuvana Narayana temple constructed by Bhoja in Chittor. This temple was also known as the Bhoja-svamin-jagati, as attested by a 1301 CE inscription. The 11th century Paramara king Bhoja is referred to by the epithet "Tri-loka-Narayana" ("Lord of the three worlds") in the 12th century Sanskrit text Gana-Ratna-Mahodadhi. Because "Tri-bhuvana" and "Tri-loka" are synonyms (both meaning "three worlds"), historian G. H. Ojha theorized that the Tri-bhuvana Narayana temple at Chittor was built by the Paramara king Bhoja. Ojha further identified this temple as the present-day Samadhishvara temple.

Ram Vallabh Somani, a scholar who wrote on history of Mewar under the patronage of the descendants of the Sisodia royal family, disputes Ojha's identification. Based on a 984 CE (1041 VS) pillar inscription, Somani concludes that the Samadhishvara temple pre-dates Bhoja, and was built in the 10th century. Somani theorizes that the Tri-bhuvana Narayana temple referred to in the historical records was a different temple, which may have been destroyed during the Khalji conquest of Chittor in 1303.

Art historian R. Nath disputes Somani's theory, pointing out that the alleged 984 CE pillar inscription is not available to any scholar except Somani, whose research contains several errors. Somani has not made available the original inscription or its full text, citing "administrative reasons", which Nath dismisses as a flimsy excuse. According to Nath, Somani's reading of the year could be wrong: the veracity of Somani's other writings on the inscriptions of Rajasthan has often been questioned by other scholars, including historian Dasharatha Sharma.

Nath supports Ojha's identification, based on two historical prashastis (eulogistic inscriptions) composed by Veda Sharman:

- A 1274 CE stone slab inscription at Chittor records the restoration of Gaumukha Tirthasthala area (in which the temple is located) by the Guhila king Samarasimha. A verse in this inscription invokes Shiva as Samadhishvara, and also refers to a second slab which is now lost.
- A 1285 CE stone slab inscription discovered in a Shaivite matha at the Achaleshwar temple of Abu records that the previous prashasti composed by Veda Sharman at Chittor was related to two famous temples: one of Samadhisha (that is, Samadhishvara), which was famous as Tri-bhuvana; and the other of Chakrasvamin (an aspect of Vishnu).

According to the Chirawa inscription, Madana used to worship the Sadashiva aspect of Shiva at the temple: the Sadashiva is depicted as having five faces and ten hands. However, the main idol of Shiva at the Samadhishvara temple has only three faces and six hands. Nath explains this discrepancy by theorizing that the original idol of the temple was destroyed during the Khalji conquest, and was later restored by the 15th century king Mokala-simha. The current idol is a relatively modern one, and post-dates Mokala-simha.

=== Jain imagery ===
A 1150 CE Sanskrit prashasti inscription discovered at the Samadhishvara temple records the visit of the Chaulukya king Kumarapala to the temple, which it calls "Samadhisha-Maheshvara". It states that Kumarapala worshipped the temple's deity and his consort (that is, Shiva and Parvati), and made donations to the temple. Interestingly, the prashasti was composed by a Digambara Jain monk. Based on this, and the fact that Kumarapala patronized Jainism, art historian M. A. Dhaky theorized that the Samadhishvara temple was originally a Jain shrine. In his support, Dhaky also cited the presence of several images of Jain tirthankaras and yaksha-yakshinis in the temple.

R. Nath disputes this theory, pointing out that the inscription clearly states that Kumarapala worshipped Shiva and Parvati during his visit to the temple. Moreover, according to the Moha-Parajaya-Nataka composed by Kumarapala's minister Yashahpala, the king converted to Jainism only at a later date, in 1159 CE. Nath explains that the Jain imagery does not have any religious connotation: it is one of the several scenes depicting life of the general public of Chittor, which included the Jains. He points out that other motifs at the temple depict women in erotic postures, battles, and hunting: these are not inline with the non-violence and celibacy themes of the Jain monasticism. In addition, he cites the 12th century CE text Aparajitaprccha, which recommends that the Jain icons should be depicted on the jamgha (middle wall) of a temple along with Shaivite and Vaishnavite icons.

=== Restorations ===
The temple has been restored several times. Based on the 1150 CE inscription which records the visit of and donations by the Chaulukya king Kumarapala to the temple, R. Nath theorizes that Kumarapala restored the temple, which may explain some Gujarati influence on the art and architecture of the temple.

As mentioned above, according to a 1274 CE stone slab inscription, the area around the temple was restored by the Guhila king Samarasimha (also known as Rawal Samar Singh). This is further corroborated by the 1285 CE Achaleshwar inscription.

A 1428 CE black marble slab inscription discovered at the temple records its restoration by king Mokala-simha (also known as Rana Mokal Singh). It uses the words "Samadhisha" and "Samadhishvara" to describe the temple's deity. The 1460 Kumbhalgarh prashasti inscription also refers to Mokala's restoration of the temple.

The temple is also referred to in the 1460 CE Kirtti-stambha prashasti inscription. Two short inscriptions, dated 1442 CE and 1458 CE, record architects paying obeisance to Samadhishvara.

Since 1956, the temple has been administered by the Government of India's Archaeological Survey of India.

== Architecture ==
The temple is located within the Chittor Fort, at the Gaumukha Tirthasthala, on the northern bank of the Gaumukh Kund reservoir. Since it was built and restored over a period of five centuries (11th-15th century), it features several sculptural styles.

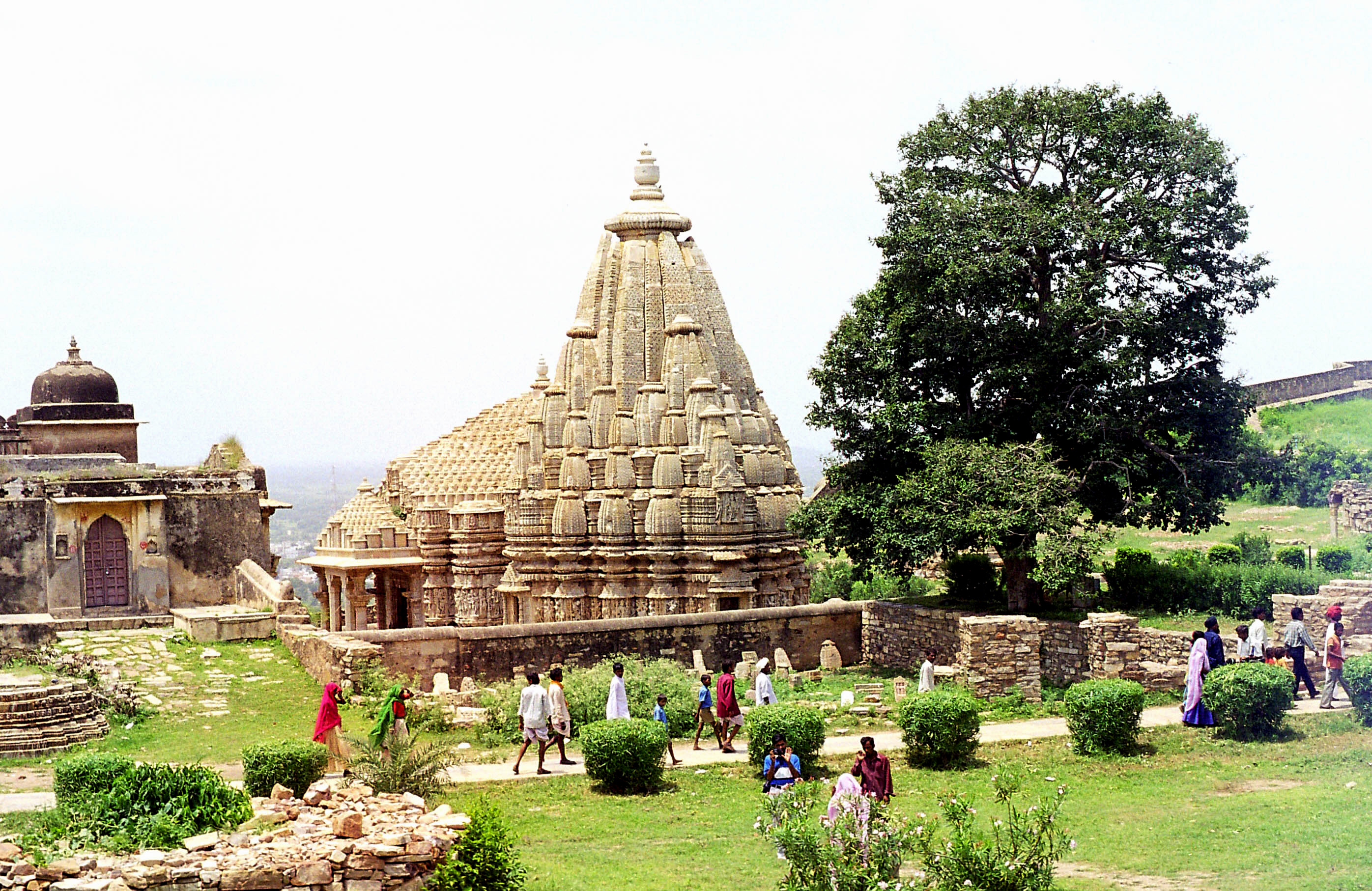
The temple from a distance

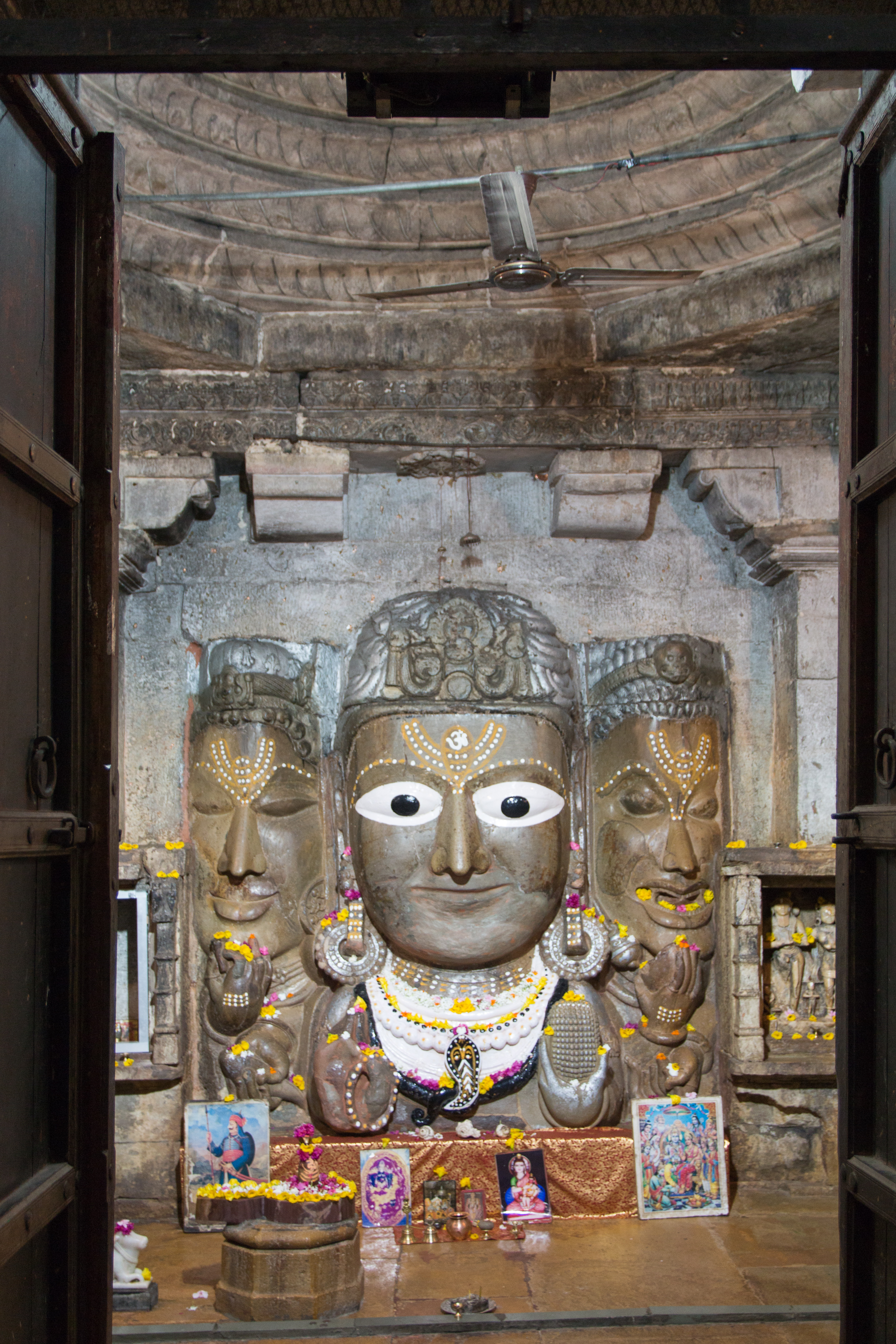
Three-faced Shiva

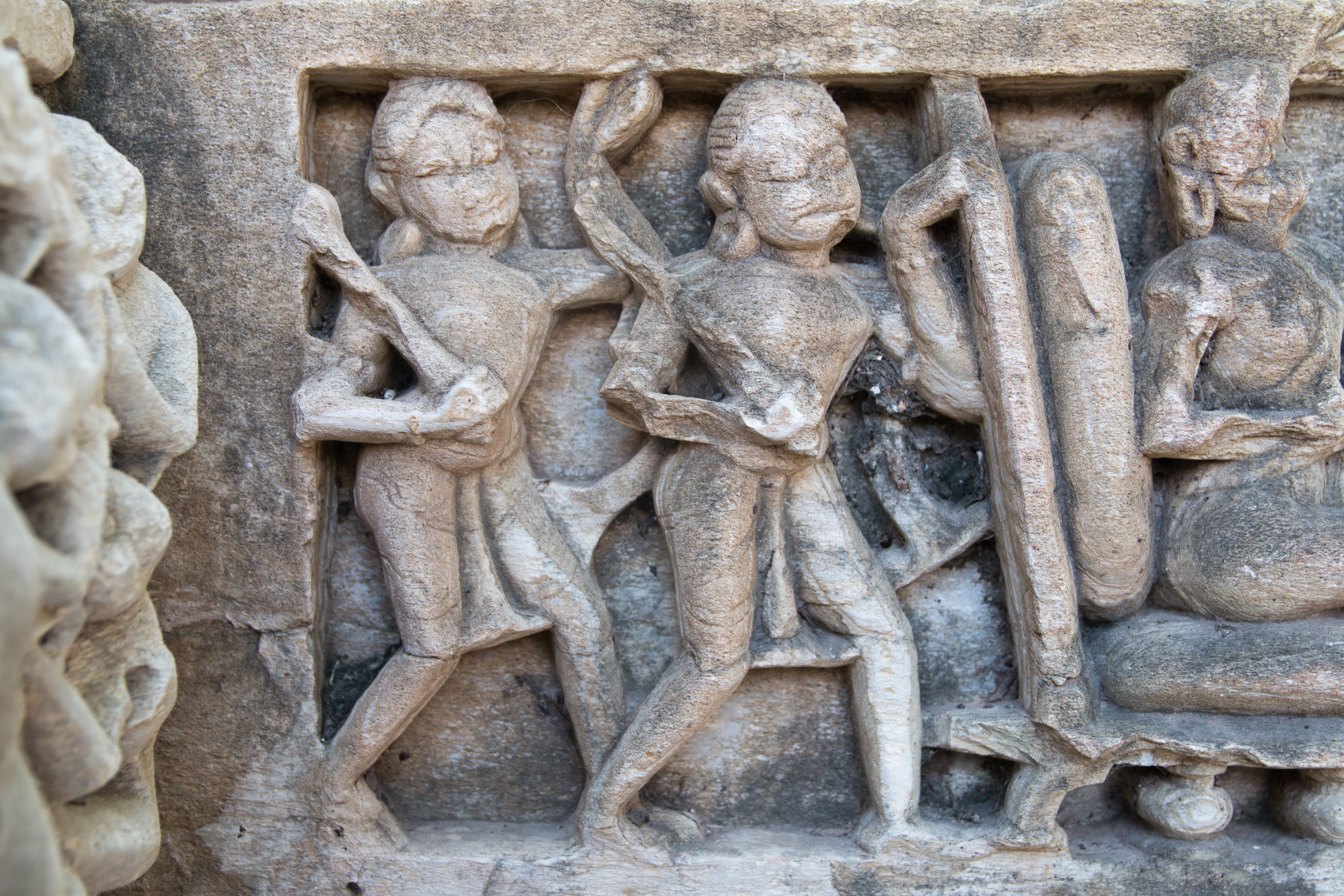
Depiction of a sati procession

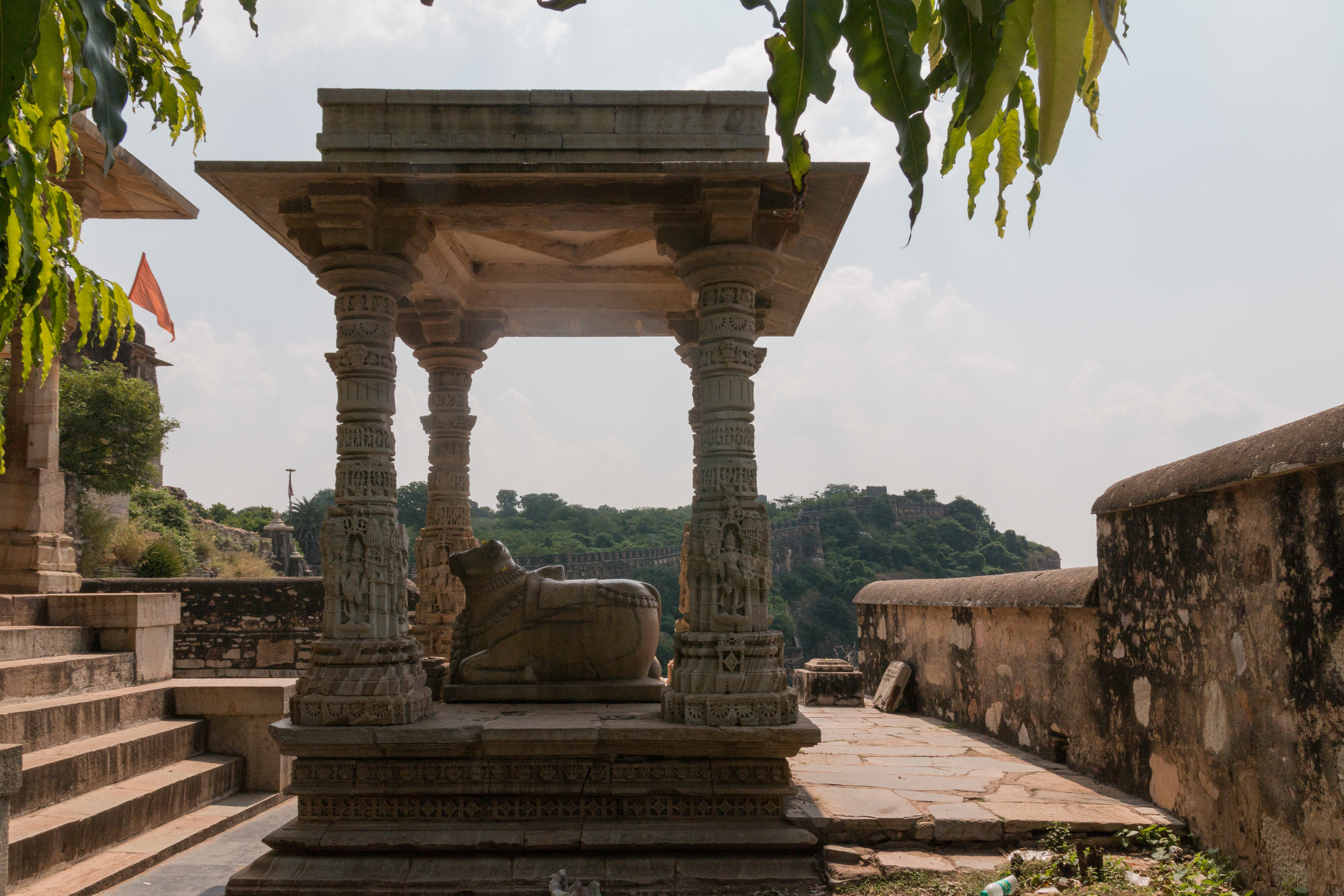
Pavilion of Nandi (bull)

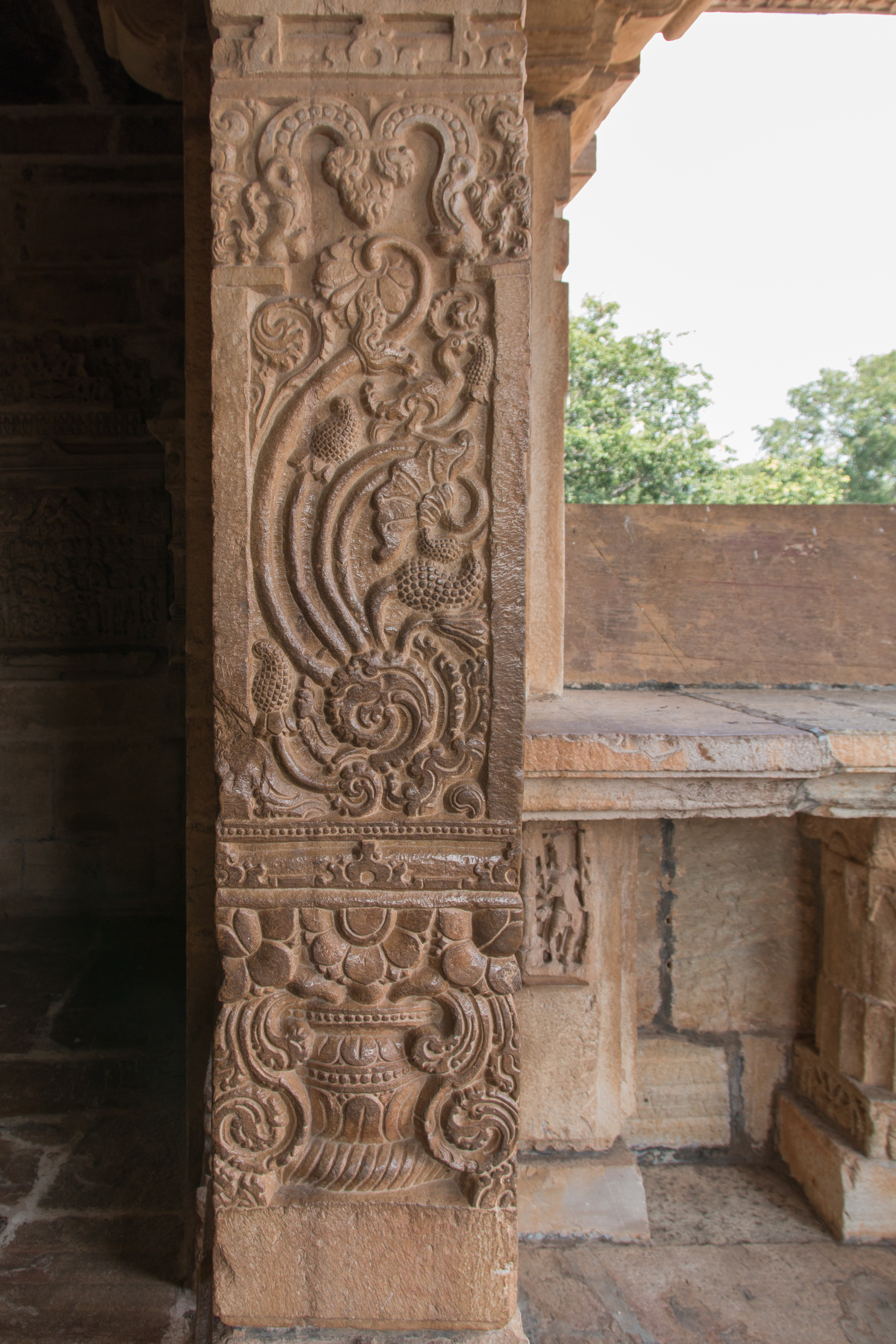
An ornate pillar

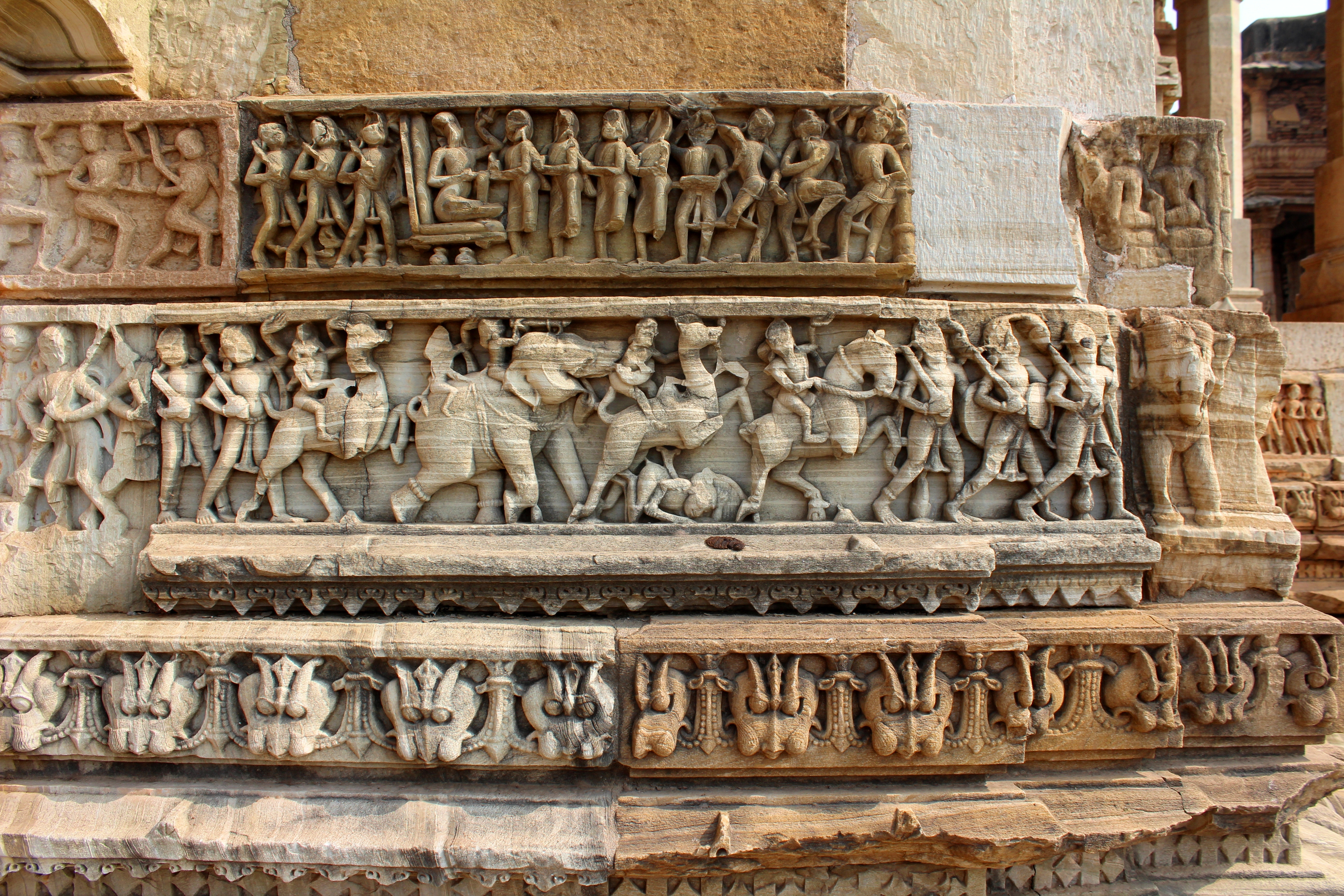
Sculptures

The building comprises a sanctum (garbhagriha) located in the east, an antechamber (antarala), and an entrance hall (gudha-mandapa). It has three entrance porches (mukha-chatushki), on its northern, western, and southern sides. The sanctum is located at a lower level than the general floor level of the temple, with six stairs descending from the antechamber to the sanctum.

The sanctum contains an image of Shiva, which R. Nath describes as a work of poor quality from artistic point of view. The image depicts Shiva as having three heads, all of which are shown wearing jata-mukutas (crowns of dreadlocks). Each of the three faces has a third eye; the right face bears a terrifying expression, while the centre and the left faces bear a peaceful expression. The right head shows the Aghora aspect of Shiva, it features a ringlet of snakes and a skull on the jata-mukuta. Shiva's body is shown having six hands: one hand is raised in the sarpa-mudra (snake gesture); other hands bear objects such as akshamala (rosary), citron (matulunga), skull-cup (kapala), and snake (sarpa).

The nara-thara (raised platform depicting humans) of the temple features several scenes from public life:

- Hunting, a historically popular pastime
- Battles
- Royal processions and courts
- Religious themes, including worship of stupas, lingas, jinas, and other deities; religious discourses; and ascetics
- Devanganas (celestial women) in dancing and erotic postures
- Other scenes from common life, such as bullock-carts, camel-carts, and artisans at work
