= Khonmoh =

- census town
- Location in Jammu and Kashmir, India Khonmoh (India)
- Coordinates: 34.0588°N 74.9492°E
- Country: India
- State: Jammu and Kashmir
- District: Srinagar
- Tehsil: Pantha-chowk

Government
  - Body: Panchayat

Area
  - Total: 1.98 km^{2} (0.76 sq mi)

Population (2011)
  - Total: 2,664
  - Density: 1,350/km^{2} (3,480/sq mi)
- Time zone: UTC+5:30 (IST)
- Pincode: 191101

Khonmoh, also known as Khanmo, (Note: Other transliterations include Khunmuh, Khunmoh and Khonamoh.) is a village in the Srinagar district of Jammu and Kashmir, India. It is the birth place of the 11th-century Sanskrit poet Bilhana.

== History ==
Khonmoh was historically known as Khonmusha (IAST: Khonamuṣa). (Note: Other transliterations include Khonamukha, Khunamusha (IAST: Khunamuṣa), and Khonamusha.) According to the 12th century text Rajatarangini by Kalhana, king Khagendra had established Khonmusha as an agrahara (land granted to Brahmins). It was located near the village of Jaya-vana (modern Jaivan), the site of a Buddhist chaitya.

The Vikramanka-deva-charita of the 11th-century Sanskrit-language poet Bilhana states that he was born in the Khonmusha village. Bilhana describes it as a peaceful settlement with pious people, with several sites for ritual sacrifices. According to Bilhana, this was the place where the "marvellous tales, fables and folk-tales" (presumably the Brihatkatha stories) originated.

== Administration ==
Khonmoh is the headquarters of the Khonmoh block, a sub-division of the Srinagar district. The Khonmoh block includes the following panchayats: Balhama A, Khonmoh A, Khonmoh B, and Khonmoh C.

Khonmoh is also the headquarters of the Khonmoh niabat, an administrative and revenue division under the Pantha-chowk tehsil of the Srinagar district. The following administrative units, called Patwar Halqas, are part of the Khonmoh niabat:

Patwar Halqa	Villages
Khonmoh	Khonmoh
Balhama	Balhama
Zawoora	Zawoora, Ich Nambal
Zewan	Zewan
Panthachowk	Panthachowk, Sempora
Lasjan	Lasjan, Soitengo
Pandrethan	Pandrethan, Badamibagh

== Demographics ==
The 2011 census of India designates Khonmoh as a census town (CT). According to the census, Khonmoh has 216 households with 2,664 people, including 2,017 men and 647 women. The effective literacy rate (the percentage of literate persons among the population aged 7 years and above) was 80.71%. The population included 39 Scheduled Caste (SC) persons and 12 Scheduled Tribe (ST) persons.
