= Lalbhai Dalpatbhai Museum =

- Location within Ahmedabad Location within Gujarat
- Established: 1984
- Location: Opposite Gujarat University, Navarangpura, Ahmedabad, India 380009
- Coordinates: 23.033166°N 72.549895°E
- Type: Museum
- Director: Sujata Parsai
- Curators: Sunanda V. Sudhakar, Priyanka Kundu
- Website: www.ldmuseum.co.in

Lalbhai Dalpatbhai Museum, abbreviated L. D. Museum, is a museum of Indian sculptures, bronzes, manuscripts, paintings, drawings, miniature paintings, woodwork, bead work and ancient and contemporary coins in Ahmedabad, Gujarat, India.

== History ==
In 1956, the Lalbhai Dalpatbhai Institute of Indology was founded by the Ahmedabad-based industrialist Kasturbhai Lalbhai and Jain Acharya Muni Punyavijayji. Muni Punyavijayji donated his collection of manuscripts and paintings for the institute's founding collection. As the collection was enlarged over the years, a need was feld for a separate museum building to house the display of institute's collection. Consequently, a new museum building was built adjacent to the existing building of the institute, which was designed by notable architect Balkrishna Doshi. The collection in the new museum building was opened to the public in 1984 and was formally inaugurated by Braj Kumar Nehru (then-Governor of Gujarat) in 1985.

== Location ==
The Lalbhai Dalpatbhai Museum of the Lalbhai Dalpatbhai Bharatiya Sanskriti Vidya Mandir is located in the premises of the L.D. Institute of Indology, Ahmedabad. It is situated on a sprawling campus in the western part of the city in an area dotted with educational and research institutes, and in the vicinity of Gujarat University and L.D. College of Engineering.

It is about 7 kilometers from the Railway Station and 12 kilometers from the Airport. Therefore, it is easily accessible from any part of the Ahmedabad city.

== Timings ==
The museum is open on all days, except on Mondays and public holidays, from 10:30 a.m. to 5:30 p.m.

== Collections ==
Head of Boddhisatva Maitreya, late 2nd century

The wide-ranging sculpture collection is unique, since all the major regional styles of the sub-continent are represented here on the Ground Floor, in Madhuri D. Desai Gallery. The outstanding pieces include the largest head of Buddha (c. 5th century) in stucco from Gandhara, the earliest cult image of Lord Rama (early 6th century) Gupta period from Deogarh (Madhya Pradesh), a rare figure of Matrika Indrani (6th century) from Shamlaji (Gujarat), the Adinath bronze image (c.7th-8th century) from Sirpur (near Nandurbar, Maharashtra), the Jaina bronze images from Ghogha (Dist.Bhavnagar, Gujarat) and some of the finest examples of Buddha images from Mathura, Nalanda and Nepal/ Tibet. Besides, the Madhuri D. Desai Gallery includes some very superb Chola sculptures (c. 10th-12th century) from Tamil Nadu. A majestic group of four Tirthankaras from Ladol dating between 11th and 13th centuries are displayed in Chaumukha arrangement. There are also in display 9 portrait statues of distinguished personages from Gujarat during the medieval period, which includes the Solanki king, Jayasimha Siddharaja. The portraits are inscribed with the date of V.S.1285 = 1228 (that is, during the Vaghela period) and the find spot is Harij, near Patan.

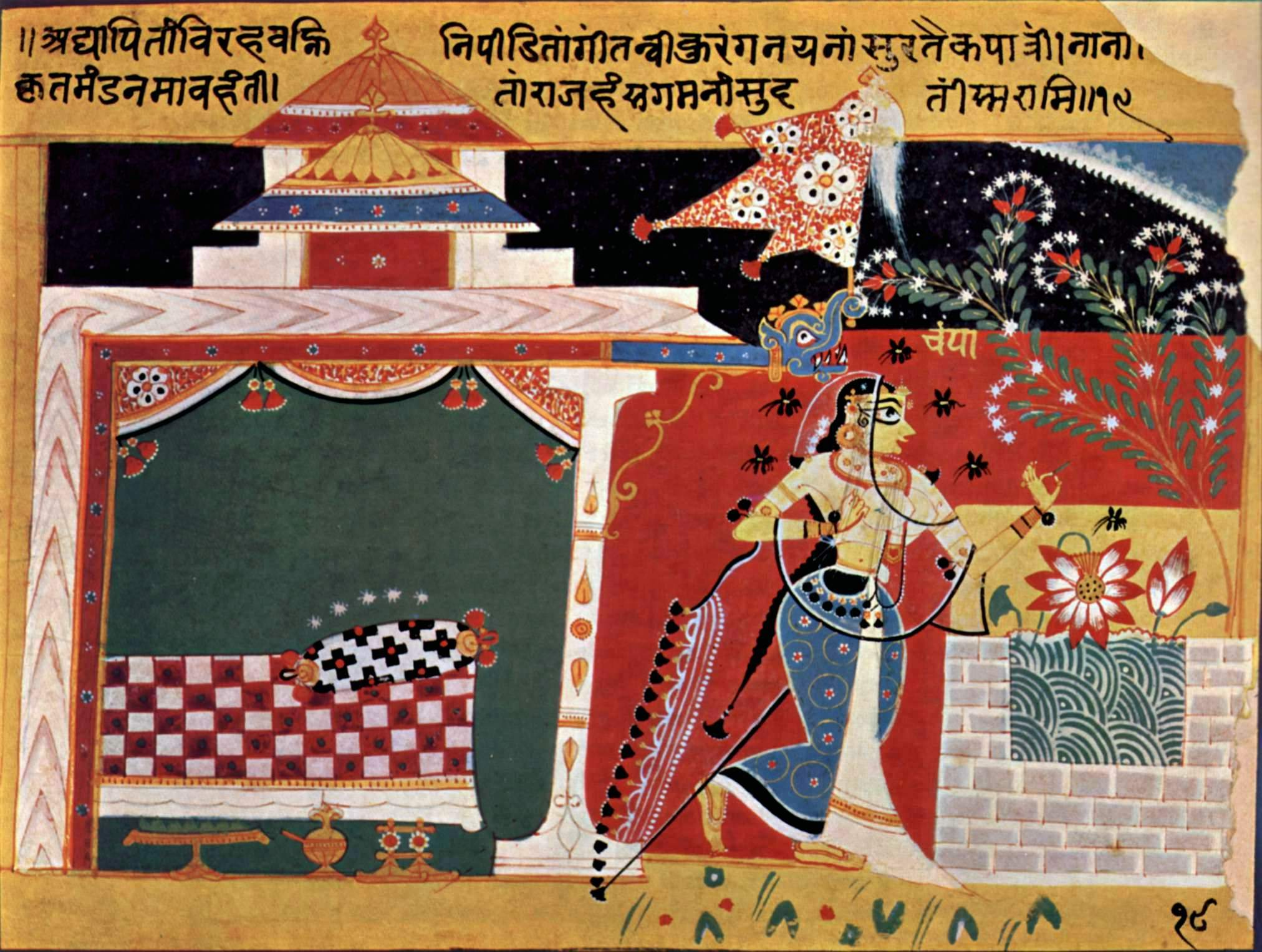
"Champavati by a Lotus Pond", folio from a Caurīsuratapañcāśikā manuscript. Second quarter of the 16th century

The museum has one of the finest collections of paintings in the Gujarati Jaina styles, some of which are painted before the Mughal period and are displayed in the Muni Punyavijayaji Gallery on the 1st Floor. The collection, which was assembled by the Muniji during the 1940s, has some rare illustrated wooden book covers (patli) created for palm-leaf manuscripts. The Jaina pilgrimage painting on cloth executed in 1433 at Champaner (Gujarat) is the earliest extant example of such a painting on cloth. Similarly, a Vijnaptipatra painted at Agra by the Mughal painter, Ustad Salivahana, in 1610, is the earliest painted document of its kind. It refers to the Mughal emperor Jahangir's farman prohibiting the killing of animals in his empire during the Jaina festival of Paryushana. The earliest painted paper manuscript of the Shantinath Charitra, dated V.S.1453 = 1396. has been recognized as a global treasure by UNESCO. Other exceptional examples on show include, the illustrated manuscripts of the Kalakacharya Katha (c. 1430) in Mandu style, the Matar Sangrahani Sutra (dated 1583), painted by Chitara Govinda, the Shripala Rasa (18th century), and painted Vijnapatipatra from Ahmedabad (dated 1796) in the late Gujarati style; several rare cosmological diagrams called Adhidvipa (c. 1440) and the Jaina Siddha-Chakra-Yantra.

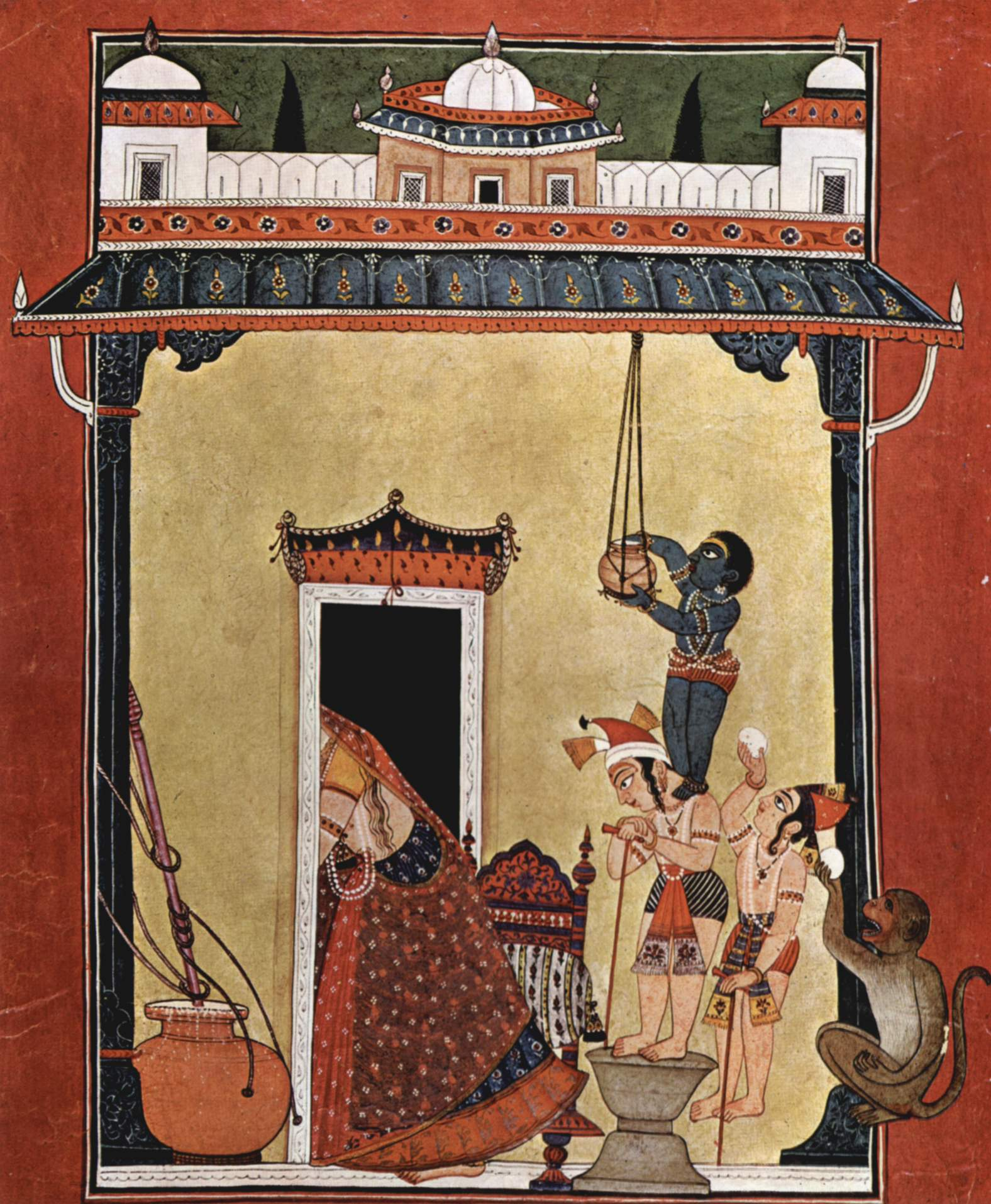
Krishna steals milk, c. 1750

On the 1st floor, eastern wing of the Muni Punyavijayaji Gallery has been designed with a section displaying the Leelavati Lalbhai Wood work Collection. It highlights the age old tradition of wood carving in Gujarat and other parts of India, mostly donated by Smt. Leelavati Lalbhai. The display includes Jaina Derasara, relief panels of Tirthankaras and other symbolic forms, carved pillars and decorative panels.

Among the noteworthy objects on display from the Shri Arvindbhai Collection, are a flamboyant Chola style Nataraja (11th century), an exuberant Nepali/ Tibetan bronze Mandala (18th century) and an elaborately decorated Chinese/ Japanese style cupboard in wood. This gift has widened the scope of the various collections to grow into a Museum of Asian Art in the Gujarat region.

Kasturbhai Lalbhai Collection of Indian Drawings comprises over 1855 Indian drawings and unfinished paintings. They represent most of the schools of Indian miniature paintings. Initially the collection was formed nearly 1000 years ago and now it is on display with the same objective of understanding the technical and the creative processes of traditional Indian miniature paintings. This substantial collection is represented here by a display of several dozen exquisite drawings of Indian miniature paintings belonging to various regional schools, between 17th and 19th centuries. The significant themes on view are Ramayana series and other numerous subjects.

The entire eastern wing on the first floor of Museum building was renovated with the financial assistance received from Ministry of Culture, New Delhi, 2012–2013. On the south-eastern side of the renovated wing, Priyakant T. Munshaw Gallery of Coinage has on display a representative collection of historical phases of coinage of India, which was posthumously gifted by Smt. Nandiniben Munshaw in 2013 The collection includes the earliest punched-marked coins called bentbar (c. 600 BC), Akbar's Din-i-Ilahi coin, Jahangir's Zodiac series in silver, Adil Shah's Larin (dated 1668) and contemporary currency.

On the north-western side of the First Floor, the Muni Punyavijayaji Gallery has a section devoted to Gopi-Anand Bead Work Collection. The art of Moti Guthana or Moti Poravanu is practiced mainly at Saurashtra and Kutch regions of Gujarat. This art has been in vogue since centuries but became wide spread during the late 19th century These patterns have been mostly used for household decoration and marriage ceremonies. Women of Kathi community in Gujarat have mastery over this art-form, who are fond of engaging in bead work for their domestic applications as well. The Gopi-Anand Bead Work Collection has been gifted to the museum by Shri Mahesh and Smt. Usha Pandya (March 2013), in memory of his parents, Shri Dalpatram and Gopiben Pandya. This interesting material augments the museum's holdings with a representative group of Gujarati handicrafts.

== Galleries ==
The collections over time have enriched the museum through generous permanent gifts by groups of donors. To acknowledge those contributors and as tribute to their memory, the various galleries and sections in the museum have been named after them, such as (1) Muni Punyavijayaji Gallery (2) Madhuri D. Desai Gallery (3) Kasturbhai Lalbhai Collection of Indian Drawings (4) Leelavati Lalbhai Woodwork Collection (5) Arvind Lalbhai Collection (6) Priyakant T. Munshaw Gallery of Coinage (7) Gopi-Anand Beadwork Collection.

== Conservation Laboratory ==
The modest Conservation laboratory of the museum has facilities for conservation of miniature paintings on paper. Preliminary surface cleaning of stone sculptures and metal objects is also carried out here.

== Art Reference Library ==
Museum also have in house Art Reference Library. Over the past decades an Art Reference Library (including rare books) has grown in the museum's basement with donation of books, further enhanced with financial assistance received from Ministry of Culture, New Delhi, 2012–2013.
