= Shringara-Prakasha =

Book on Sanskrit poetry authored by Raja Bhoja

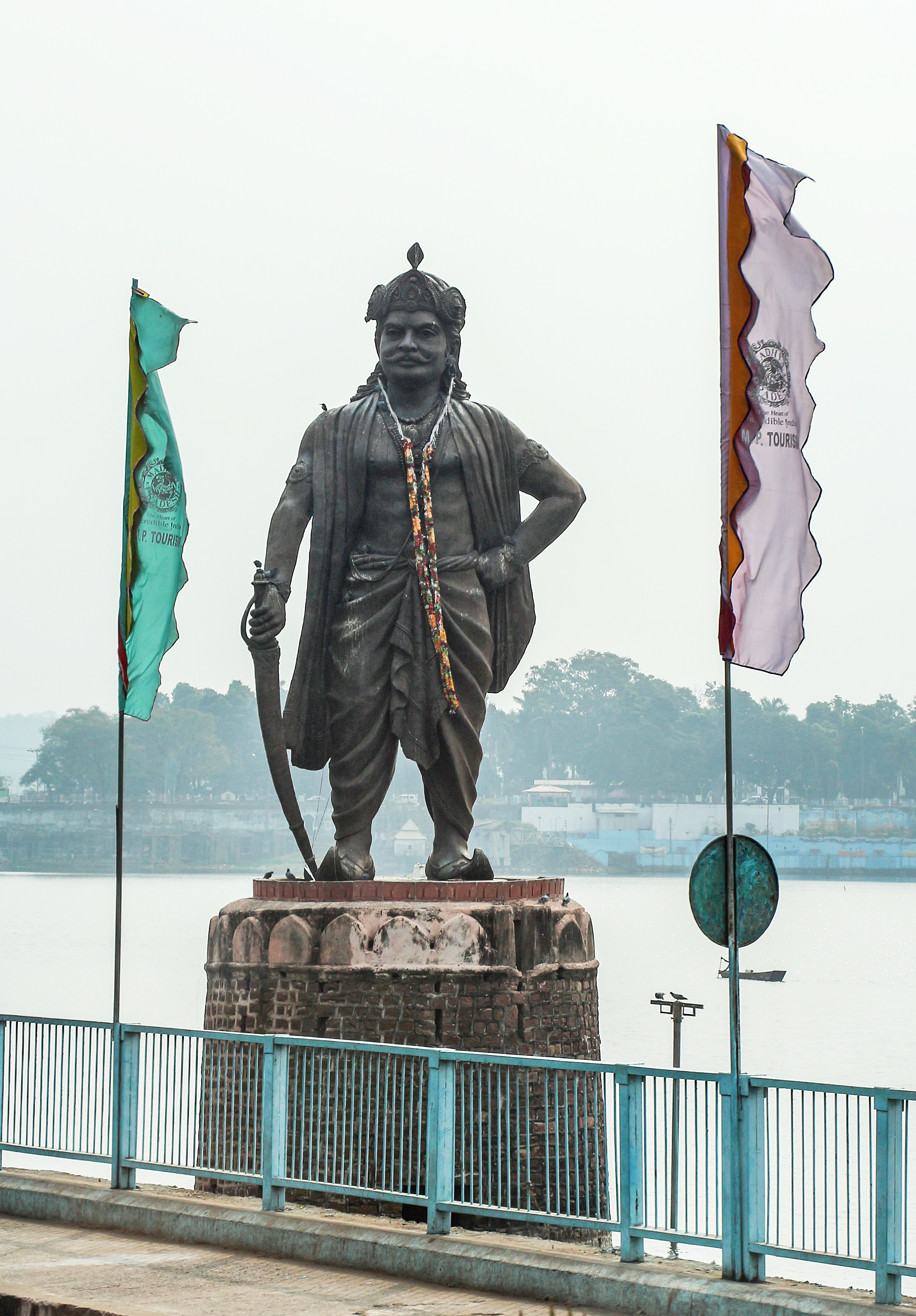
Raja Bhojadeva, a king from Paramara dynasty and author of Shringara-Prakasha

Sringara Prakasa (शृङ्गार प्रकाश – Śṛṅgāra Prakāśa) is a voluminous set of Sanskrit poetry consisting of thirty-six chapters, documented in 1908. It deals mostly with Alamkara-Shastra (rhetoric) and rasa, and is claimed to have been authored by Raja Bhoja, the king of Paramara dynasty in the early 11th century. A large extent of this magnum opus is dedicated to Sringara Rasa, which according to Bhoja's theory: "is the only one Rasa admissible."

== Overview ==
A specialist on the subject, Sivaprasad Bhattacharya, considered Shringara-Prakasha as the most "detailed and provocative" discourse on rasa. According to P.V. Kane, Shringara-Prakasha can be considered as an encyclopaedia of various branches in Sanskrit literature such as Darsanas, poetry, and dramaturgy, written extensively by quoting numerous works which existed in that period. Some have argued, however, that no Sanskrit literature was developed after Abhinavagupta's rasa literature – Abhinavabharati. But scholars such as V Raghavan and Sheldon Pollock disagree with this view and assert that Bhojadevs's Shringara-Prakasha can be considered as an equally profound Sanskrit literature as Abhinavaguptas' Abhinavabharati. Carl Olson translated the title as "Revelation of Love" and described it as an expression of self-love, which according to Bhoja, was a much higher and most often expressed form of emotion in the world. He further interprets the poetry as an emotion of love which refines the human ego Ahamkara and develops self-consciousness Abhimana in a person.

== Translations ==
Though many scholars have attempted to translate this magnum opus of Raja Bhojadeva, Sheldon Pollock's and Dr. V Raghavan's works are considered as dominant interpretations. Pollock notes that in spite of the fact that the Shringara-Prakasha is so relevant in the current time because of its content and its similarity with existing Sanskrit literature including its organization and style, it had not attracted much attention except in South India and Bengal. During the mid-20th century, there were claims of only four incomplete manuscripts available, out of which two were transcripts of a third one. But, V. Raghavan's translated commentary based on the fourth manuscript is considered valuable among scholars even today.

== The Cantos ==
This work of Bhoja is different from his other, smaller works such as Sarasvatī-kaṇṭhabharaṇa. The name Shringara-Prakasha bears significance as it attempts to deal with Sringara Rasa of Ahamkara and Abhimana. In chapter I, Bhoja talks about rasa as the "greatest element by virtue", and thus, men are called Rasikas accordingly. This is invoked through Kavya drama and poetry. There, Bhoja refers to Bhamaha and attempts to unite the two by calling them "शब्दार्थो सहितौ काव्यम": Poetry is word (Sabda) and sense (Artha) united. Most of the content in chapter I-VI deals with grammar, word, sense, and Sahitya. Chapters VII-VIII deal with the relationship between Sabda and Artha, and defining Sahitya by dividing it into Sabda and Artha. Chapter IX deals with poetical relations with Sahitya, whereas chapter X is primarily about different kinds of Alamkaras. In chapter XI, Bhoja calls his work as "Sahitya-Prakasha" and gives more importance to rasa by saying: "A poetry may be as much flawless by adopting Alamkara, but every poet should pay apt attention to the rasa, as it is the greatest factor of beauty and in the absence of it, all other beauties are in vain." In chapter XII, rasa, as well as the structure of drama are discussed. Chapter XIII classifies Ahamkara-Sringar into four: Dharma, Artha, Kama, and Moksa and briefly describes the activities to be fulfilled to achieve the four purusharthas. The rest of this voluminous works deals with rasas, the greatest Sahitya of Sabda and Artha in Kavya.

== Bibliography ==
- Pollock, Sheldon (1998), "Bhojs's Śṛṅgāraprakāśa and the Problem of Rasa: A Historical Introductionand Translation", Asiatische Studien, 70 (1)
- Raghavan, V (1978), Bhoja's Śr̥ṅgāra prakāśa, Madras: Raghavan, OCLC 557602551
