= Bilhanan =

1948 film directed by K. V. Srinivasan

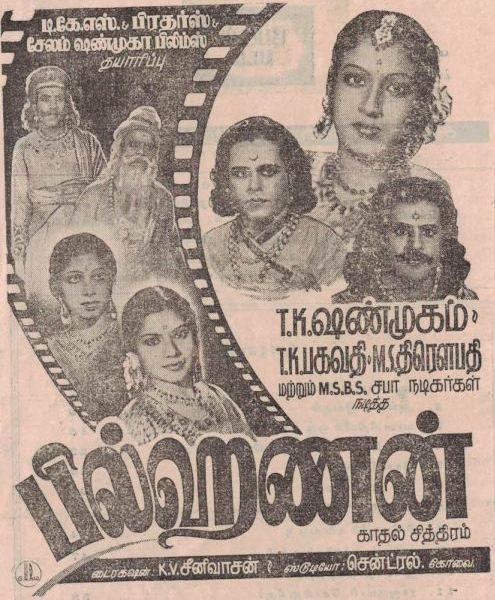
- Poster
- Directed by: K. V. Srinivasan
- Screenplay by: A. S. A. Sami
- Based on: Bilhanan by A. S. A. Sami
- Produced by: T. K. Shanmugam
- Starring: T. K. Shanmugam; T. K. Bhagavathi; M. S. Draupathi
- Music by: T. A. Kalyanam
- Production company: TKS Brothers
- Release date: 23 April 1948
- Country: India
- Language: Tamil

Bilhanan is a 1948 Indian Tamil-language historical romance film directed by K. V. Srinivasan, written by A. S. A. Sami and produced by T. K. Shanmugam of TKS Brothers. An adaptation of the play of the same name by Sami, itself based on the story of the Kashmiri poet Bilhana, Shanmugam also stars as the title character, along with T. K. Bhagavathi, M. S. Draupathi, T. K.Sivathanu and "Friend" Ramasami.

== Plot ==
A king looking for a teacher to educate his daughter, Yamini, eventually settles on the poet Bilhana. To prevent any romance from developing between the two, the king tells Yamini that Bilhana is blind, and Bilhana that Yamini is deformed. He hangs a curtain between the two to prevent them from seeing each other. One night, amused by the sight of the full moon, Bilhana sings a poem in praise. Yamini, wondering how a blind man can compose a poem about the moon's beauty, pulls down the curtain and finds that Bilhana is attractive and youthful. He too finds the princess attractive in turn. The two fall in love and want to marry. The king opposes their wish and when Bilhana and Yamini do not listen to him, he sentences both of them to death. The king's friends and people protest and, understanding the power of true love, he forgives Bilhana and Yamini and lets them marry.

== Production ==
A. S. A. Sami wrote and produced the Tamil play Bilhanan, based on the life of the Kashmiri poet Bilhana, for his college's annual day celebrations. The play became a success, and soon he submitted it to the Tiruchirappalli station of All India Radio, who broadcast it as a radio drama, with M. K. Thyagaraja Bhagavathar playing the title character. The radio drama was also a success, and T. K. Shanmugam of TKS Brothers bought the rights to the play. He later adapted it into a film with the same name, and starred as the title character, with M.S. Draupathi playing princess Yamini and T. K. Bhagavathi playing her father, the king. Sami rewrote the script for the film adaptation, which K. V. Srinivasan directed. Shooting took place at Central Studios in Coimbatore.

== Soundtrack ==
The music of the film was composed by T. A. Kalyanam and the lyrics were penned by Baskaradas. One of the songs, "Thoondir Puzhuvinaipol" that was sung by the TKS brothers, used lyrics by the late Tamil poet Subramania Bharati. Film producer A. V. Meiyappan, who held the copyright to all of Bharati's work, sued the TKS Brothers for copyright infringement.

== Release and reception ==
Bilhanan was released on 23 April 1948. According to film historian Randor Guy, the film was an average success because audiences "felt it was stagy in presentation".
