= Colophon =

Colophon may refer to:

- Colophon (city) in ancient Greece, located in modern Turkey
- Colophon (beetle), a genus of stag beetle
- Colophon (publishing), a brief description of the manuscript or book in which it is written or printed
- The Colophon, A Book Collectors' Quarterly, published 1929–1950

== See also ==
- Rosin, also called colophony, a solid form of resin
- Andradite (formerly grossular), also called colophonite, a mineral
