= Rājamārtaṇḍa =

Rājamārtaṇḍa (also called Yogasārasaṅgraha and Nanāvidhayogasārasaṅgraha) is a Sanskrit treatise on Āyurveda attributed to the Paramara king Bhoja (r.c. 1010-1055) of the Malwa region in west-central India. It is primarily a work describing mono-herbal Ayurvedic medicinal preparations. The work is divided into 34 chapters. The first chapter deals with diseases of the head and the last chapter is concerned with animal diseases. Rājamārtaṇḍa is one of the earliest Ayurveda texts to mention a specific prescription as a contraceptive.
