= Sarasvati-Kanthabharana =

Sarasvati-Kanthabharana (Sanskrit: सरस्वती-कण्ठाभरण, Sarasvatī-Kaṇṭhābharaṇa) [transl. Necklace of the Goddess Sarasvati] is a Sanskrit Vyakarana treatise, authored by Bhoja deva, a king of Paramara dynasty in the 11th century. The work consists of eight chapters, each further divided into four-quarters dealing with both non-Vedic and Vedic language. The work is styled in a similar fashion as Pāṇini's Aṣṭādhyāyī. Some experts consider the Bhoja's work as a revision of the veteran Panini and among "most voluminous" Sanskrit works. The book has incorporated many sutras from various Sanskrit authors in the form of his grammar. Some commentators also argue that the work is also known as Lakshana-Prakasha. While some note, Bhoja had authored another extensive work, which concentrated on poetry with the same title. In line with many Sanskrit grammarians who had incorporated Panini's Vedic sutras to understand classical Vedic mantras. Bhoja asserts anyone who aspires to learn Sanskrit grammar, has to query everything from the sutra's alone and not to search in different texts. Radhamadhab Dash, a Sanskrit scholar and Vice-Chancellor of Shri Jagannath Sanskrit Vishvavidayalaya commends Sarasvati-Kanthabharana of Bhoja and compares it to Panini and observes that no other grammarians have attempted to present the classical Sanskrit grammar in a Vedic perspective.

== Bibliography ==
- Dash, Radhamadhab (2007). "Vedic Formulations in Sarasvati-Kanthabharana Some Observations". Annals of the Bhandarkar Oriental Research Institute. 88: 171–181. JSTOR 41692092.
