= Nabhi-nandana-jinoddhara-prabandha =

Medieval Jain text

Information
- Religion: Jainism
- Author: Kakka Suri
- Language: Sanskrit
- Period: 1336

The Nābhi-nandana-jinoddhāra-prabandha is a 1336 Sanskrit book in the prabandha genre written by the Jain scholar Kakka Suri (Kakkasūri). The main objective of the book is to record the renovation of the Rishabhanatha Jain temple on Shatrunjaya hill in Gujarat, during the Delhi Sultanate rule. The work also provides other information, such as a history of the author's spiritual lineage (gaccha) and a description of the Delhi Sultan Alauddin Khalji's military conquests.

== Background ==
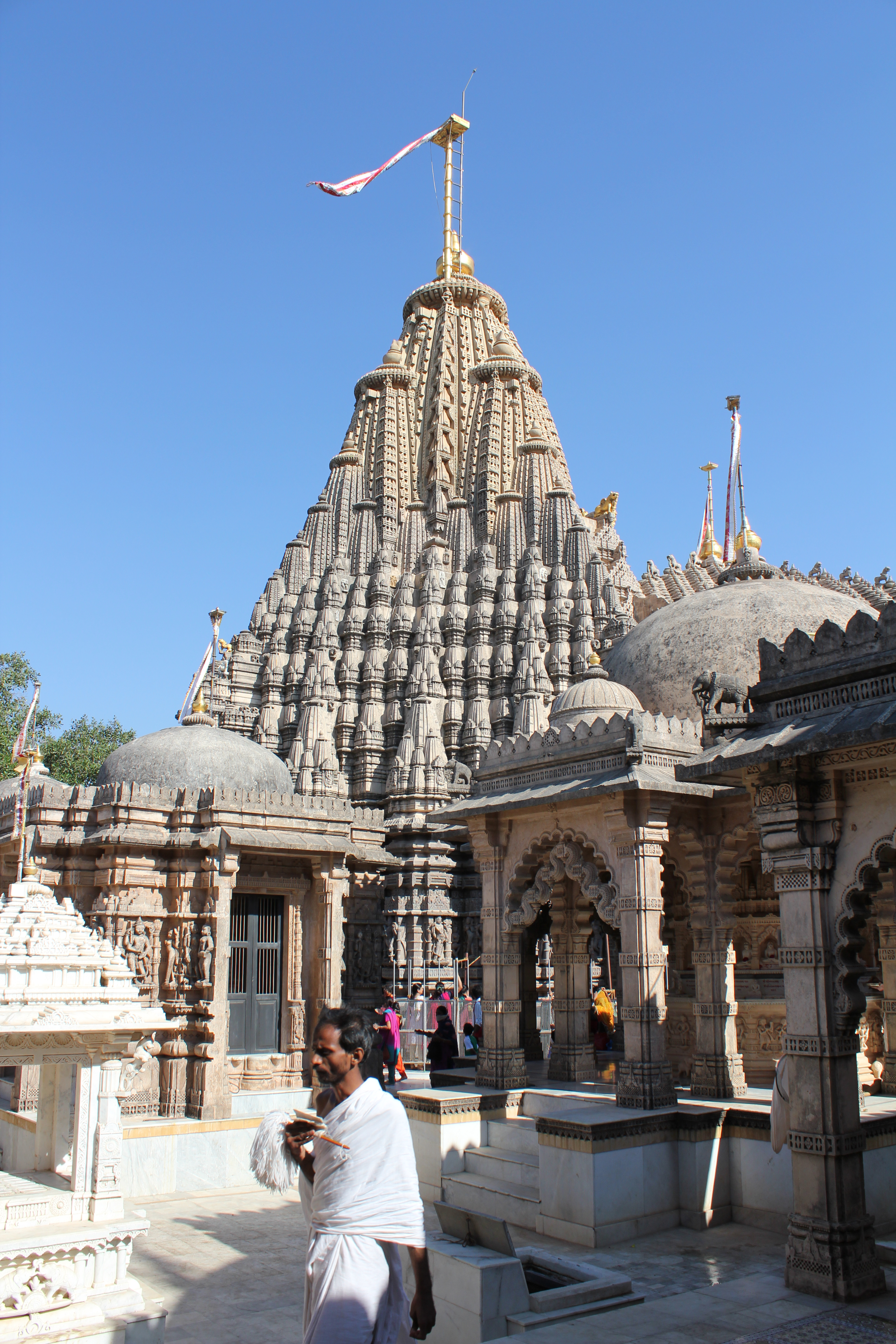
Rishabhanatha temple on Shatrunjaya hill which replaced the renovated temple in 16th century.

During Alauddin Khalji's conquest of Gujarat, some Jain temples in Gujarat had been desecrated. In 1315, Alauddin's governor Alp Khan allowed restoration of these temples. Samara Shaha, a wealthy merchant from Patan, led a large pilgrimage to Shatrunjaya, and carried out a renovation of the temples in a grand ceremony. His guide was Siddhasuri, an acharya of the Upakesha-gaccha.

This was the fifteenth renovation of the Shatrunjaya temples. During the seventh renovation, an image from the sixth renovation had been hidden in a cave. Siddhasuri found this image of the Jain tirthankara Adinatha, and Samara had it reconsecrated during the fifteenth renovation.

Kakka Suri, a disciple of Siddhasuri, composed Nabhi-nandana-jinoddhara-prabandha to narrate the story of this fifteenth renovation, as well as the previous renovations. The title of the work means "Narrative of the Renovation of the Temple of the Jina Who is the Joy of Nabhi". In addition, the book provides a history of the author's spiritual lineage.

The text was completed in 1336 CE (1393 VS). It contains 2344 verses, which provide information about the social, economic, religious and political history of the period.

== Description of Alauddin's achievements ==
Notably, the book also contains 9 verses describing the military conquests of the Delhi Sultan Alauddin Khalji, a Muslim whose forces had destroyed the temples. Kakka Suri does not list the motives of Muslims in destroying the temples, and suggests that such misfortunes are to be expected in the sinful Kali Yuga. He instead focuses on demonstrating the Jain community's prosperity by describing the lavish renovations.

Kakka Suri describes the military conquests of Alauddin as follows:

Verse	Meaning
III.1 - "The ruler at that time was Sultān Alāvadīna who like the ocean covered the earth on all sides. Like mighty billows were his prancing horses."	Alāvadīna here refers to Alauddin Khalji
III.2 - "Going to Devagiri, he captured its ruler, but reinstated him there to serve as it were a pillar of his victory."	This refers to Alauddin Khalji's conquest of Devagiri. The ruler of Devagiri is the Yadava king Ramachandra, who continued to rule as Alauddin's vassal after his defeat.
III.3 - "Having slain the proud and brave ruler, Hammīra, the overlord of Sapādalakṣa, he took all that he (Hammīra) had."	This refers to Alauddin Khalji's conquest of Ranthambore. Hammīra is the Chahamana ruler of Ranthambore.
III.4 - "He captured the lord of Citrakūṭa fort, took away his property, and made him move like a monkey from one city to another"	Chitrakuta (IAST: Citrakūṭa) is the modern Chittor Fort, which Alauddin captured after the 1303 siege. According to Muslim chronicles, the ruler of Chittor (presumably Ratnasimha) surrendered to Alauddin, who spared his life. Kakka Suri's verse corroborates this account.
III.5 - "On account of his prowess, Karṇa, the ruler of Gurjaratrā, fled away in all haste and having wandered about in many kingdoms died the death of a pauper."	This refers to Alauddin Khalji's conquest of Gujarat, after which the Vaghela king Karna was forced to flee his kingdom.
III.6 - "Besieged by him in his own fort, the ruler of Mālwā passed there many days, living like a captive, and then died bereft of heroism."	This refers to Alauddin Khalji's conquest of Malwa. Alauddin's forces defeated the main Malwa army led by prime minister Goga, after which the Paramara king Mahalakadeva took shelter in Mandu. Ultimately, Alauddin's forces captured Mandu and killed him.
III.7 - "Resembling Indra in prowess, he brought under his control the rulers of Karṇāṭa, Pāṇḍu and Tiliṅga countries."	This refers to the southern campaigns of Alauddin's general Malik Kafur. Karṇāṭa is the Hoysala kingdom of present-day Karnataka, whose ruler Ballala III became Alauddin's tributary after the Siege of Dwarasamudra. Tiliṅga refers to Telangana, whose Kakatiya king Prataparudra also became a tributary of Alauddin after the Siege of Warangal. Pāṇḍu is the Pandya kingdom, which Malik Kafur raided in 1311.
III.8 - "Who can count the strong forts, prominent among which stand Sāmyāyana and Jābālipura, which he captured."	Sāmyāyana and Jābālipura refer to modern Siwana and Jalore, which were besieged and captured by Alauddin's forces.
III.9 - "Armies of the Kharaparas roamed about in his country. He dealt with them in a manner that prevented their return."	Kharparas or Kharaparas are Mongols, who invaded Alauddin's kingdom in 1297-98, 1298, 1299, 1303, and 1305. In 1306, Alauddin's forces defeated them decisively, and subsequently, they never returned to India during his reign.
