= Jayavarman II of Malwa =

Jayavarman II
- Maharajadhiraja

King of Malwa
- Reign: c. 1255-1274
- Predecessor: Jaitugi
- Successor: Arjunavarman II
- Pradhan: Chāduri; Ajayadeva
- Issue: Arjunavarman II; Possibly Bhoja II and Mahalakadeva
Regnal name
- "Jayavarman" or "Jayasimha"
- Dynasty: Paramara
- Father: Devapala
- Religion: Hinduism

Jayavarman II (ruled c. 1255-1274 CE), also known as Jayasimha II, was a king of the Paramara dynasty in central India. He ruled in the Malwa region, succeeding his elder brother Jaitugi.

The king is mentioned by the names "Jayavarman" or "Jayasimha" in his various inscriptions. In the 1274 CE Mandhata copper-plate inscription, he is mentioned as both "Jayavarman" and "Jayasimha". In the past, there was some controversy among historians whether Jayavarman and Jayasimha were two different individuals.

Multiple inscriptions of Jayavarman mention that he stayed at Mandapa-Durga (present-day Mandu). Jayavarman or his predecessor Jaitugi might have moved from the traditional Paramara capital Dhara to Mandu, which offered a better defensive position, protected by the surrounding hills and the Narmada valley. This may have happened because of attacks of threats of attack from the neighbouring kingdoms. Balban, the general of the Delhi's Sultan Nasir-ud-din, had reached the northern frontier of the Paramara territory by this time. Around the same time, the Paramaras also faced attacks from the Yadava king Krishna of Deogiri and the Vaghela king Visaladeva of Gujarat.

Jayavarman was succeeded by his son Arjunavarman II, a weak ruler.

== Inscriptions ==
Locations of Jayavarman II's inscriptions (map of Madhya Pradesh)

Several inscriptions from Jayavarman reign, in Sanskrit language and Nagari script, have been discovered. These include:

- 1256 CE (VS 1312) Rahatgarh stone inscription (as Jayasimha-deva)
- 1257 CE (VS 1314) Atru inscription (as Jayasimha)
- 1258 CE (VS 1314) Modi stone inscription (as Jayavarman)
- 1261 CE (VS 1317) Mandhata copper-plate inscription (as Jayavarma-deva)
- 1263 CE (VS 1320) Bhilsa stone inscription (as Jayasimha-deva)
- 1269 CE (VS Pathari inscription (as Jayasingha)
- 1274 CE (VS 1331) Mandhata copper-plate inscription (as Jayavarman and Jayasimha-deva)

=== 1256 Rahatgarh inscription ===
The Rahatgarh inscription, dated 28 August 1256 CE (VS 1312), was discovered on a stone slab by Alexander Cunningham during the 1870s. The 14-line inscription is written in Sanskrit prose.

The inscription drafts a royal document of Maharajadhiraja ("great king") of Dhara. As the inscription is partially damaged, different scholars have read the name of the king as "Jayasimhadeva" or "Jayavarmadeva".

It is possible that Jayavarman captured the Rahatgarh area from the Chandelas.

=== 1257 Atru inscription ===
The 1257 CE Atru inscription was discovered by D. R. Bhandarkar on the pillar of the Gadgach temple in Atru. The 6-line inscription records the grant of the Mhaisada village to a kavichakravartin ("emperor of poets") Thakara Narayana. It ends with a curse to anyone who revokes the grant.

The inscription names the donor Maharajadhiraja (great king) Jayasimha, although it does not mention his royal house. Historians have identified him as the Paramara king Jayavarman. Inscriptions of the earlier Paramara king Udayaditya have been found at Jhalrapatan at Shergadh in present-day Rajasthan. It appears that Jayavarman extended the Paramara territories further in the north, resulting in a conflict with the Chahamana rulers of Ranthambore.

The 1288 CE Balvan inscription of the Chahamana king Hammira suggests that his father Jaitrasimha (died 1283 CE) defeated the Jayasimha of Mandapa-Durga. It states that he defeated the brave warriors of Jayasimha at Jhampaighatta, and imprisoned them at the Ranthambore fort.

=== 1258 Modi inscription ===
This fragmented stone inscription was found near the ruins of a temple complex, in Modi village near Bhanpura. Some broken parts of this inscription are now lost. Besides a prashasti (eulogy) of the Paramara dynasty, the objective of the inscription was to record the donations towards the construction of a temple complex. It can be inferred that it was originally set up in a newly constructed temple. According to the inscription, Modi (IAST: Mauḍī) was originally the headquarters of a mandala (subdivision). The site of the temples is now submerged under the Chambal dam reservoir.

The text of the inscription comprises kāvya (verses), composed by the Brahmin Vamana in shardulavikridita and sragdhara metres.

Although several fragments of the inscription are now lost, it appears that its first verse invokes Shiva, and also pays obeisance to Heramba (Ganesha) and Kuvera. The next few parts contained auspicious shlokas, which are now lost. The subsequent verses contain an account of the mythical origin of the Paramara dynasty, in which the sage Vashistha crates a hero called Paramara on Arbuda mountain (Mount Abu). The inscription also describes Jayavarman and his predecessors, but the part containing the description of Jayavarman is now lost.

Next, the inscription mentions a Pashupata sage named Mallikarjuna. Based on the information that can be gathered from the fragments, it appears that the sage was credited with building a temple (or temples), and installing the idols of deities. This is followed by a list of donations of money, land and villages towards the construction of the temple complex. The list includes the name of Jayavarman's mahapradhana (prime minister) Chāduri, who donated a village in name of Vaidyanatha.

=== 1261 Mandhata plates ===
This inscription contains two dates of the year VS 1317, corresponding to 7 November 1260 CE (the date of the grant) and 12 May 1261 (the date of composition). It comprises two copper plates discovered in 1904 at Godarpura village on the Mandhata island. It contains an image of a bearded Garuda (the Paramara emblem) in human form.

The inscription records the grant of the Vadauda village by Gangadeva to three Brahmins. The village is divided into 6 shares:

Shares	Donee	Gotra	Shakha
4	Agnihotri Mādhava-śarman, the son of Pathaka Hāriśarman, grandson of Dviveda Veda	Bhārgava	Mādhyandina
1	Chaturveda Jānardana, the son of Dviveda Līmadeva, grandson of Dviveda Lāshū	Gautama	Āśvalāyana
1	Dviveda Dhāmadeva-śarman, son of Dikshita Divākara, grandson of Dikshita Kekū	Bhārdvāja	Mādhyandina

Gangadeva is described as a devotee of Shiva, and a member of the Pratihara clan. The inscription is issued by Maharajadhiraja Jayavarmadeva, on whose orders Gangadeva made the grant. Jayavarman is mentioned as a resident of the Mandapa-Durga. At its beginning, the inscription contains a genealogy of the Paramara kings from Bhoja to Devapala. It states that Devapala was succeeded by his son Jaitugi, who held the title Bālanārāyana; Jaitugi was succeeded by Jayavarman. It also names two officials: Pandita Mālādhara (the minister of war and treaty) and Ajayadeva (the mahapradhana or prime minister).

The text inscription was composed by Harśadeva, and revised by the grammarian Āmadeva. The inscription was engraved by Kānhaḍa.

=== 1263 Bhilsa inscription ===
This 10-line inscription, dated 12 April 1263 CE, was discovered by D. C. Sircar. It features a donkey-and-woman motif. Written in corrupt Sanskrit, it records the performance of a pious act (donation) by a woman named Sanumati or Bhanumati. The act was performed for the religious merit of Pandita Thakura Madanasimha, who was probably her husband. The name of the donee is not mentioned. Therefore, it appears that the donation was in form of the idol of a deity, near which the stone inscription would have originally been set up.

The donation was made at Bhailasvamidevapura (Bhilsa or modern Vidisha), which the inscription states, was in the territory of the king Jayasimha-deva.

According to the 13th century Muslim historians, the Sultan of Delhi Iltutmish captured Bhilsa during 1233-34 CE (AH 632), and destroyed the Bhailasvamin temple. Jayavarman's 1274 CE plates claim that his father Devapala killed a mleccha adhipa (possibly the Muslim governor of the Delhi Sultanate) near the city of Bhailasvamin. Combined with the 1263 inscription, this would indicate that Bhilsa was reconquered by the Paramaras, and was a part of Jayavaraman's territory. This is further corroborated by the fact that the later Khalji Sultans of Delhi had to re-capture Bhilsa from Hindus.

=== 1269 Pathari inscription ===
This inscription, dated 10 April 1269 (VS 1326), was discovered at Pathari in Vidisha district. It records the allotment of land for a religious rite by one Ranasimha. The king's name is given as Jayasingha; although his royal house is not mentioned, but the expressions used in the inscription are similar to the ones used in the 1274 CE Mandhata copper-plate inscription of Jayavarman II. Based on this, Jayasingha can be identified as the Paramara king Jayavarmana II.

The inscription mentions Vaḍovyapattana, which is identified with the Badoh village near Pathari.

=== 1274 Mandhata plates ===
The Mandhata inscription, dated 10 August 1274 CE comprises four copper-plates held together by copper rings. It was discovered in 1927 while clearing the grounds of the Kashi-Vishveshvara temple at Mandhata. The inscription is written in a mixture of prose and verse. The last plate features Garuda, the Paramara royal emblem. The charter was authored by Jayavarman's courtier Srikantha, and engraved by the artisan Kanhaka. The artisan is probably same as Kanhada, the engraver of the 1261 inscription.

The inscription begins with the Om symbol, and pays obeisance to dharma (righteousness), which is described as the crown-jewel of the purusharthas (the four objectives of human life). This is followed by a salutation to the moon deity. The next few stanzas praise Parashurama, Rama and Shiva. Next, the text describes the locality (Omkareshwar-Mandhata), its presiding deity and its rivers (Narmada and Kaveri). The next verses seek blessings of Varaha (an avatar of Vishnu) and Pitamaha (Brahma). It then states that the Pitamaha created the seven sages including Vashistha, followed by the legend about the mythical origin of the Paramaras.

Next, the inscription lists the eight legendary successors of Paramara, the mythical hero who is said to have founded the dynasty. The eight names are Kamandaludhara, Dhumraja, Devasimhapala, Kanakasimha, Shriharsha, Jagaddeva, Sthirakaya and Voshari. Most of these do not appear to be historical figures. These names are followed by historically attested Paramara kings: Vairisimha, Vakpatiraja, Siya, Munja, Sindhuraja, Bhoja-deva, Udayaditya, Naravarman, Yashovarman, Ajayavarman, Vindhyavarman, Subhatavarman, Arjunavarman, Devapala, Jaitugi-deva and Jayavarman.

The inscription states that Jayavarman's army crossed the Vindhyas, and forced the forces of a southern ("Dakshinatya") king to retreat. According to D. C. Sircar, this king was probably Ramachandra, the Yadava king of Deogiri, who later defeated Jayavarman's successor Arjunavarman II. However, H. V. Trivedi argues that this is unlikely, because during the early part of his reign, Ramachandra was engaged in a conflict with his own brother Amana. The Dakshinatya king referred to here is probably Ramachandra's uncle Mahadeva. The Sangur inscription of the Yadavas refers to Mahadeva's invasion of Malwa.

The inscription then claims that Jayavarman erected temples with golden shikharas, planted gardens and excavated tanks; he also donated cities, gold and cows to Brahmins. It does not mention the names or locations of the temples, and no temples built by Jayavarman are known today.

Finally, the inscription records a grant of land by one Anayasimha-deva to several Brahmins of Mandhata, with the permission of the king. Anayasimha is mentioned as a sadhanika (commander of the army) from the Chahamana family, and a resident of the Mandapa Durga. The inscription describes the achievements of his ancestors, who were in the service of the previous Paramara kings. It also mentions the construction of temples and tanks, as well as other charitable donations made in the past by Anayasimha.

The king, variously named as Jayasimha and Jayavarman, is described as the lord of Dhara.
