= Hammira Raso =

Hindi-language poem by Jodharaja

Hammīra Rāso
- Author: Jodharaja
- Translator: Brajnath Bandyapadhyaya
- Language: Hindi
- Subject: Legendary biography of Hammiradeva
- Set in: 13th-14th century India
- Publication place: India

Hammira Raso, also called Hammir Raso or Hamir Raso, is an 18th or 19th century CE Hindi-language poem by Jodharaja. It contains a legendary biography of the 14th century king Rao Hamir (Hammir or Hammira of Ranthambore). Much of the text describes the conflict between Hamir and the Delhi Sultanate ruler Alauddin Khalji, presenting Hamir as a hero.

== Author ==
Jodharāj or Jodharāja, composed Hammira Raso sometime between 1728 CE and 1823 CE. He was a court poet, and composed the text for his patron, Raja Chandrabhan of Nimrana. Hammira Raso contains a brief autobiographical section that provides details about the poet. According to it, Jodharāja was a Gaur Brahman born in Bijawar in the province of Rat, to a man named Balakrishna. Jodharāja was an accomplished astronomer, astrologer, pandit, and a poet. His patron Chandrabhan gifted him "property, clothes, wealth, horses, houses and so on". Chandrabhan requested him to write an account of the conflict between Alauddin Khalji and Hamir.

== Plot ==
=== Hammira's ancestors ===
The poet describes his patron Chandrabhan as a descendant of Prithviraj Chauhan, and as the ruler of a prosperous kingdom. The poem begins with a description of the Agnikula legend, according to which the four major Rajput clans including the Chauhans, emerged from a Vedic ritual fire pit. After a Kshatriya king kills Parashurama's father, Parashurama slaughters the Kshatriyas, leaving no one to protect the sages and priests from demons (asuras / rakshasas). Seven sages - Gautama, Lomaharśana, Bhṛgu, Atteriya, Bharadvāj, Garg and Vasiṣṭha - perform a fire ritual while chanting Sama Veda hymns. Then the four Rajput clans unexpectedly emerge from the fire pit.

Chauhan, the progenitor of Hamir's clan, carries four weapons (sword, dagger, knife and bow) in his four arms. Shakti, the lion-riding goddess carries ten weapons in her ten arms, blesses him. Brahma instructs Chauhan to overcome all dangers for protecting his religion. The hero fights demons and seeks blessings of the goddess, who becomes his clan goddess (kuladevi) and is named "Ashapuri".

Many generations after Chauhan, a ruler named Raja (or Rao) Jeyat Chohan is born in the village of Barbagao. During a hunting expedition in a forest, he pursues a white boar, and encounters the sage (rishi) Padam. The sage blesses him, and asks him to establish a hill fort and worship Shiva there. The sage describes the particular hill area as full of tantric power. After returning to his court, the king starts building a fortified town, which is named Ranthambor. The Bhils, who inhabit the mountain, acknowledge his power and recognize him as their sovereign. During the construction of the fort, the wall of the portico keep falling even after being raised several times. The king then decides to sacrifice himself, and asks the foundation to be built on his body. Two of his loyal Bhil associates - Ravana and Basava - declare that the fort actually belonged to the Bhils, and the king is merely its nominal owner. They offer to be sacrificed in place of the king, asking the king to take care of Ravana's son Bhoj. Accordingly, the two Bhils are beheaded and their heads are used as foundation stones. The wall built on this foundation does not collapse.

=== Alauddin's rise to power ===
Meanwhile, Indra becomes afraid that the sage Padam's austere penances would make the sage more powerful than him. Therefore, Indra tries to disturb the sage's penance by sending apsaras (celestial nymphs) and kinnaras (celestial musicians). The sage resists the temptation for several seasons, but is ultimately attracted to the nymph Urvashi. When Urvashi leaves him, he dies in disappointment. The main characters of Hammira Raso are born out of the various parts of the sage's body: "the body of Ala-uddin was made of his head, that of Hamir of his breast, and those of Muhammad Shah and Mir Gabru of his hands."

Auspicious signs mark the birth of Rao Hamir. In contrast, Alauddin is born in a royal family, but his mother abandons him for being ugly, and replaces him with a good-looking infant born to a carder. Alauddin is brought by the carder's family and does not know about his true ancestry. Nevertheless, during role-play games, he plays a king, while the infant who replaces him plays a carder.

Meanwhile, a widow prays at the temple of the Sharaoji sect near Dehli [sic]. (The poet describes Sharaoji as a Buddhist sect, but states that the widow was blessed by the tirthankara Parasnath, who is actually a Jain figure.) As a result, she is blessed with good-looking twins, Basant Pal and Tej Pal. She also finds a treasure of gold and diamonds. When the boys grow up, they decide to build two temples at the meeting place of the Sharaoji sect on the Grinar [sic] hill. A pandit tells them that there is no point in building temples, because an emperor destined to destroy all temples had been born, and had been living at the home of a carder. The two brothers visit the carder's home, and present valuable gifts to Alauddin. Alauddin tells them he is just a poor carder: he initially refuses the gifts, and later distributes them among his playmates. The twins extoll Alauddin as their prince, and seek his permission to build the temples. Alauddin declares that he plans to destroy all the temples, because the gods had cursed him to a miserable life, but would make an exception for the twins' temples. Meanwhile, the emperor learns about Alauddin's identity, and brings him to the royal palace.

Sometime later, Alauddin marries a princess from Kandahar, and ascends the throne a year after his marriage. He then besieges and captures 84 forts across India. During a hunting expedition, Alauddin discovers that his queen was having an affair with his general Muhammed Shah. Fearing that his queen would commit suicide, Alauddin spares the general's life. But, he exiles the general from the kingdom, and threatens to destroy anyone who protects the general. The general departs from Delhi with his family, soldiers, servants, slaves, elephants and carriages. He seeks refuge from several princes, both Hindu and Muslim, including the rulers of "Kandesh, Kabul, Multan, Kashmir, Guzerat, Gandwana and Bengal". All of them decline to shelter him, fearful of Alauddin. Ultimately, Rao Hamir of Ranthambore grants him asylum.

Ravana conquered the three worlds and had perfect control over the gods, men and serpents; but when he made Raghunath his enemy, the splendid and strong fort of Lanka was sacked, burnt and pulled io the dust. Who can subdue Alauddin? If you think you can, you will certainly be destroyed.

— Alauddin's herald, warning Hamir against giving asylum to Muhammad Shah, in Hammira Raso

Hamir gives Muhammad Shah a jagir worth 500,000 rupees and a palace for residence, despite a warning from Alauddin's herald. Alauddin then sends multiple firmans to Hamir, offering him as much land and gold he desires, in return for handing over Muhammad Shah. However, Hamir refuses the offer, saying he will never break his promise. Alauddin then decides to besiege Ranthambore, against the advice of his vazir Mihram Khan. Alauddin's herald describes Ranthambore as a prosperous and powerful kingdom. He also states that Hamir was a deeply religious Hindu who had demolished all mosques in his territory, replacing them with temples.

=== The war between Alauddin and Hamir ===
Alauddin marches to Ranthambore with a large army, which includes a large number of Hindus. Some petty chiefs of Ranthambore flee in fear, but several loyalists stand by Hamir. In initial confrontations, Hamir's forces defeat Alauddin's army, inflicting heavy losses on the enemy. As the siege continues, Hamir prays to Shiva, and hears a divine voice commanding him to continue to fight to death, and declaring that his name and heroism will become immortal. Hamir's forces continue to achieve successes against the invading army. Alauddin invokes Muslim Pirs, but Hindu deities descend from heaven and defeat them in a violent contest. More battles follow, with Hamir's army reinforced by his vassals including the ruler of Chitor, and Alauddin's forces reinforced by Arabs and Rumanians. Hamir's forces win the first battle, and later, Alauddin's army captures the fort of his vassal Randhir.

Alauddin then marches to demolish the temples at Alanpur, but Hindu deities scare him away. On Mihram Khan's advice, Alauddin builds a dam to access the fort of Ranthambore, but Padam appears in form of a man and overflows the dam. Hamir holds festivities in his fort, including a performance by the talented dancer Chandrakala. Alauddin watches the performance from outside, and feeling insulted, orders an archer to injure Chandrakala. Muhammad Shah recognizes the archer as his younger brother Mir Gabru, and offers to shoot an arrow at Alauddin in revenge. Hamir tells him not to commit the sin of regicide, and on his order, Muhammad Shah shoots the royal umbrella over Alauddin's head instead.

Sarjan Shah, a merchant of the Sharaoji sect, allies with Alauddin, and conspires against Hamir to avenge his father's death. He throws animal hides into the grain stores of Ranthambore, rendering them unusable for the vegetarian Hindus. Alauddin once again sends a firman to Hamir, offering to end the siege, in return for Chandrakala the dancing girl, Hamir's virgin daughter Dewal Kimari, Paresh the philosopher's stone, and Muhammad Shah. An angry Hamir rejects the demands, and instead asks Alauddin to hand over his favorite queen Begum Chimna, Chintamani the philosopher's stone, and his four commanders. Hamir then prepares for the final battle, and sends his son Ratan Singh to Chitor.

Know that the firmness of Hamir, the pride and stubbornness of Ravana, the truth of Raja Harischandra, and the skilful archery of Arjun are unequalled in their potency, superior to the fear of death, to the love of life and kingdom. Is death to be feared when it brings an endless glory both here and hereafter?

— Hamir, rejecting Muhammad Shah's request to be surrendered to Alauddin, in Hammira Raso

In the ensuing battle, Hamir's forces outperform Alauddin's forces. Muhammad Shah and his brother Mir Gabru die in a combat with each other, fighting for the opposing sides. Alauddin makes a final attempt at reconciliation, promising to return to Delhi and to restore Hamir's territories to him in addition to giving him 52 additional parganas. Hamir rejects the offer, and continues the battle, losing his Bhil general Bhoj in the process. After suffering more setbacks, Alauddin sends a herald to Hamir, asking for a pardon, and promising to return to Delhi. Hamir refuses to end the battle, and his troops capture Alauddin. Hamir asks his soldiers not to kill Alauddin, declaring that it is a sin to kill an emperor "because he gives food to thousands of souls." He releases Alauddin, asking the emperor to return to Delhi.

Hamir's soldiers collect a variety of materials from the Delhi camp, including ensigns, and return to Ranthambore. When Hamir's wife Asha sees the Delhi ensigns from a distance, she assumes that the invaders had won, and orders a mass suicide of women to avoid falling into enemy hands. When Hamir enters the fort, he sees the dead bodies of the women, including his wife and his daughter. He decides to commit suicide, offering his head to Shiva. When Sarjan Shah calls Alauddin to Ranthambore, Alauddin admires Hamir, and orders the beheading of Sarjan Shah for being disloyal to Hamir.

== Legacy ==
Historian Kalika Ranjan Kanungo describes Hammira Raso as a pseudo-historical poem. According to historian Dasharatha Sharma, while the work is of "little historical value", it is useful as an evidence of Hammira's reputation for "chivalry, gallantry and bravery in war."

According to Alastair Dick, Hammira Raso is the earliest extant text that uses the word "sitar" to describe the musical instrument now widely known by that name.

== See also ==
- Hammira Mahakavya, another text on Hammira of Ranthambore
