= Devapala =

Devapala may refer to:

- Devapala (Pala dynasty), ruled Bengal region of India and Bangladesh during 9th century
- Devapala (Paramara dynasty), ruled Malwa region of central India during c. 1218–1239 CE
