= Mandu, Madhya Pradesh =

Mandu Mandav
- town
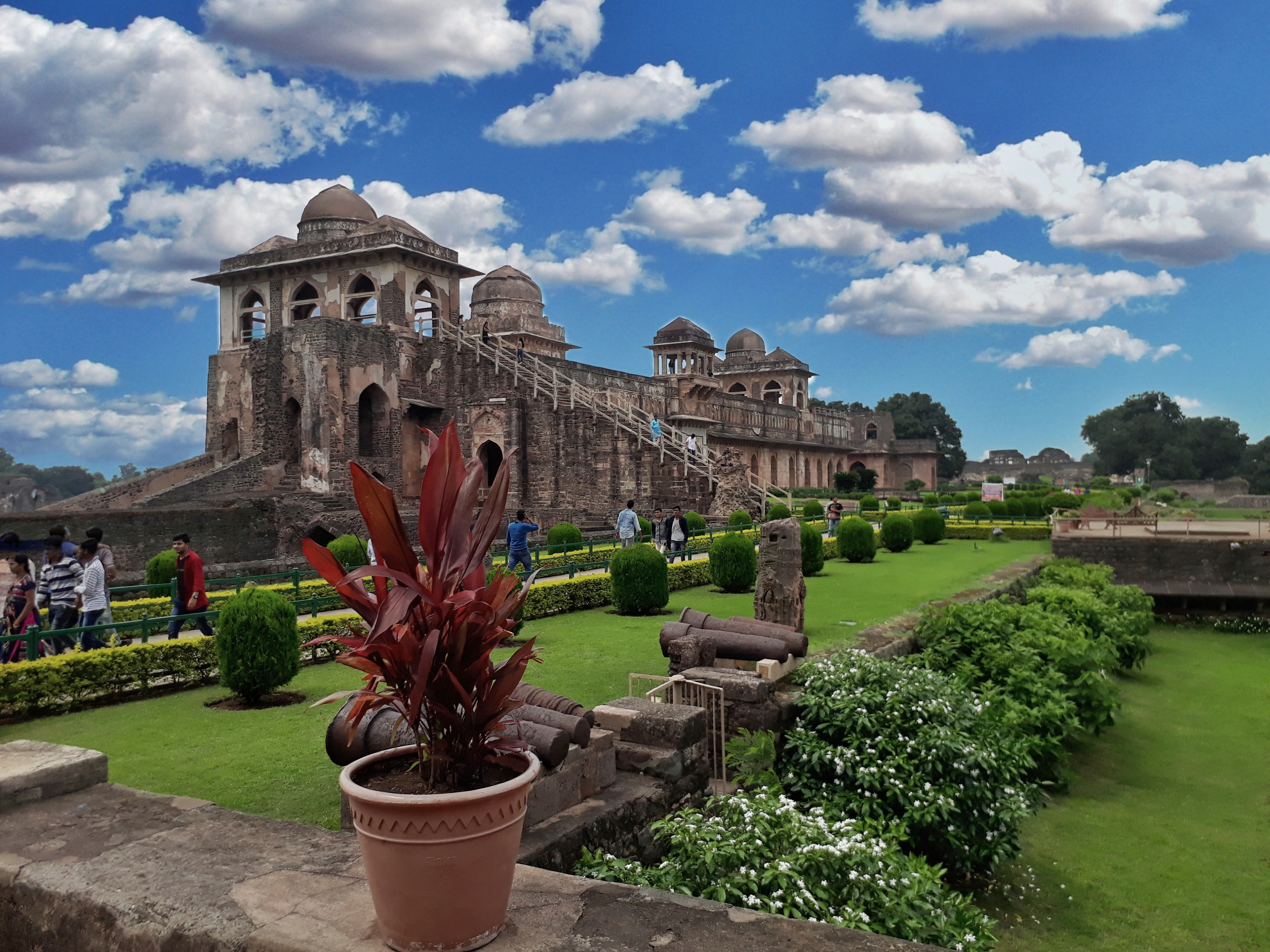
- Jahaz Mahal
- Nickname: mahal ka shahar
- Location within Madhya Pradesh Location within India
- Coordinates: 22°20′7″N 75°24′57″E
- Country: India
- State: Madhya Pradesh
- District: Dhar district
- Region: Malwa and Nimar

Languages
  - Official: Hindi
- Time zone: UTC+5:30 (IST)
- ISO 3166 code: IN-MP
- Vehicle registration: MP

Mandu or Mandavgad is an ancient city in the present-day Mandav area of the Dhar district. It is located in the Malwa and Nimar region of western Madhya Pradesh, India, at 35 km from Dhar city. In the 11th century, Mandu was the sub division of the Tarangagadh or Taranga kingdom. This fortress town on a rocky outcrop about 100 km (62 mi) from Indore is celebrated for its architecture.

== History ==
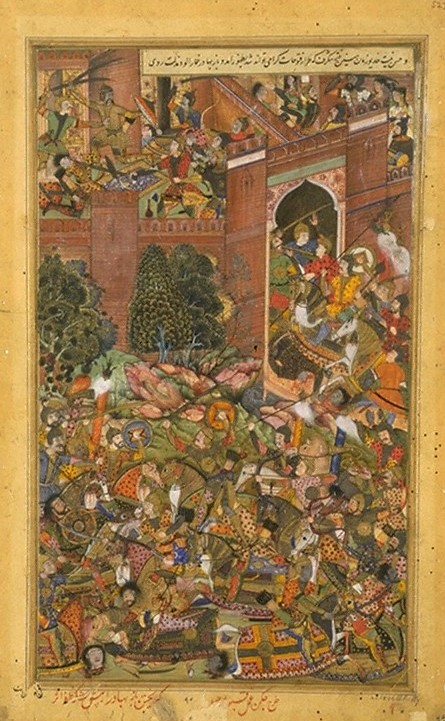
Mughal forces led by Adham Khan, enter the fort of Baz Bahadur of Malwa, 1561, Akbarnama ca 1590–95

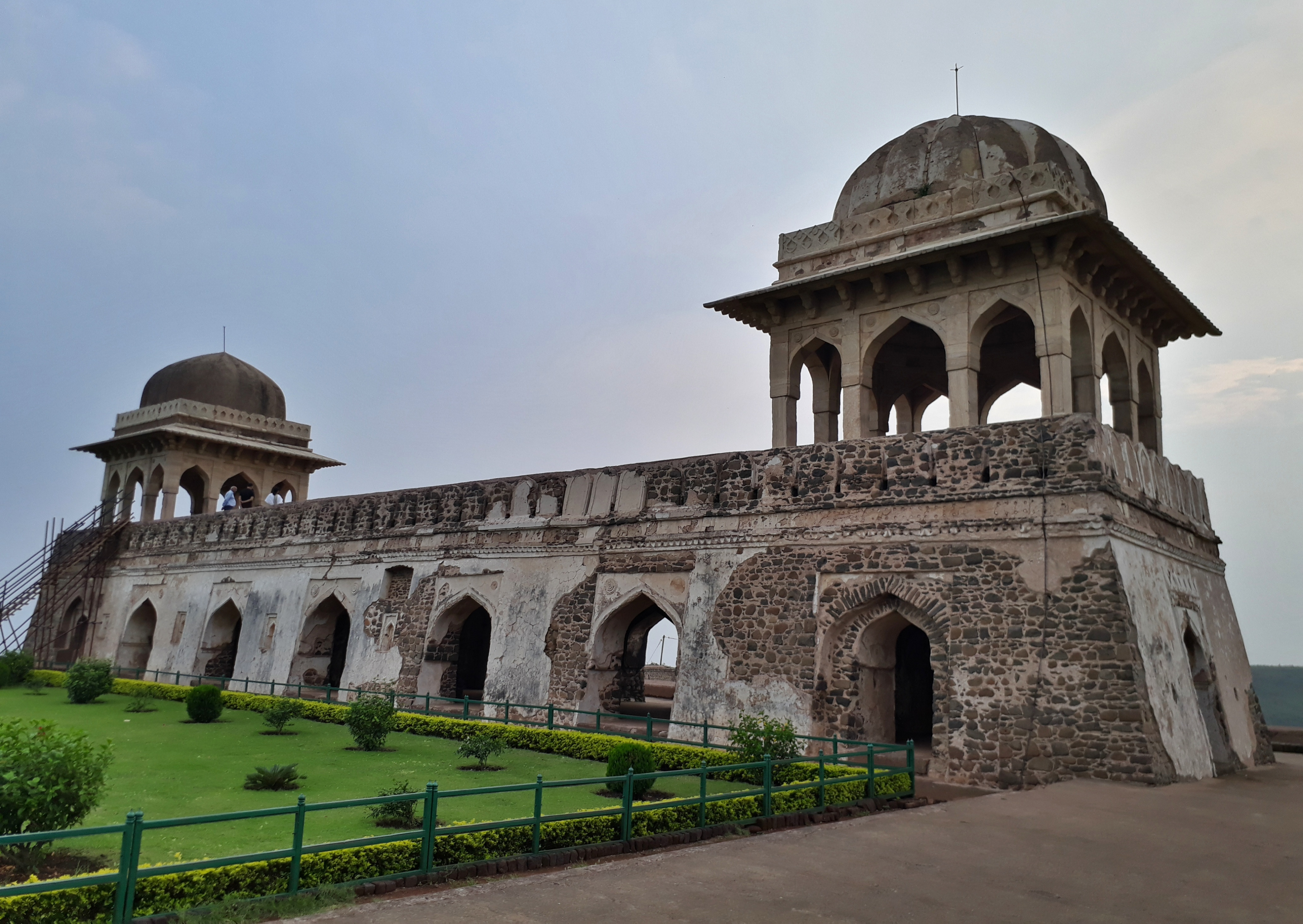
Roopmati's Pavilion

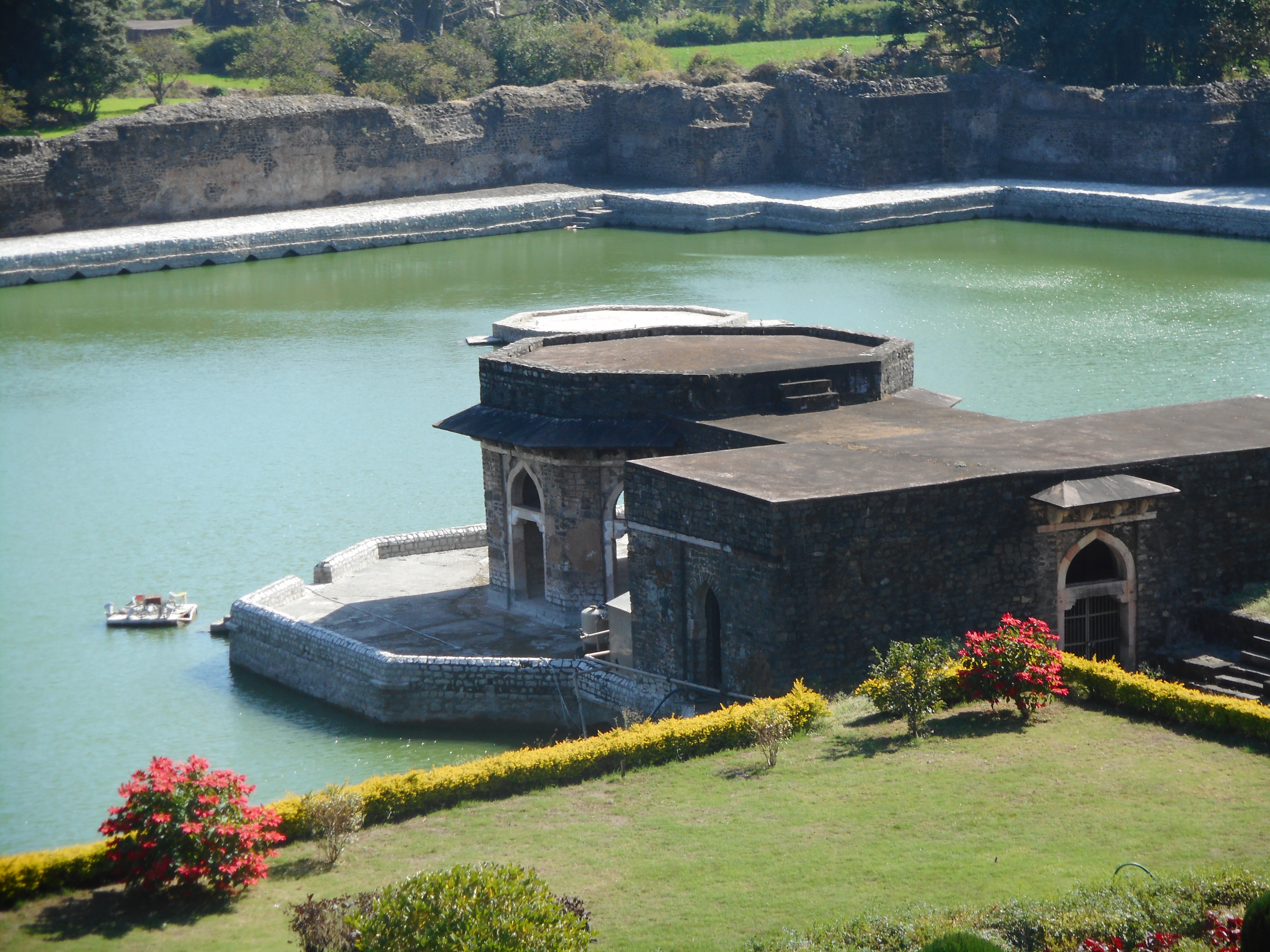
The Kapoor Talao situated in the Madu Fort

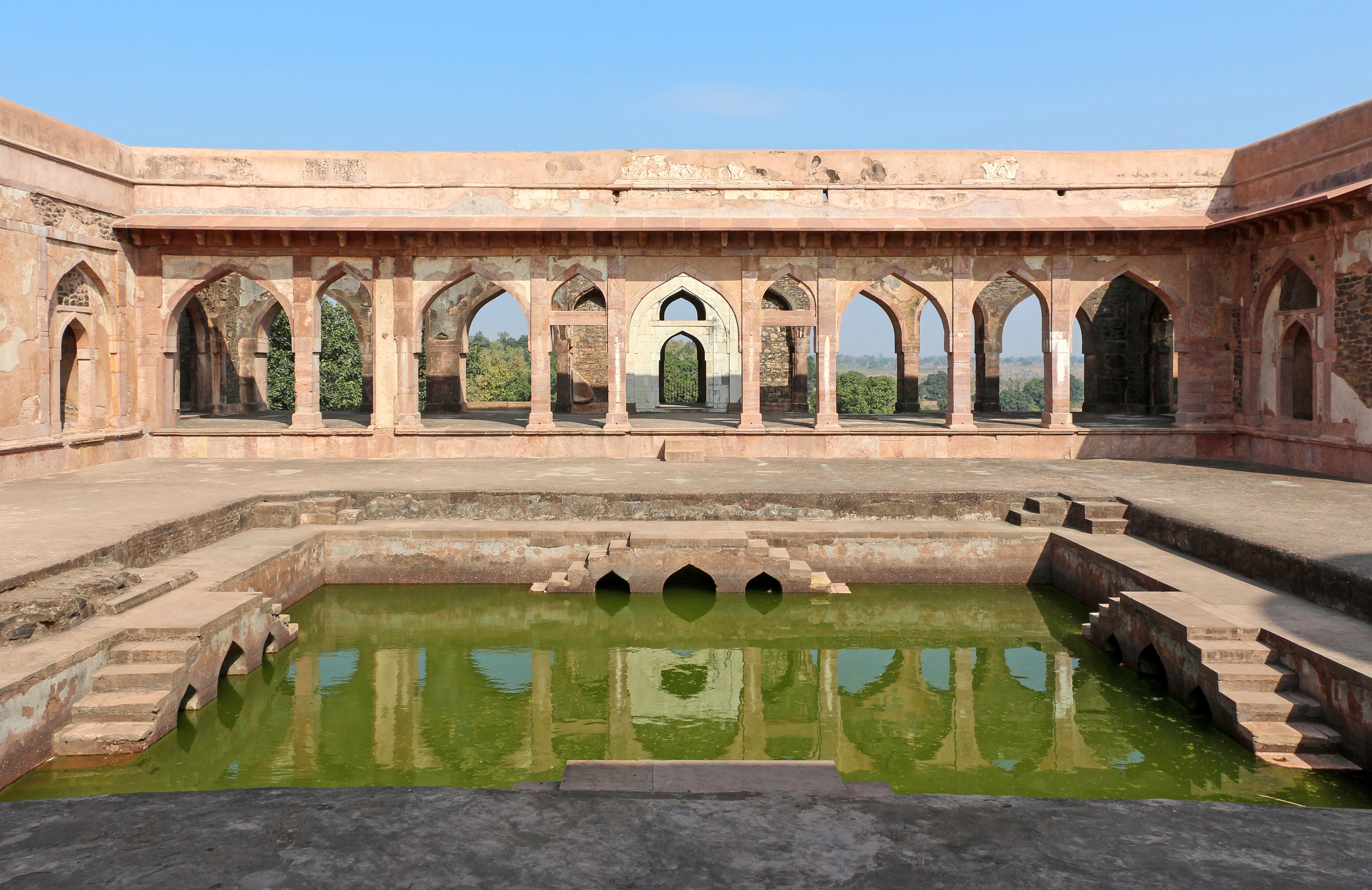
Main court of Baz Bahadur's Palace.

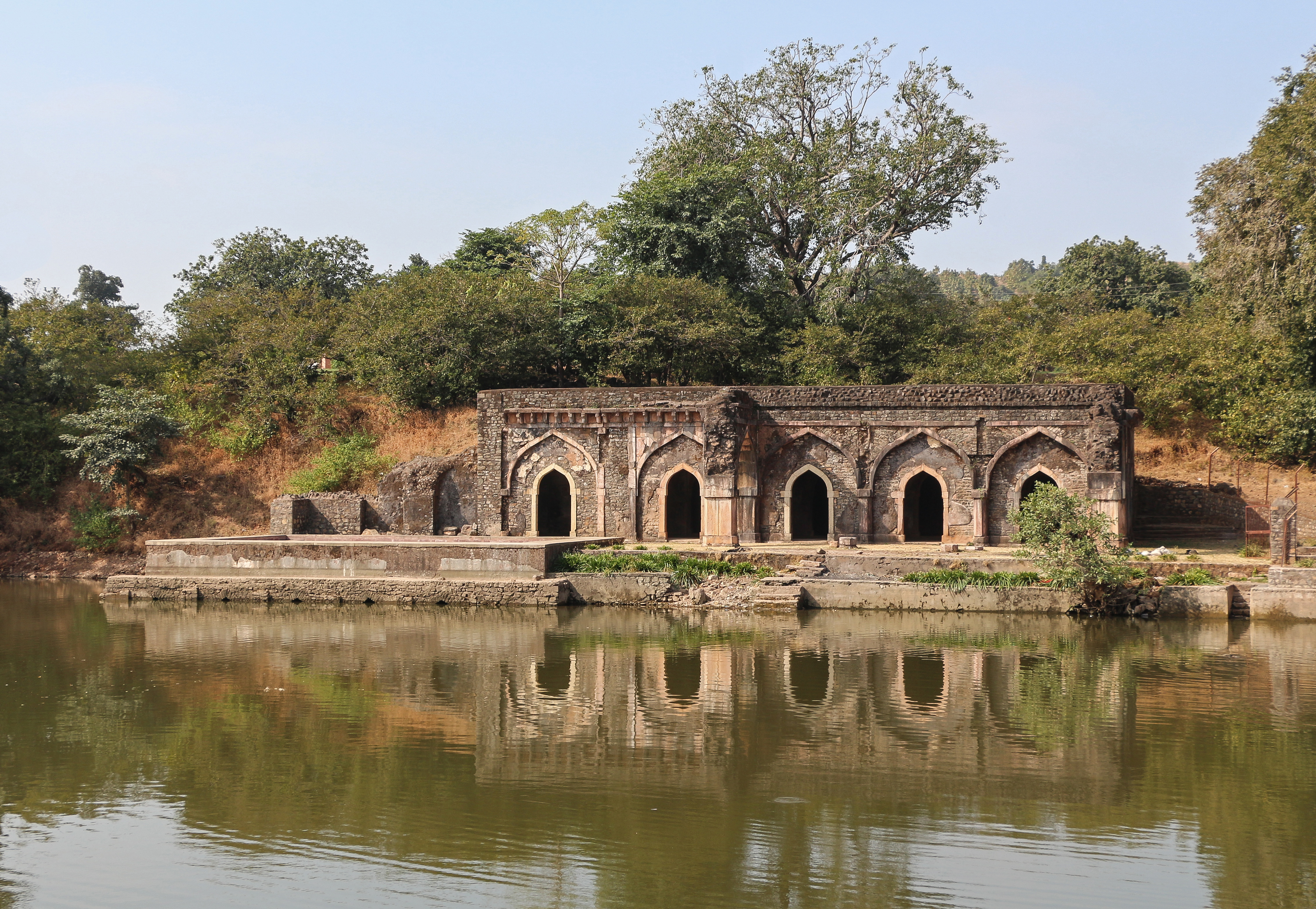
Rewa Kund - a reservoir that supplies water to Roopmati's Pavilion.

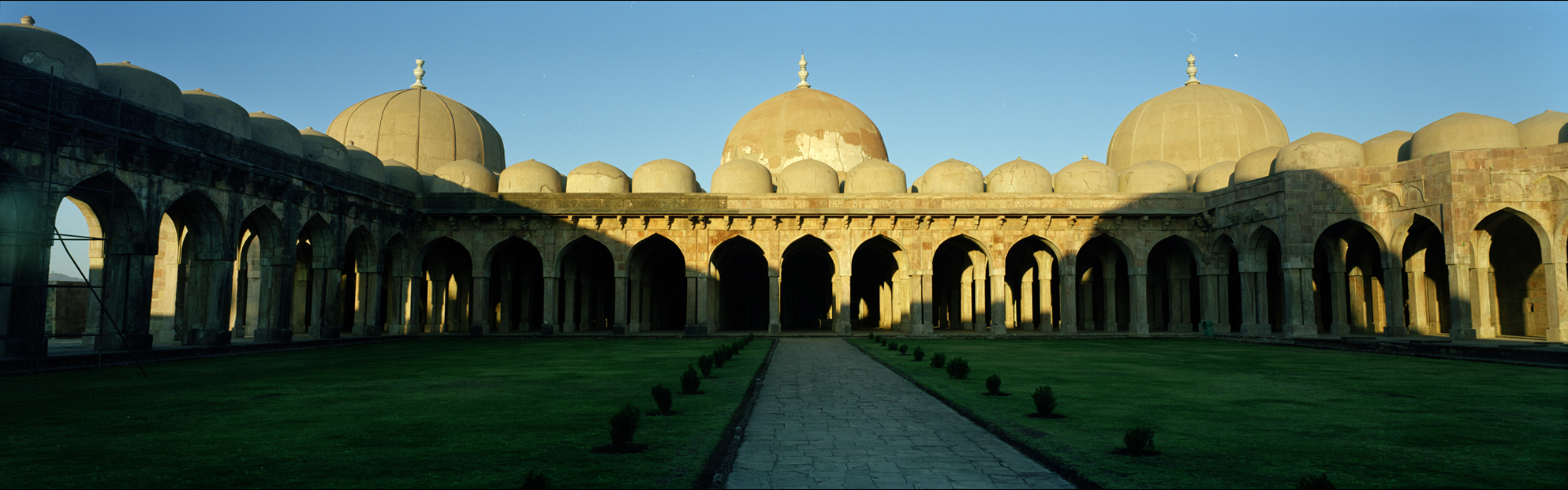
The courtyard of the Jami Masjid.

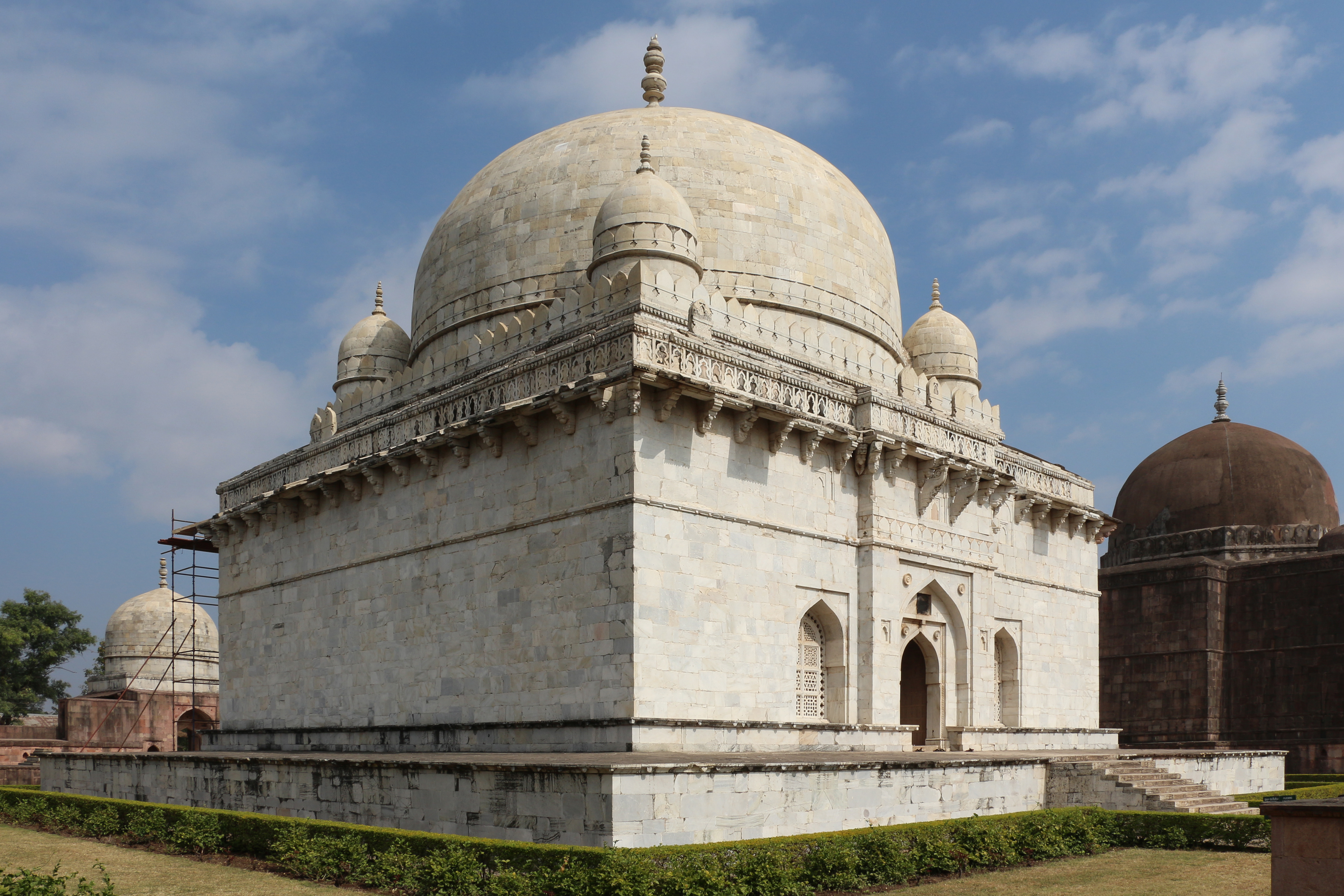
Mausoleum of Hoshang Shah

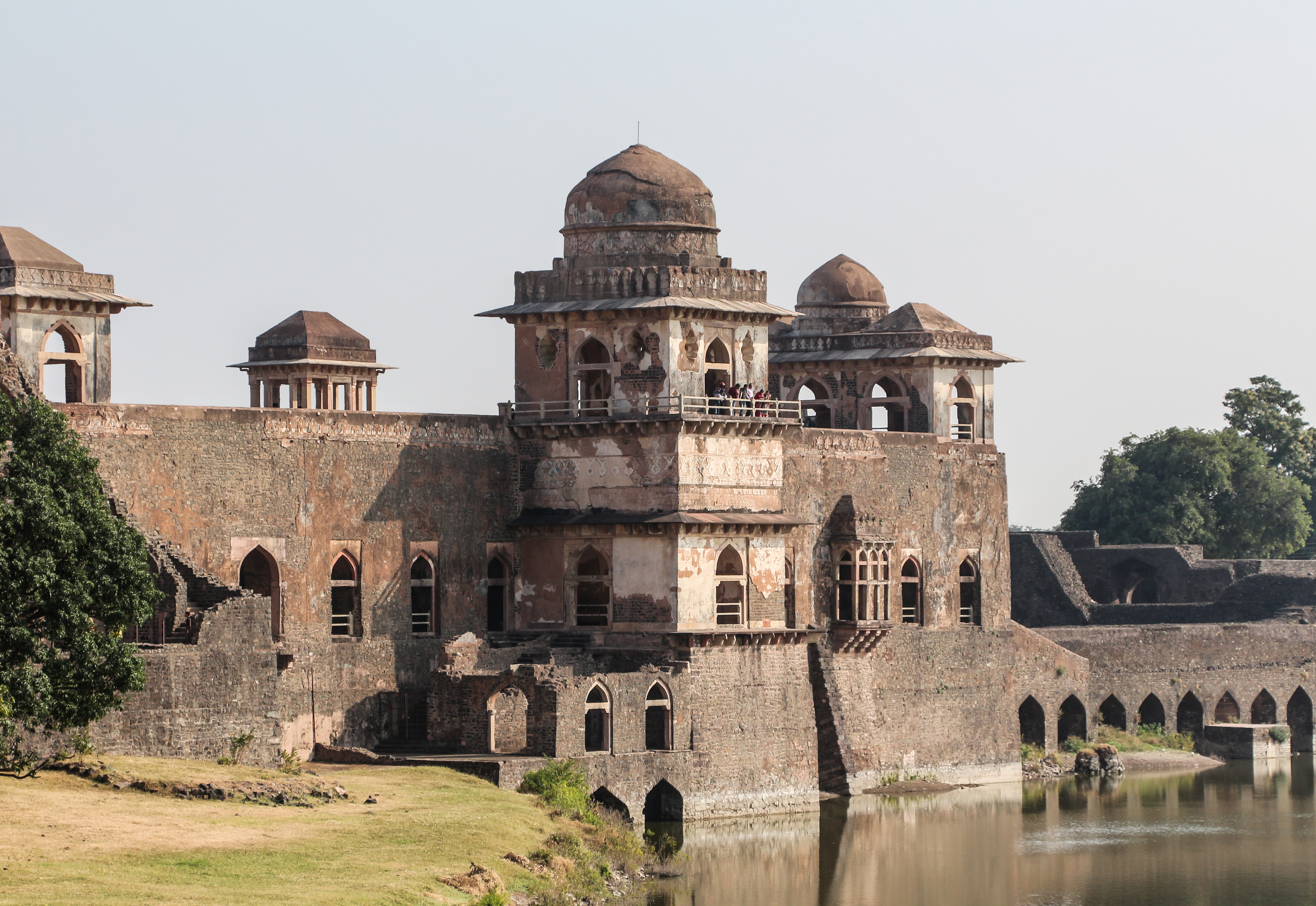
Jahaz Mahal

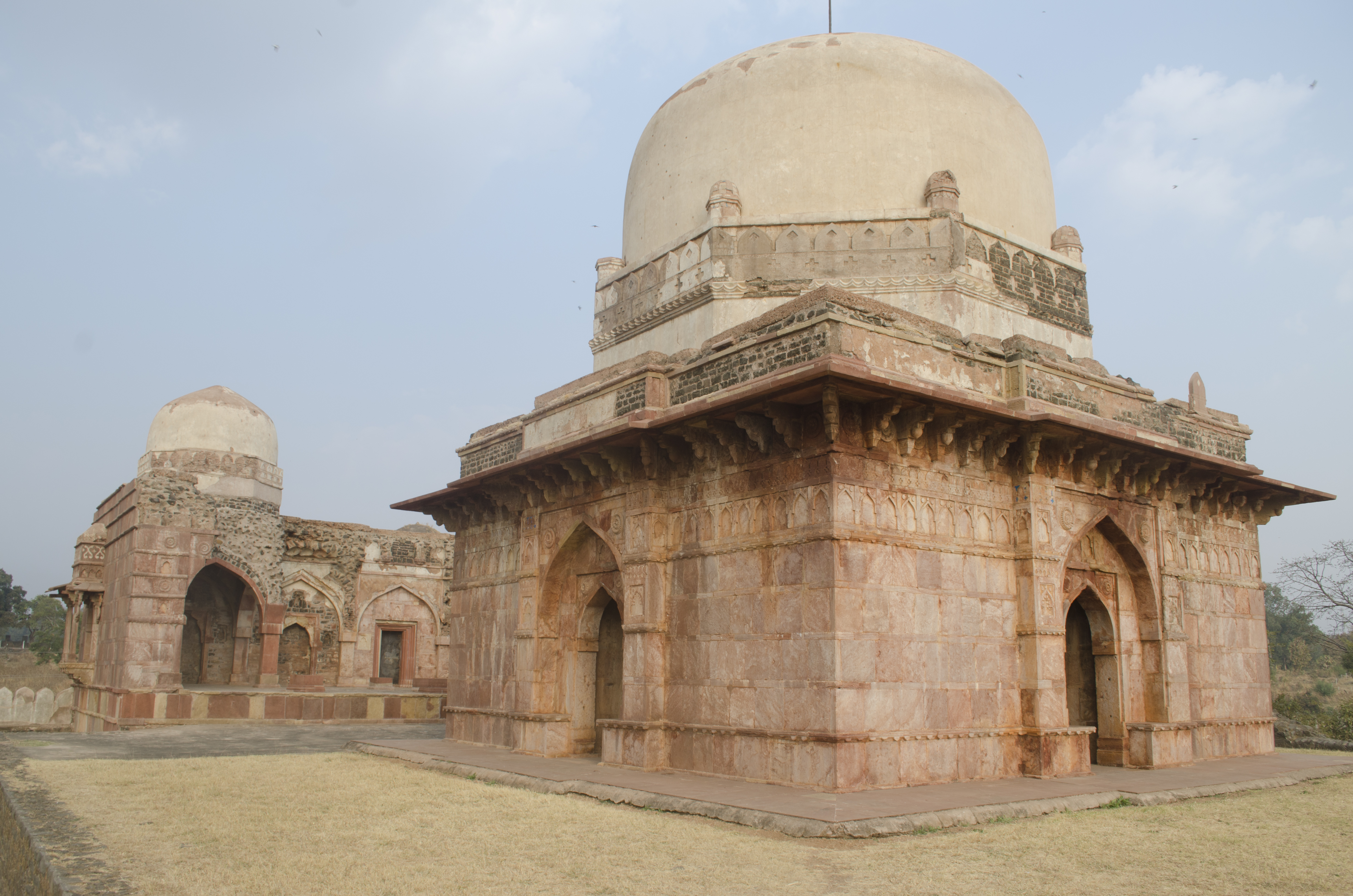
Dai ki Mahal

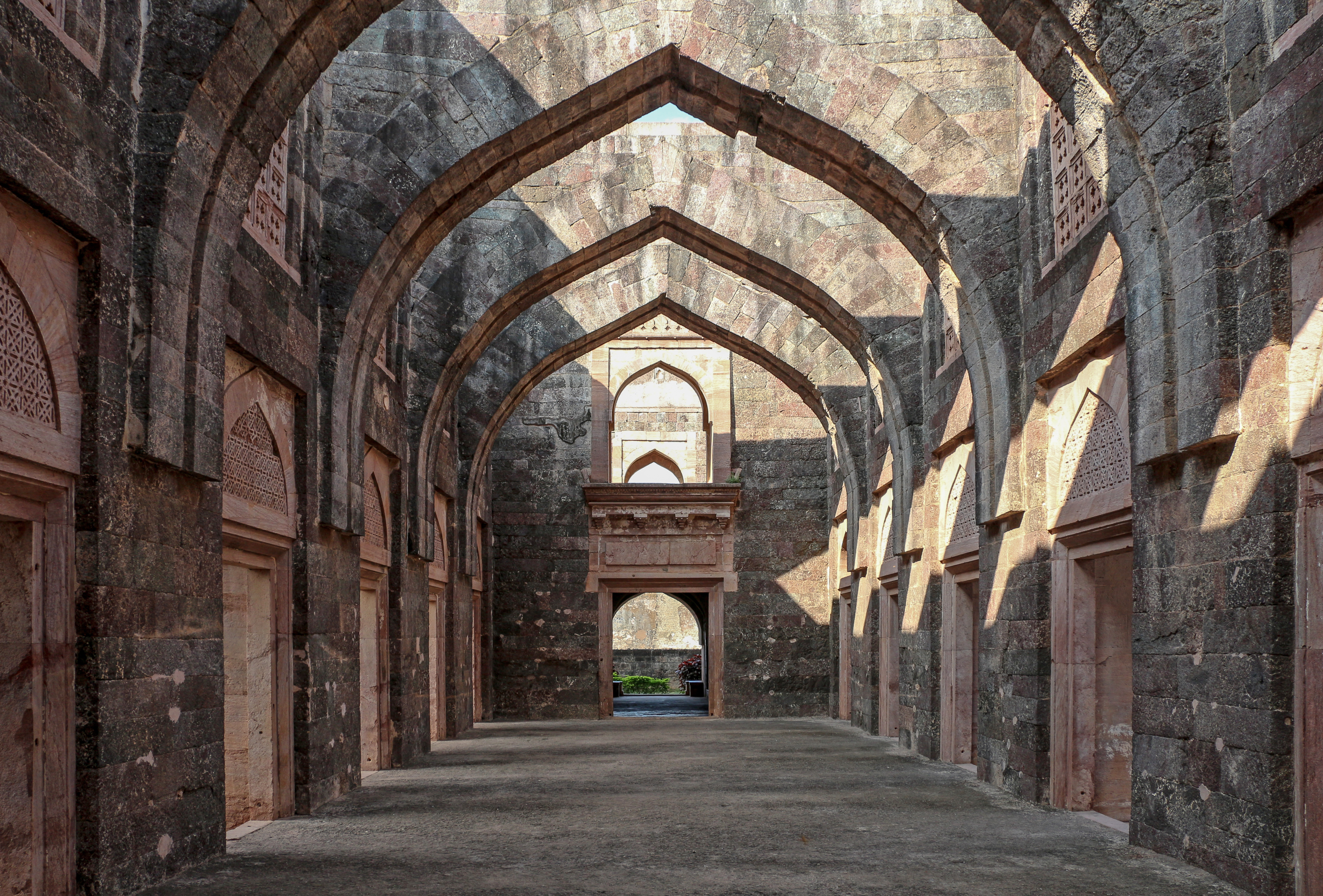
The arches of Hindola Mahal

An inscription discovered from Talanpur (around 100 km from Mandu) states that a merchant named Chandra Simha installed a statue in a temple of Parshvanatha located in the Mandapa Durg. While "Durg" means "Fort", the word "Mandu" is a Prakrit corruption of "mandapa", meaning "hall, temple". The inscription is dated 612 VS (555 CE), which indicates that Mandu was a flourishing town in 6th century.

Mandu gained prominence in 10th and 11th century under the Paramaras. The town of Mandu, situated at an elevation of 633 metres (2,079 feet), is perched on the Vindhya Range extending for 13 km (8.1 mi) while overlooking the plateau of Malwa to the north and the valley of the Narmada River to the south which acted as natural defences for the fort-capital the Paramaras. As "Mandapa-Durga", Mandu is mentioned as the royal residence in the inscriptions of the Paramara kings starting from Jayavarman II. It is possible that Jayavarman or his predecessor Jaitugi moved from the traditional Paramara capital Dhara to Mandu, because of attacks from the neighbouring kingdoms. Balban, the general of the Delhi's Sultan Nasir-ud-din, had reached the northern frontier of the Paramara territory by this time. Around the same time, the Paramaras also faced attacks from the Yadava emperor Krishna of Devgiri and the Vaghela king Visaladeva of Gujarat. Compared to Dhara, which is located in the plains, the hilly area of Mandu would have offered a better defensive position.

In 1305, the Muslim Sultan of Delhi Alauddin Khalji captured Malwa, the Paramara territory. Ayn al-Mulk Multani, the newly appointed Governor of Malwa, was sent to expel the Paramara king Mahalakadeva from Mandu and cleanse that place from "the odour of infidelity". With the help of a spy, Multani's forces found a way to enter the fort secretly. Mahalakadeva was killed while attempting to flee, on 24 November 1305.

When Timur captured Delhi in 1401, the Afghan Dilawar Khan, governor of Malwa, set up his own little kingdom and the Ghuri dynasty was established. His son, Hoshang Shah, shifted the capital from Dhar to Mandu and raised it to its greatest splendour. His son and third and last ruler of Ghuri dynasty, Mohammed, ruled for just one year until his poisoning by the militaristic Mohammed Khalji.

Mohammed Khalji established the Khalji dynasty of Malwa (1436-1531) and went on to rule for the next 33 years. However, it was under his reign that the Malwa Sultanate reached its greatest height. He was succeeded by his son, Ghiyas-ud-din, in 1469 and ruled for the next 31 years. He had a large harem and built the Jahaz Mahal for housing the women, numbering thousands. Ghiyas-ud-din was poisoned at age 80, by Nasir-ud-din, his son. In 1526, Mahmud II the sixth Khalji ruler made no resistance against the invading Bahadur Shah of Gujarat who conquered Mandu 28 March 1531. In 1530 Humayun, the second Mughal Emperor, succeeded Babur. Babur had established the Mughal dynasty. Humayun had two major rivals: Bahadur Shah of Gujarat and Sher Shah Suri. Humayun was engaged in a war with Sher Shah Suri when he learned of an imminent attack by Bahadur Shah of Gujarat who was being aided by the Portuguese. With an unusual swiftness Humayun attacked and defeated Bahadur Shah. Thus in 1534 Mandu came under Humayun's rule and he ordered large scale massacre of prisoners there. Humayun fancied Mandu so he relaxed here for a brief, peaceful interlude. Humayun lost the kingdom to Mallu Khan, an officer of the Khalji dynasty. Ten more years of feuds and invasions followed and in the end Baz Bahadur emerged on top.

By this time Humayun had been defeated by Sher Shah Suri and had fled India. Sher Shah Suri died in 1545 and his son Islam Shah died in 1553. Islam Shah's 12-year-old son Feroz Khan became the king but was killed by Adil Shah Suri within 3 days. Adil Shah appointed Hemu, also known as 'Hemof Army and Prime Minister. Hemu had a rapid rise during Sur regime. A grain supplier to Sher Shah Suri's army and then Chief of Intelligence or Daroga-i-Chowki (Superintendent of Post) under Islam Shah, he became the Prime Minister and Commander-in-Chief of the Afghan Army (Sher Shah Suri's army) under the reign of Adil Shah Suri. Adil Shah Suri was an incompetent ruler and many rebellions occurred against his rule. Hemu was sent to quell these rebellions. During this period Hemu attacked Mandu also and Baz Bahadur ran away from Mandu. Hemu appointed his own Governor here. During this period Humayun had returned to India and in 1555 was again the emperor. In 1556 Humayun died after falling while descending a staircase.

Hemu was in Bengal at the time and sensing an opportunity attacked Mughals. Soon Agra, Bihar, Eastern UP, Madhya Pradesh were all won and on 6 October 1556, he won Delhi, defeating Akbar's forces, and had his coronation at Purana Quila, the next day. Akbar come victorious and Hemu was killed in the second Battle of Panipat on 7 November 1556. In 1561, Akbar's army led by Adham Khan and Pir Muhammad Khan attacked Malwa and defeated Baz Bahadur in the battle of Sarangpur on 29 March 1561. One of the reasons for Adham Khan's attack seems to be his love for Rani Roopmati. Rani Roopmati poisoned herself to death on hearing the news of fall of Mandu. Baz Bahadur fled to Khandesh. Akbar, soon recalled Adham Khan and made over command to Pir Muhammad. Pir Muhammad attacked Khandesh and proceeded up to Burhanpur but he was defeated by a coalition of three powers: Miran Mubarak Shah II of Khandesh, Tufal Khan of Berar and Baz Bahadur. Pir Muhammad died while retreating. The confederate army pursued the Mughals and drove them out of Malwa. Baz Bahadur regained his kingdom for a short period. In 1562, Akbar sent another army led by Abdullah Khan, an Uzbeg which finally defeated Baz Bahadur. He fled to Chittor. Baz Bahadur remained a fugitive at a number of courts until he surrendered in November, 1570 to Akbar at Nagaur. He joined Akbar's service.

After Akbar added Mandu to the Mughal empire, it kept a considerable degree of independence, until taken by the Marathas in 1732 by Peshwa Baji Rao I. The capital of Malwa was then shifted back to Dhar by Marathas under Maharaja Pawar, re-establishing Hindu rule.

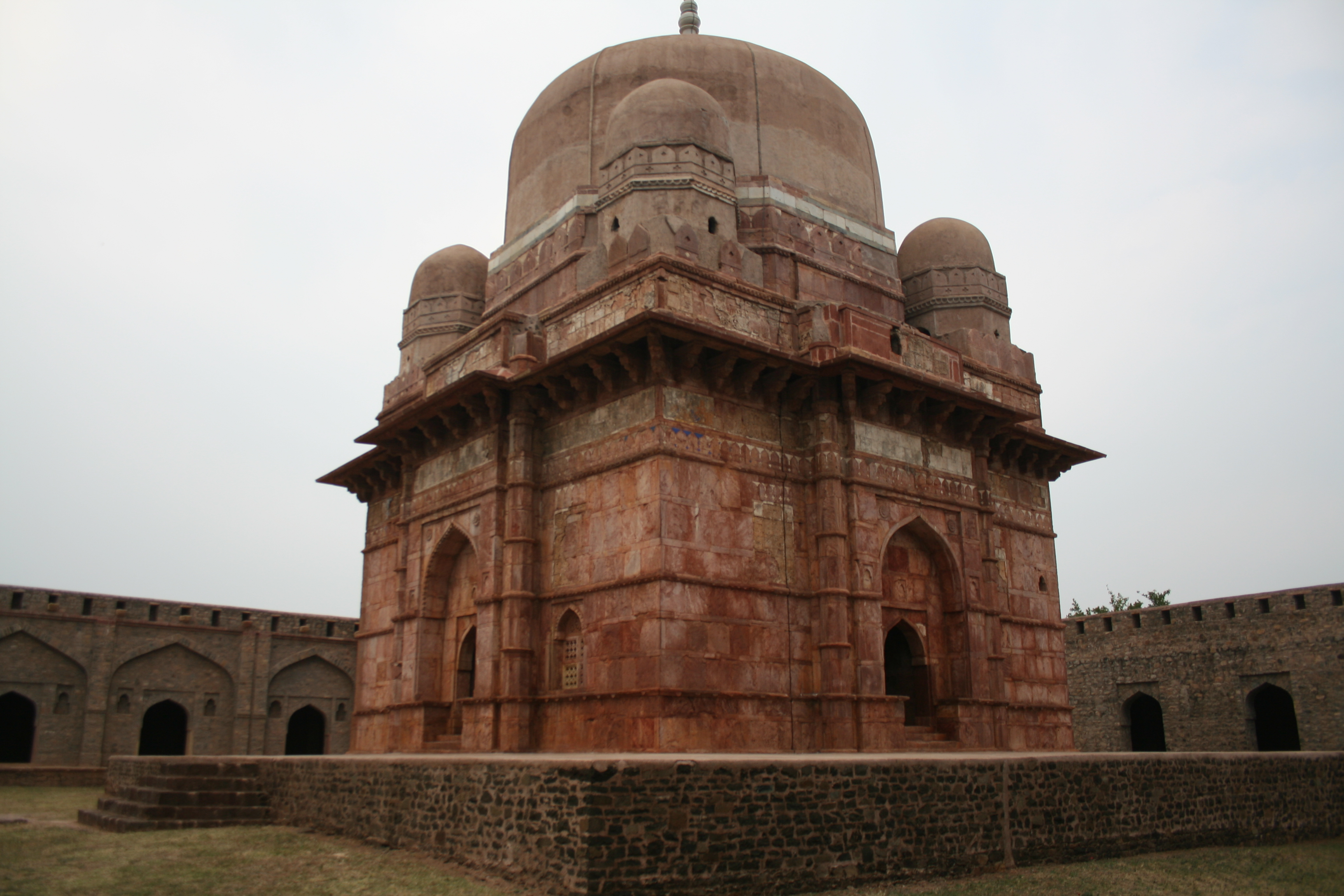
Darya khan Tomb

== Places of interest ==
Mandu, due to its strategic position and natural defences, was an important place with a rich and varied history. It was an important military outpost and its military past can be gauged by the circuit of the battlemented wall, which is nearly 37 km (23 mi) and is punctuated by 12 gateways. The wall encloses a large number of palaces, mosques, Jain temples of 14th century and other buildings. The oldest mosque dates from 1405; the finest is the Jama Masjid or great mosque, a notable example of Pashtun architecture. The marble-domed tomb of this ruler is also magnificent.

Some of the notable places, listed in South to North direction are:

Roopmati's Pavilion A large sandstone structure originally built as an army observation post it is known today as Roopmati's Pavilion. Rani Roopmati - the love interest of Baaz Bahadur lived here and is said to have gazed at the Baz Bahadur's Palace - situated below and also at Narmada river, flowing through the Nimar plains far below, a river which the queen revered.

Baz Bahadur's Palace Built by Baz Bahadur, this 16th-century structure is famous for its large courtyards encompassed by large halls and high terraces. It is situated below Roopmati's Pavilion and can be seen from the pavilion.

Rewa Kund A reservoir constructed by Baz Bahadur for the purpose of supplying water to Rani Roopmati's Pavilion. The reservoir is situated below the pavilion and hence is considered an architectural marvel.

Darya Khan's Tomb complex

Darya Khan was a minister in the court of Mahmud Khalji II, and his tomb lies in a walled complex along with another tomb, a mosque, a pond, and an inn. At the centre of the complex is the massive sandstone tomb of Darya Khan. Hathi Paga Mahal or Elephant Leg Palace is located on the south-eastern side of the Darya Khan Complex, and is crowned with a massive dome.

Shri Mandavagadh Teerth

Shri Mandavagadh Teerth is dedicated to Lord Suparshvanatha. It belongs to Shwetambar sect of Jainism. The temple has been attractively constructed and looks exquisite. It underwent expansion in 14th century. The idol of Lord Suparshvanath is believed to be much older. The idol is white in complexion and is 91.54 cm (3 feet) in height. It is seated in a padmansana posture. Apart from this in this same fort there is a fine temple of smaller size of Lord Shantinath. Ruins of many temples and idols can be seen here. As per a reference once there were almost 700 Jain temples here.

Jami Masjid Inspired by the great mosque of Damascus, this enormous structure is striking in both its simplicity and architectural style-with large courtyards and grand entrances. At the front of Jaami Mosque, there are ruins of Asharfi Palace. There is a seven-story winning memorial at the north-east of the palace, and also a fascinating Ram Temple nearby, which was built by Maharani Sakarwar Bai Pawar in 1769 CE.

Hoshang Shah's Tomb India's first marble structure, it is one of the most refined examples of Afghan architecture. Its unique features include the beautifully proportioned dome, intricate marble lattice work and porticoed courts and towers. It served as a template for the construction of Taj Mahal.

Jahaz Mahal/Ship Palace Situated between two artificial lakes, this two-storied building is so named as it appears as a ship floating in water. Built by Sultan Ghiyas-ud-din-Khalji, it served as a harem for the sultan. This is The Water Palace shown in Fisher's Drawing Room Scrap Book, 1832, from a painting by Copley Fielding together with a poetical illustration by Letitia Elizabeth Landon. Apart from its architecture, Jahaz Mahal is also a venue for the Mandu festival. This includes a series of adventure activities, music shows, lights, and balloon festivals that happen every year in the winter season. A sound and light show at the Jahaz Mahal is another event.

Hindola Mahal Hindola Mahal - meaning Swing palace is so named due to its sloping side walls. The Hindola Mahal might have been constructed during the reign of Hushang Shah about 1425 C.E. but may date to the end of the 15th century during the reign of Ghiyas al-Din. It is one of a set buildings making up the royal palace complex at Mandu, which consists of the Jahaz Mahal, the Hindola Mahal, the Taveli Mahal, and the Nahar Jharokha. The Hindola Mahal may have been used as an audience chamber.

The Darwazas (Gates)

The wall encompassing Mandu has 12 major darwazas or gates. The present road, through which Mandu is reached passes through many of these. Also encountered are smaller gateways built to provide protection to the above-mentioned 12 gates.

Songarh/ Sonergarh Fort: The fort was once an impregnable citadel and part of the historic hillfort of Mandu, now in ruins, which stands in a spectacular, naturally-defended position on a plateau of the Vindhya hills surrounded by a ravine. The citadel is separated from the main hill by a narrow neck of land.

== Transport ==
The nearest airport is Indore.

=== Sunset Point ===
This a lovely gorge on the way to the fort from Dhar. In monsoon, one can see a lovely waterfalls cascading from the rocks.

=== Sagar Talab ===
Sagar Talab is a beautiful man made lake inside the fort.

== In popular culture ==
- A major part of the 1977 Bollywood movie Kinara and its song "Naam Gum Jaayegaa" were shot in Mandu. Another film Rani Rupmati (1959), was also based on this city.

== Gallery ==
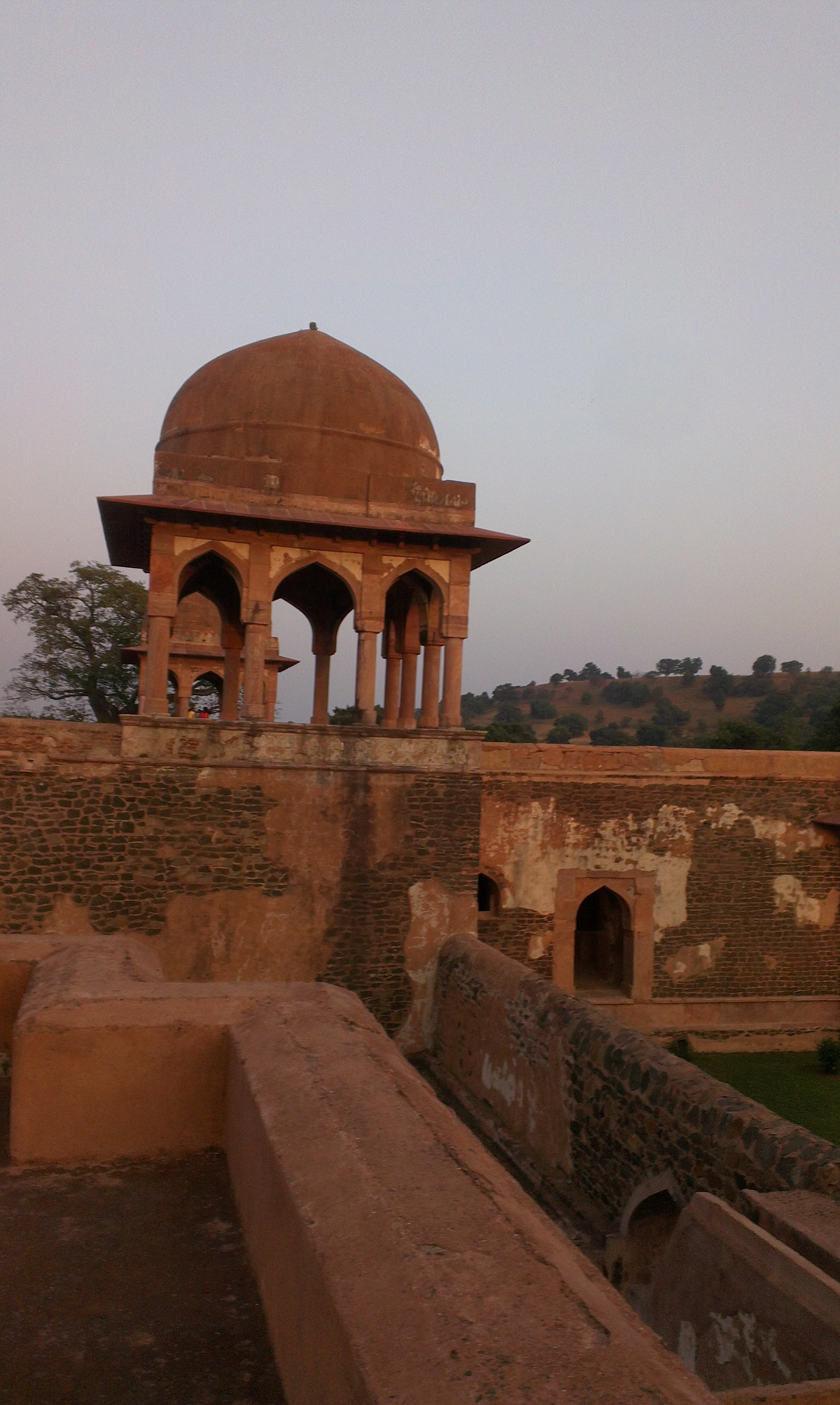
Palace at Mandu

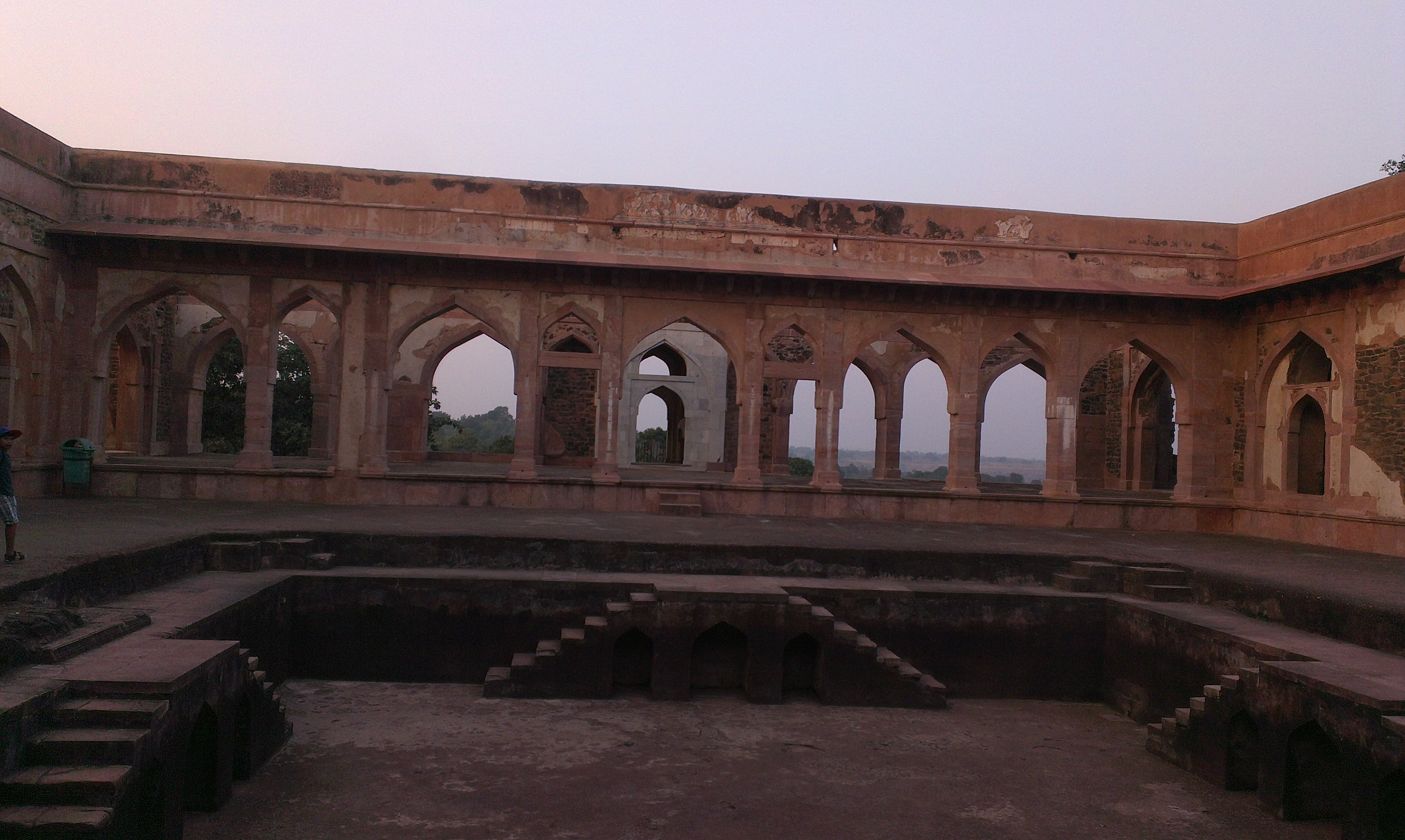
Palace at Mandu

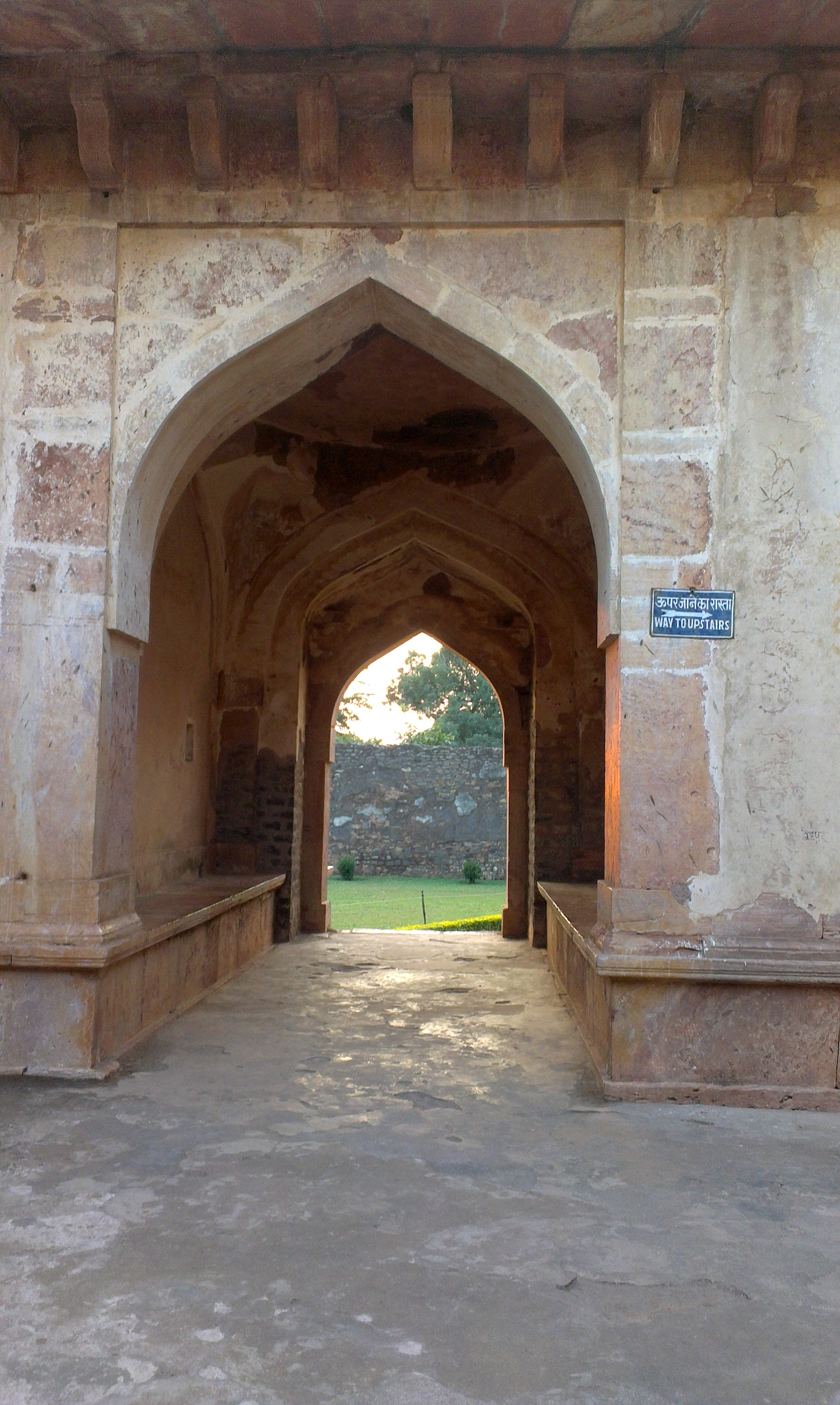
Palace at Mandu

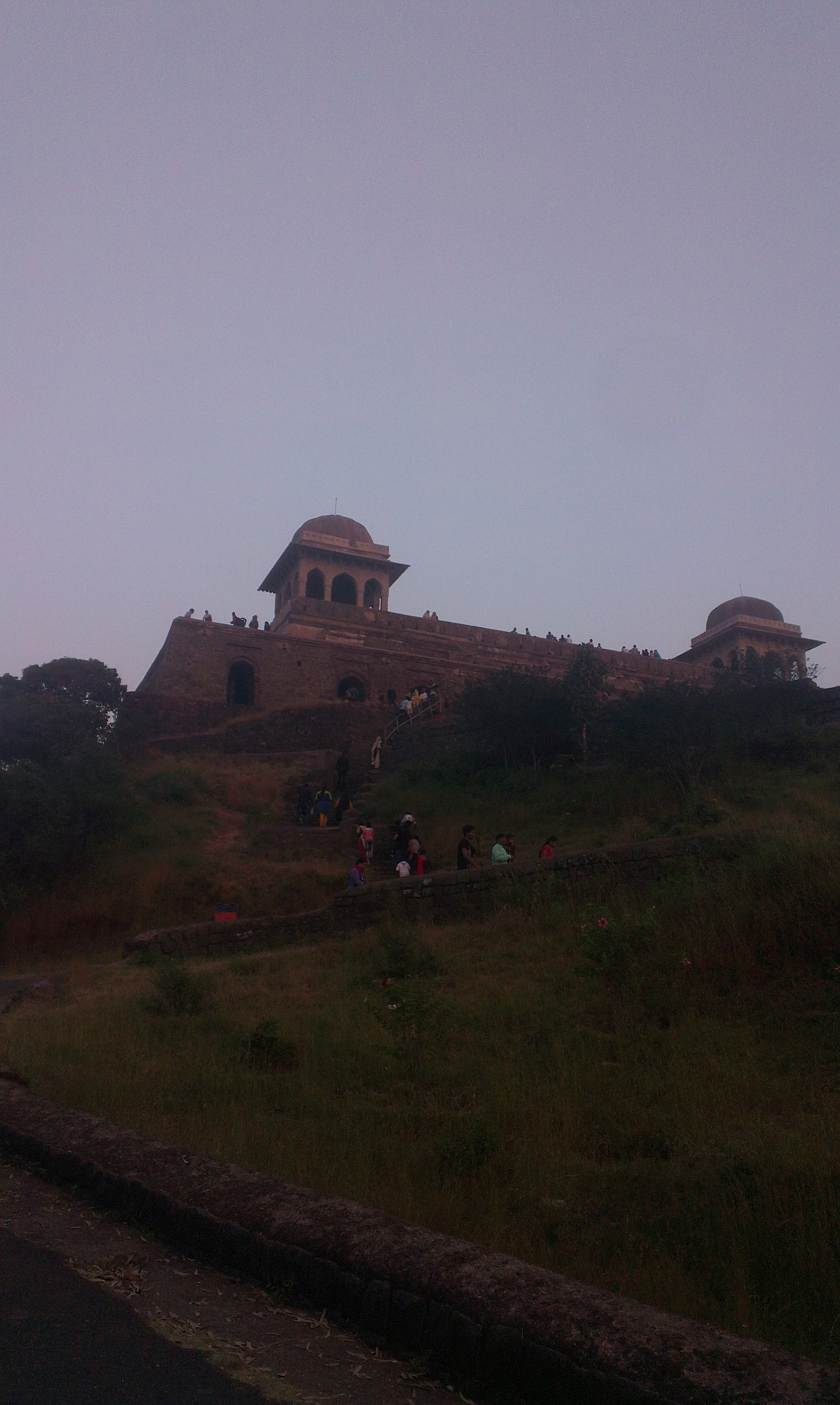
Rupmati palace, Mandav

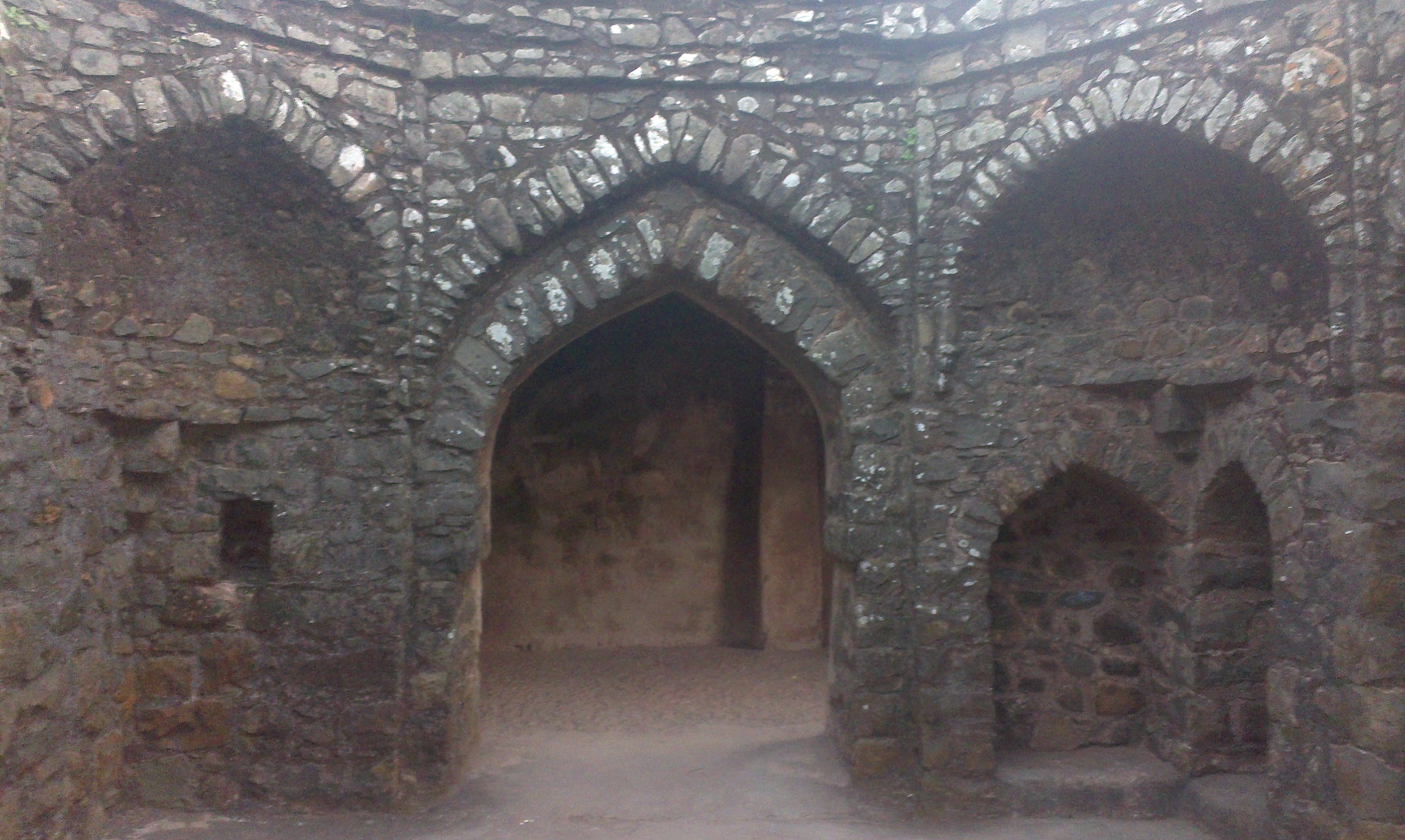
Rupmati palace, Mandu

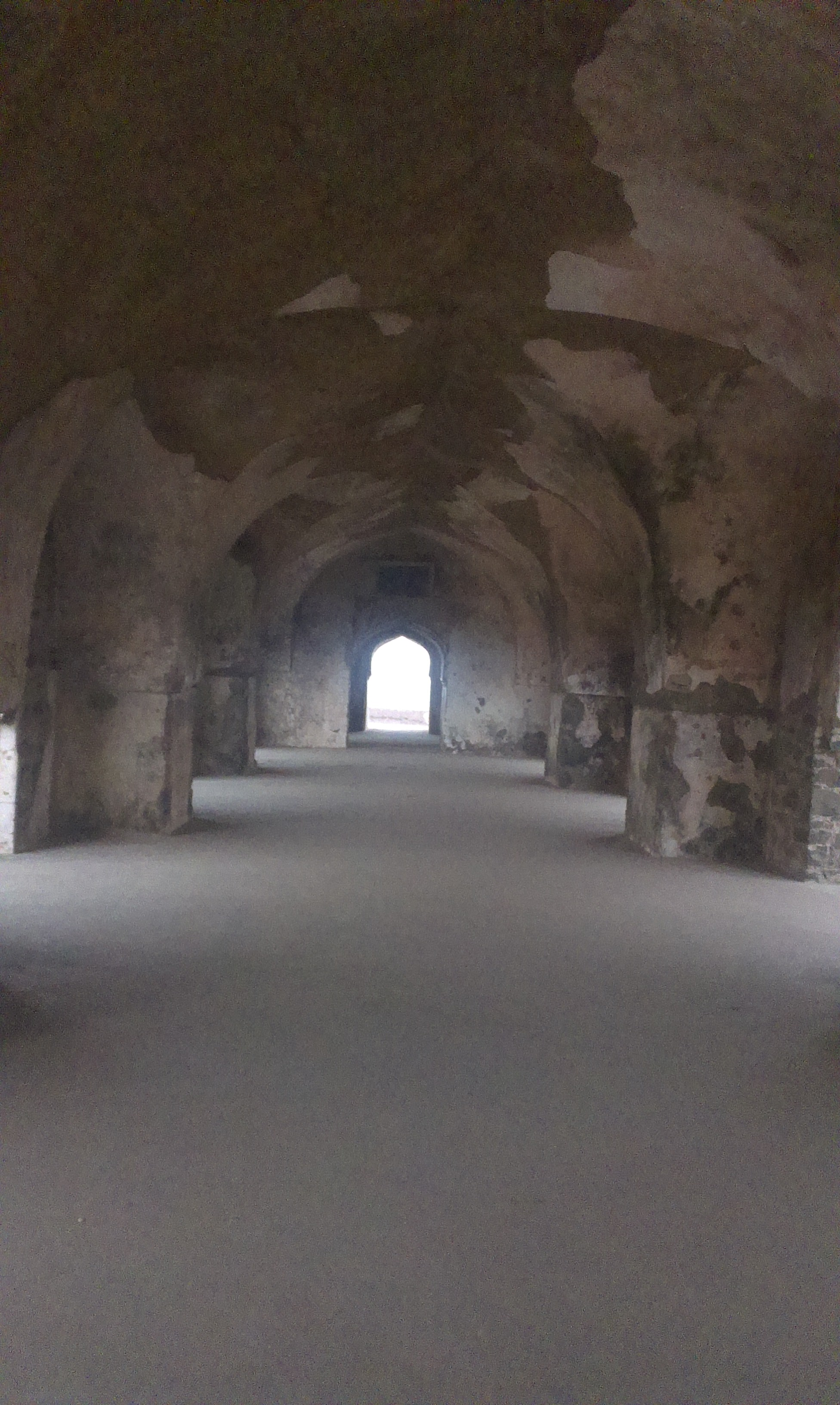
Rupmati palace, Mandu

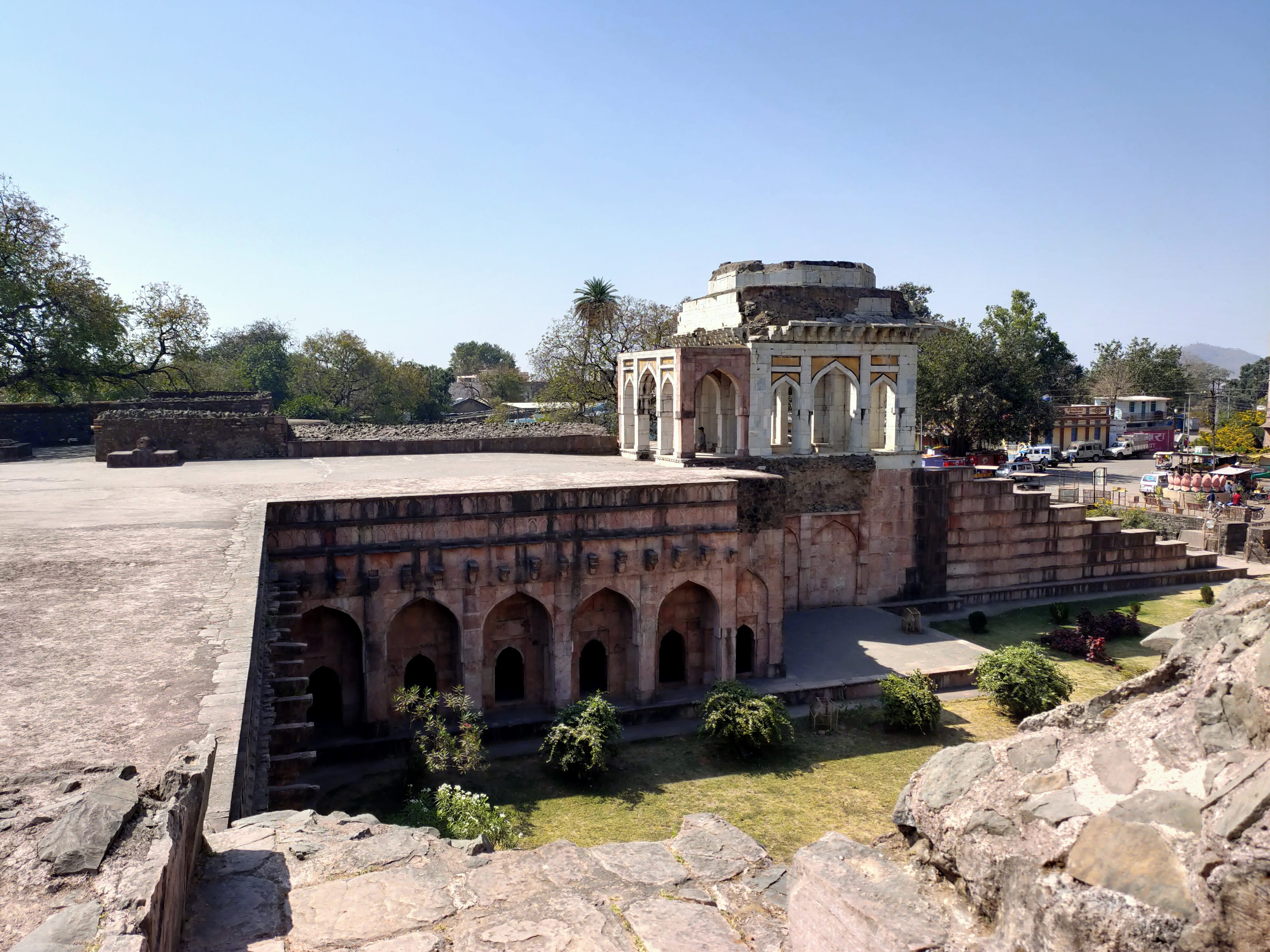
Asharfi Mahal-Mandu-Madhya Pradesh

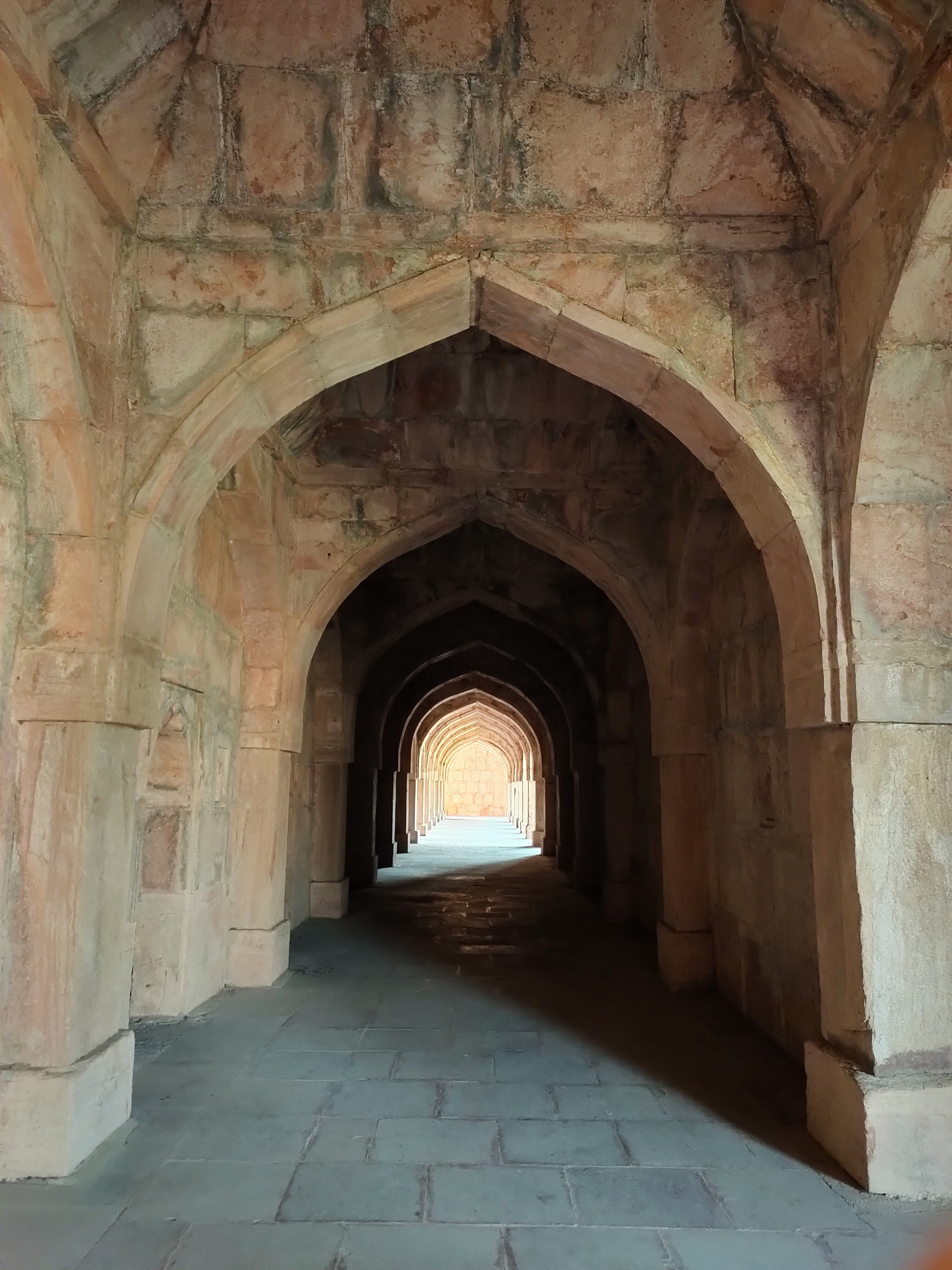
Asharfi Mahal-Mandu-Madhya Pradesh
