= Arjunavarman II =

King of Malwa from 1275 to 1283

- Maharajadhiraja

King of Malwa
- Reign: 1275 CE - 1283 CE
- Predecessor: Jayavarman II
- Successor: Bhoja II
- Pradhan: Goga deva
Regnal name
- Arjunavarman
- Dynasty: Paramara
- Father: Jayavarman II
- Religion: Hinduism

Arjunavarman II, also known as Arjuna, was a king of the Paramara dynasty in central India. He ruled in the Malwa region, in second half of the 13th century CE, during 1270s and 1280s.

Arjuna II succeeded Jayavarman II (alias Jayasimha), and proved to be a weak ruler. After Jayasimha's death around 1275 CE, the Paramara minister rebelled against his king. This fact has been mentioned by the Muslim historian Wassaf, who does not name the king or the minister. The minister was probably Goga.

In the 1270s, Ramachandra, the Yadava king of Devagiri invaded Malwa. The Udari inscription of Ramachandra, issued in 1276 CE, states that the Yadava king was "a lion in destroying the multitude of the rutting elephants of Arjuna".

in the 1280s, the Ranthambore Chahamana ruler Hammira also raided Malwa. The Balvan inscription of 1288 CE mentions that Hammira captured the elephant force of Arjuna.

Jain poet Nayachandra Suri's Hammira Mahakavya states that Hammira defeated Arjuna of Sarasapura and Bhoja of Dhara. Based on this, R. C. Majumdar concluded that Hammira must have invaded Malwa twice: once during the reign of Arjuna II, and again, during the reign of his successor Bhoja II. Pratipal Bhatia theorizes that Arjuna II's minister Goga-deva put Bhoja II on the throne of the Paramara capital Dhara as a titular king, while Arjuna II continued to controlled another part of the kingdom.
