= Bhoja II of Malwa =

Bhoja II

King of Malwa
- Reign: late 13th century
- Predecessor: Arjunavarman II
- Successor: Mahalakadeva
- Pradhan: Goga deva
Regnal name
- Bhoja
- Dynasty: Paramara
- Father: Possibly Jayavarman II
- Religion: Hinduism

Bhoja II was a 13th-century king of the Paramara dynasty in central India. He succeeded Arjuna II as the king of Dhara in Malwa region.

According to Hammira Mahakavya, written by the Jain poet Nayachandra Suri, the Chahmana ruler Hammira defeated Arjuna of Sarasapura and Bhoja of Dhara. Based on this, R. C. Majumdar concluded that Hammira must have invaded Malwa twice: once during the reign of Arjuna II, and again, during the reign of Bhoja II. Because Hammira ascended the Chauhan throne during 1282–83, Bhoja must have ascended the Paramara throne sometime after 1283 CE.

Pratipal Bhatia, on the other hand, speculates that Arjuna II's minister Goga-deva rebelled against him, and put Bhoja II on the throne of Dhara as a titular king. The 16th-century historian Firishta describes Goga as the "Raja of Malwa". According to Bhatia's theory, Goga-deva became the de facto independent ruler of one part of the Paramara kingdom, while Arjuna II continued to control another part.

Bhoja II was succeeded by Mahlakadeva.
