= Alauddin Khalji's conquest of Malwa =

1305 Dehli victory in India

Delhi Sultanate annexation of Malwa
Date	1305 – 23 November 1305
Location	Malwa
Result	Delhi Sultanate victory: End of Paramara Dynasty
Territorial changes	Malwa annexed by Delhi Sultanate

Belligerents
Delhi Sultanate	Paramara dynasty

Commanders and leaders
Alauddin Khalji; Ayn al-Mulk Multani	Mahalakadeva †; Gogadeva †

Strength
10,000	40,000 Cavalry; 100,000 Infantry

Delhi and Mandu in present-day India

In 1305, the Delhi Sultanate ruler Alauddin Khalji sent an army to capture the Paramara kingdom of Malwa in central India. The Delhi army defeated and killed the powerful Paramara minister Goga, while the Paramara king Mahalakadeva took shelter in the Mandu fort. Alauddin appointed Ayn al-Mulk Multani as the governor of Malwa. After consolidating his power in Malwa, Ayn al-Mulk besieged Mandu and killed Mahalakadeva.

== Background ==
The Paramara dynasty ruled the Malwa region in central India. By 1305, nearly all the Indian rulers to the north of Malwa had acknowledged Alauddin's suzerainty. The Paramara king Mahalakadeva was a weak ruler, and his prime minister (pradhan) Goga (called Koka in Muslim chronicles) was more powerful than him.

== Goga's death ==
In 1305, Alauddin sent a cavalry to capture Malwa. It is not clear who commanded this army, but he might have been Ayn al-Mulk Multani, whom Alauddin later appointed as the governor of Malwa. According to the Delhi chronicler Amir Khusrau, the Delhi army comprised 10,000 soldiers, who had been selected specifically for the mission.

According to Khusrau, the Malwa army commanded by Goga comprised a 30,000-40,000 strong cavalry and an "innumerable" infantry. The later historians Yahya, Firishta, and Hajiuddabir state that the Malwa army comprised 40,000 cavalry and 100,000 infantry.

In the ensuing battle, the Delhi army emerged victorious. Khusrau states that the battlefield was "bloody with mud" as far as the human eye could see. Goga's horse was caught in a mire, and he was killed by arrows. His head was sent to Delhi, where it was trampled under the feet of horses at the palace gates.

Alauddin appointed Ayn al-Mulk as the governor of Malwa. Ayn al-Mulk raided the former Paramara capital Dhara, where he broke the Dhar iron pillar. The former Paramara vassals were forced to recognize Alauddin's suzerainty. These included the chiefs of the Ujjain, Dhar, and Chanderi cities. Ayn al-Mulk sent a detailed record of his success to Delhi, where a week-long celebration was held and sweets were distributed among public for the entire week.

== Mahalakadeva's death ==
After the establishment of peace in a large part of Malwa, Ayn al-Mulk marched to Mandu, where the Paramara king Mahalakadeva stayed. Mahalakadeva sent an army led by his son to fight the invaders. Mahalakadeva's army was defeated and his son killed on the battlefield. The Delhi army besieged Mandu, and managed to enter it, after one of Mahalakadeva's fort guards betrayed him. The guard told the invaders about a secret entrance to the fort. Using this passage, the Delhi army entered the Mandu fort at night, taking Mahalakadeva by surprise.

Mahalakadeva fled to a spring called Sar (Chashm-i Sar in the Delhi chronicles), where he was killed. The Delhi army captured the fort on 23 November 1305, and Alauddin assigned it to Ayn al-Mulk. An inscription from Udaipur indicates that the Paramara dynasty survived in the north-eastern part of Malwa in 1310. However, this area had also come under the Delhi Sultanate rule by the Tughluq period in 1338.
