= Devapala (Paramara dynasty) =

- Parama-bhattaraka Maharajadhiraja Parameshvara

King of Malwa
- Reign: c. 1218 – c. 1239 CE
- Predecessor: Arjunavarman
- Successor: Jaitugi
- Issue: Jaitugi; Jayavarman II
Regnal name
- Devapala
- Dynasty: Paramara
- Father: Harishchandra ( a chief of Paramara branch)
- Religion: Hinduism

Devapala (reigned c. 1218–1239 CE) was an Indian king from the Paramara dynasty, who ruled in the Malwa region of central India.

== Early life ==
Devapāla succeeded the Paramara king Arjunavarman, but he was not the king's son. He was the son of a Mahakumara (chief of a Paramara branch of Bhopal principality) named Harishchandra and great grandson of Paramara king Yashovarman. He also became the Mahakumara after the death of his elder brother Udayavarman.

== Military career ==
Find spots of Devapala's inscriptions

The Paramaras' struggles with the Chaulukyas (Solankis) and the Yadavas of Devagiri continued during Devapala's reign. The Yadava king Simhana invaded Lata, and defeated the Paramara feudatory Samgramasimha.

According to the 13th century Muslim historians, the Sultan of Delhi Iltutmish captured Bhilsa during 1233-34 CE (AH 632), and destroyed the Bhailasvamin Hindu temple. The 1274 CE inscription of Devapala's son Jayavarman II states that Devapala killed a mleccha adhipa (possibly the Muslim governor of the Delhi Sultanate) near the city of Bhailasvamin. A 1263 CE inscription issued during Jayavarman's reign was also found at Bhilsa. This indicates that Devapala recaptured Bhilsa.

== Death ==
When Vagabhata of Ranthambhor was defeated by Iltumish, Devapala gave him asylum. According to the Hammira Mahakavya of the Jain writer Nayachandra Suri, Vagabhata suspected Devapala of plotting his murder on behalf of the Delhi Sultan. Therefore, Vagabhata killed Devapala and gained control of the Malwa territory.

Devapala's son Jaitugi succeeded him as the Paramara king.

== Inscriptions ==
A 1218 CE inscription issued during Devapala's reign has been found at Harsud (or Harsauda). It records the construction of a Shiva temple by a merchant named Keshava. The 1225 CE Mandhata inscription of Devapala records the grant of a village to Brahmins. His 1229 CE and 1232 CE Udaipur inscriptions record the donation of land to temples.

Devapala's 1218 CE and 1232 CE inscriptions give his title as Parama-bhattaraka Maharajadhiraja Parameshvara. The 1218 CE Harsud inscription also calls him a Mahakumara. The 1225 CE Mandhata inscription gives his title as Maharaja.

== See also ==
First battle of Bhilsa
Second battle of Bhilsa
