= Mahalakadeva =

King of Malwa until 1305

- Maharajadhiraja

King of Malwa
- Reign: late 13th century – 24 November 1305
- Predecessor: Bhoja II
- Successor: Position abolished
- Pradhan: Goga Deva
- Died: 24 November 1305; Mandu, Malwa (Present day Mandu, Madhya Pradesh, India)
- Issue: One son killed in battle
- Dynasty: Paramara
- Father: Possibly Jayavarman II
- Religion: Hinduism

Mahālakadeva (died 24 November 1305), also known as Mahlak Deo or Mahlak Deva, was a king of the Paramara dynasty in central India. The last known ruler of the dynasty, he was defeated and killed by the forces of Alauddin Khalji of Delhi.

== Political status ==
Mahalakadeva was the successor of Bhoja II. Gogadeva, also known as Haranand or simply Goga, was his powerful pradhan (prime minister). Goga was also the prime minister of Bhoja II's predecessor Arjuna II, and had turned against the king. The 16th-century historian Firishta describes Goga as the "Raja of Malwa". According to historian Pratipal Bhatia, Goga might have become the de facto administrator of Malwa, with Bhoja II as a titular ruler.

== Defeat against Alauddin Khalji ==
Delhi and Mandu in present-day India

In 1305, the Muslim Sultan of Delhi Alauddin Khalji sent his army to conquer Malwa, the Paramara territory. According to Amir Khusrow's Tarikh-i 'Alai, "Rai Mahlak Deo" and pradhan "Koka" (Goga) commanded a force of 30-40 thousand cavalry, and an infantry of unknown size. Khusrow states that Delhi's "army of Islam" defeated this Paramara force, and "the earth was moistened with Hindu blood". Goga was killed in the battle, and his head was sent to the Sultan in Delhi.

Ayn al-Mulk Multani, the newly appointed Governor of Malwa, was sent to expel Mahalakadeva from Mandu and cleanse that place from "the odour of infidelity". With help of a spy, Multani's forces found a way to enter the fort secretly. Mahalakadeva was killed while attempting to flee, on 24 November 1305. The Jain writer Kakka Suri, in his Nabhi-nandana-jinoddhara-prabandha (1336), describes the end of Mahalakadeva as follows: "Besieged by him [Alauddin] in his own fort, the ruler of Mālwā passed there many days, living like a captive, and then died bereft of heroism."

It is not known when exactly did the Delhi forces completed their conquest of Malwa. A 1310 CE Udaipur inscription indicates that the Paramara dynasty survived until this time, at least in the north-eastern part of Malwa. A later 1338 CE inscription on a new mosque indicates that the area was under the control of the Delhi Sultan Muhammad bin Tughluq by this time.
