= Jaitugideva =

Jaitugi
- Bala-Narayana

King of Malwa
- Reign: c. 1239 – c. 1255 CE
- Predecessor: Devapala
- Successor: Jayavarman II
- Dynasty: Paramara

Jaitugi-deva (reigned c. 1239-1255 CE) was an Indian king from the Paramara dynasty, who ruled in the Malwa region of central India.

Jaitugi succeeded his father Devapala as the Paramara king. He assumed the title Bala-Narayana. No inscriptions from Jaitugi's reign have been discovered. He is known from the inscriptions of his younger brother and his successor Jayavarman II. The works of the poet of Ashadhara also mention him.

During his reign, Malwa faced invasions from the Yadava king Krishna, the Delhi Sultan Balban, and the Vaghela prince Visala-deva. These raids significantly weakened the Paramara power. According to the Vaghela inscriptions, Visala-deva sacked the Paramara capital Dhara, and extracted tribute from its ruler.
