= Hammiradeva =

King of Ranastambhapura from 1283 to 1301

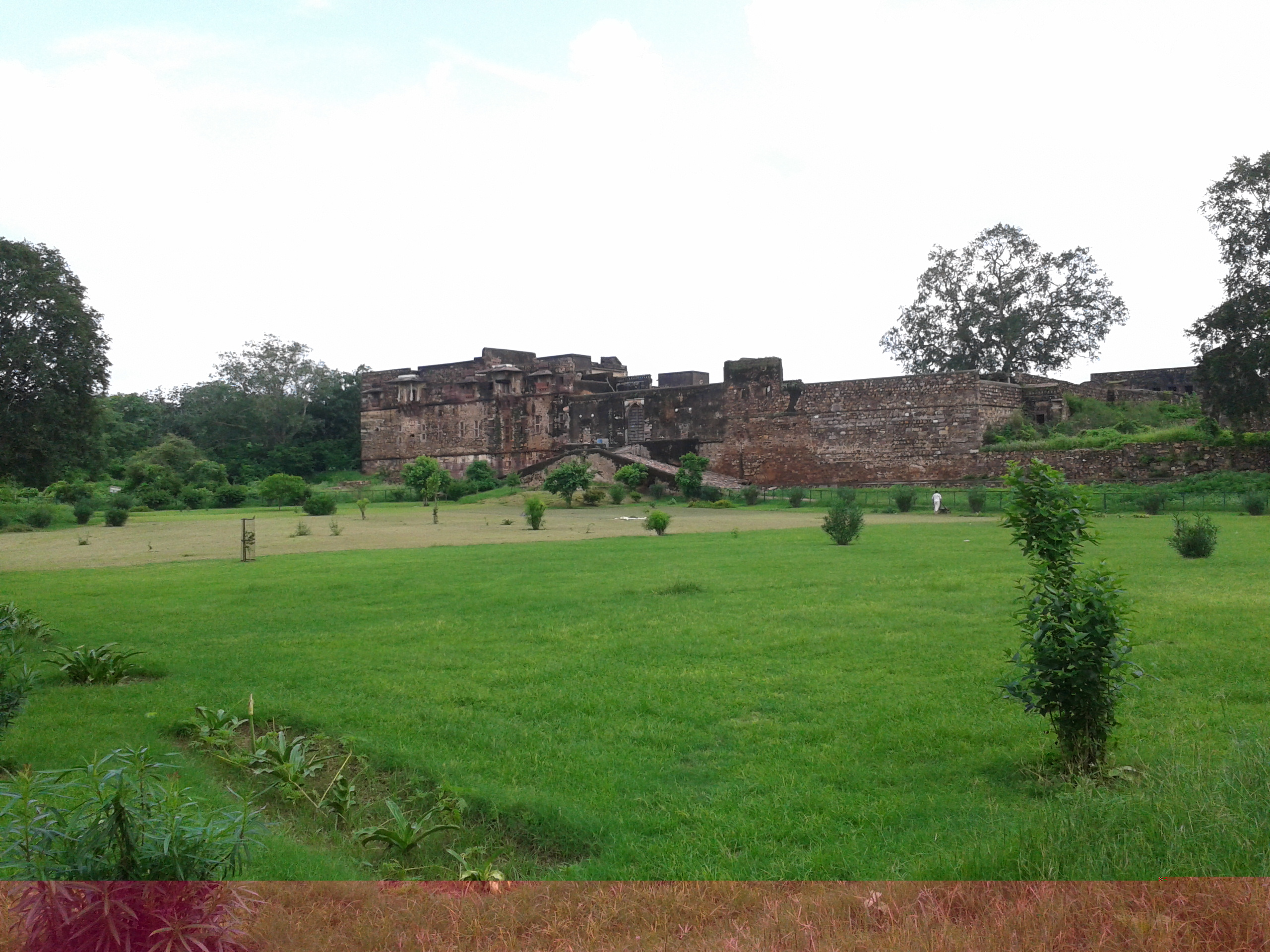
- Hammira's palace at the Ranthambore Fort

King of Ranthambore
- Reign: 1283 – 10 July 1301
- Predecessor: Shaktideva
- Successor: Position disestablished
- Died: 10 July 1301; Ranthambore Fort, Kingdom of Ranthambore
- Dynasty: Chahamana

Hammiradeva (IAST: Hammīra-deva; c. 1283 – 10 July 1301), also known as Hammir Dev Chauhan in vernacular legends, was the last ruler of Ranasthambhpura (Ranthambore) from the Chahamana dynasty. He is popularly known for the resistance against the Khalji expansion in the Rajputana region.

Hammiradeva ruled a kingdom centred around Ranthambore in present-day Rajasthan, India. In the 1280s, he raided several neighbouring kingdoms. In the 1290s, he successfully defended his kingdom against Jalaluddin Khalji of the Delhi Sultanate. In 1299, he gave asylum to some Mongol rebels from Delhi, which prompted Jalaluddin's successor Alauddin Khalji to invade his kingdom. Hammira achieved some successes against Alauddin's generals Ulugh Khan and Nusrat Khan, but he was ultimately defeated and killed in 1301 after a long siege.

Hammira is celebrated as a hero in several texts composed after his death including Nayachandra Suri's Hammira Mahakavya, Jodharaja's Hammira Raso, and Chandrashekhara's Hammira-Hatha.

== Early life ==
Hammiradeva was a son of the Chahamana king Jaitrasimha (Jaitra Singh) and queen Hira Devi. The name "Hammira" is a Sanskritized form of the Arabic title Amir. Little is known about him, except the Hammira Mahakavya, written by a poet about 100 years after Hammiradeva's death and whose reliability has been questioned. Hammiradeva had two elder brothers named Suratrana and Virama.

When Jaitrasimha retired because of old age, he appointed Hammiradeva as his successor, although Hammira was not his eldest son. The Hammira Mahakavya dates Hammira's ascension to 1283 CE (1339 VS). However, according to a genealogy given in the Prabandha Kosha, Hammira ascended the throne in 1285 CE. Historian Dasharatha Sharma speculates that Jaitrasimha lived until 1285 CE, which may explain this discrepancy.

== Early rule ==
Soon after his ascension, Hammiradeva launched a series of raids against his Hindu neighbours until 1288. The Hammira Mahakavya presents these raids as a systematic digvijaya ("conquests in all directions") campaign. However, Hammiradeva's own inscriptions do not mention any dgivijaya campaign.

The Balvan inscription of 1288 CE mentions that Hammiradeva captured the elephant force of Arjuna II, the Paramara king of Malwa. The Paramaras had greatly declined in power, and their kingdom faced an internal rebellion after Arjuna's death. Taking advantage of this, several of their enemies had plundered Malwa.

According to the Hammira Mahakavya, Hammiradeva also subjugated Arjuna, the ruler of a principality called Bhimarasa. Next, he extracted tribute from the Manḍalakṛta fort (modern Mandalgarh). Hammira then targeted Bhoja II, the successor of Arjuna II in Malwa. He defeated the Paramara forces, and reached as far as Ujjayini (Ujjain) and Dhara (Dhar). He then returned home via the place called Chittor, Abu, Vardhanapura (Badnor), Changa, Pushkar, Maharashtra (present-day Marot village), Khandilla (Khandela), Champa and Karkarala (Karauli). At Karkarala, he received homage from the ruler of Tribhuvanagiri (Timangarh).

Out of all these raids, Hammira's own inscriptions mention only his successes in Malwa. Therefore, historian Dasharatha Sharma doubts the historicity of the other raids described in the Hammira Mahakavya, and considers its digivjaya account as fictitious.

The Balvan inscription mentions that Hammira performed a ritual sacrifice known as Koti-yajna twice. This sacrifice appears to have been similar to the Ashvamedha ceremony, which was proved by ancient Indian kings to prove their sovereignty. The Koti yajna performed by the royal priest Vishvarupa.

== Conflict with the Delhi Sultanate ==
Location of Delhi and Ranthambore

Hammira's wars with his Hindu neighbours ultimately left him without any allies against his powerful northern neighbour, the Muslim-ruled Delhi Sultanate.

=== Jalaluddin Khalji ===
In 1290, Jalaluddin Khalji, the ruler of the Delhi Sultanate, invaded Hammira's territory. He defeated Hammira's forces led by Gurdan Saini, who was killed in the battle. The Delhi army captured Jhain, and then marched towards Ranthambore. They besieged the Ranthambore fort with manjaniqs (siege engines), but were unable to capture the fort. Jalaluddin ultimately gave up, and returned to Delhi.

After Jalaluddin's retreat, Hammira recaptured Jhain. In 1292, Jalaluddin once again invaded Jhain, this time unsuccessfully.

=== Alauddin Khalji ===
In 1299, some Mongol soldiers of Delhi Sultanate mutined against their generals. Hammira granted asylum to two of these leaders — Muhammad Shah (alias Mahim Shah) and Kabhru — and their followers. He rejected the demands to surrender these soldiers, leading to an invasion from the Delhi Sultanate.

Hammira lost his general Bhimasamha to an invasion led by the Delhi general Ulugh Khan. Hammira held his minister Dharmasimha responsible for this debacle, and had him castrated and blinded. However, Dharmasimha soon gained back the king's favour, by raising money for his fight against the Delhi forces. This money was raised through heavy taxes on the general public, which made Hammira very unpopular among the masses. His brothers Bhoja and Pithasimha defected to Alauddin as a result of Dharmasimha's scheming.

At Bhoja's instigation, Alauddin sent a stronger army to Ranthambore. However, this army was defeated by Hammira's generals, which included the rebel Mongol leaders. Alauddin next dispatched Nusrat Khan, the governor of Awadh, to reinforce Ulugh Khan's forces. The combined Delhi forces advanced up to Ranthambore, and besieged the fort. Some days later, Nusrat Khan was hit by a manjaniq stone and killed. Taking advantage of the situation, Hammira came out of the fort with a large army, and forced Ulugh Khan to retreat.

After Nusrat Khan's death, Alauddin decided to personally lead the siege of Ranthambore. He ordered his officers from his various provinces to assemble their contingents at Tilpat, and then led a joint force to Ranthambore. After a prolonged siege followed, during which Hammira's officers Ratipala and Ranamalla defected to Alauddin's side.

By July 1301, Hammira was in a dire situation owing to the defections and a famine-like situation within the fort. Therefore, he decided to fight to death with his loyal men. The ladies of the fort, led by his chief queen Ranga Devi, died by jauhar (mass self-immolation to avoid falling into the enemy hands). Hammira offered safe passages to his brother Virama, his minister Jaja, and the rebel Mongol leader Muhammad Shah, but all of them refused to desert him. Virama died fighting by his side in a last stand. Jaja, whom Hammira had appointed as his successor, died two days later while defending the fort. Muhammad Shah was wounded in the action, and later executed on Alauddin's orders. Hammira and his loyal companions marched to the top of the pasheb mound, where they fought to death with Alauddin's army. Some Rajput-era bards claim that Hammira severed his own head and offered it to the god Mahadeva when faced with a certain defeat.

== Cultural activities ==
According to the Jain scholar Nayachandra, Hammira was generous towards Brahmins, and respected all Indian faiths, including Jainism.

According to Sharngadhara-Paddhati, Hammira was a pupil of the scholar-poet Raghavadeva, who was a grandfather of the famous anthologist Sharngadhara. Hammira also patronised the poet Bijaditya.

== In popular culture ==
Hammira has been hailed as a hero in several works written after his death, including those written in Sanskrit, Prakrit, Hindi and Rajasthani languages. The Hammira Mahakavya, his biography by the Jain scholar Nayachandra Suri, is a major source of information about him. Surjana-Charita also describes him, although it is not entirely reliable from a historical point-of-view. He is also mentioned in a few verses of Prakrta-Pingala (or Prakrta-Paingalam, 14th century) and Sharngadhara-Paddhati. A Hindi film Hameer Hath (1964) is based on his life.

Two later Hindi works on his life include Hammira Raso by Jodharaja and Hammira-Hatha by Chandrashekhara. However, these are of little historical value.
