= Chahamanas of Ranastambhapura =

13th century Indian dynasty

- 1192–1301
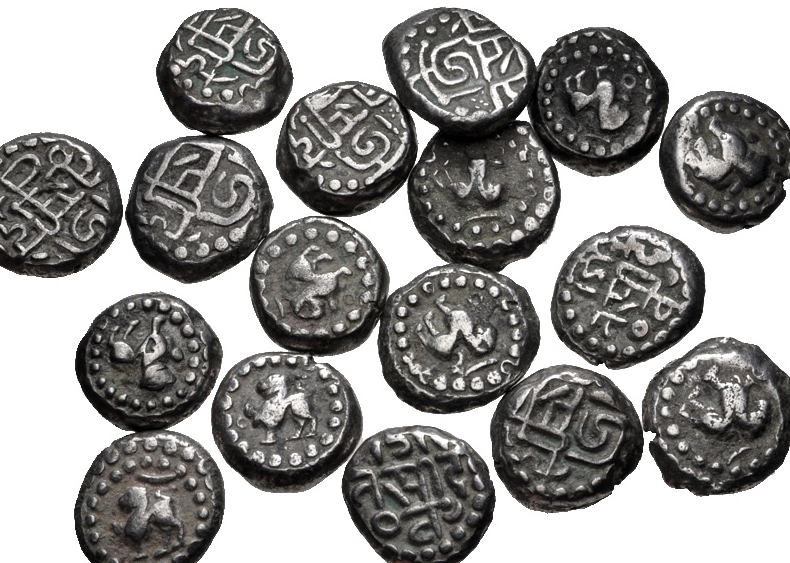
- Silver drachm coins of the Chauhans of Ranthambhor
- Capital: Ranastambhapura
- Government: Absolute monarchy
- History
  - Established: 1192
  - Disestablished: 1301
Preceded by	Succeeded by
Chahamanas of Shakambhari	Delhi Sultanate
- Today part of: India

Ranthambore in present-day India

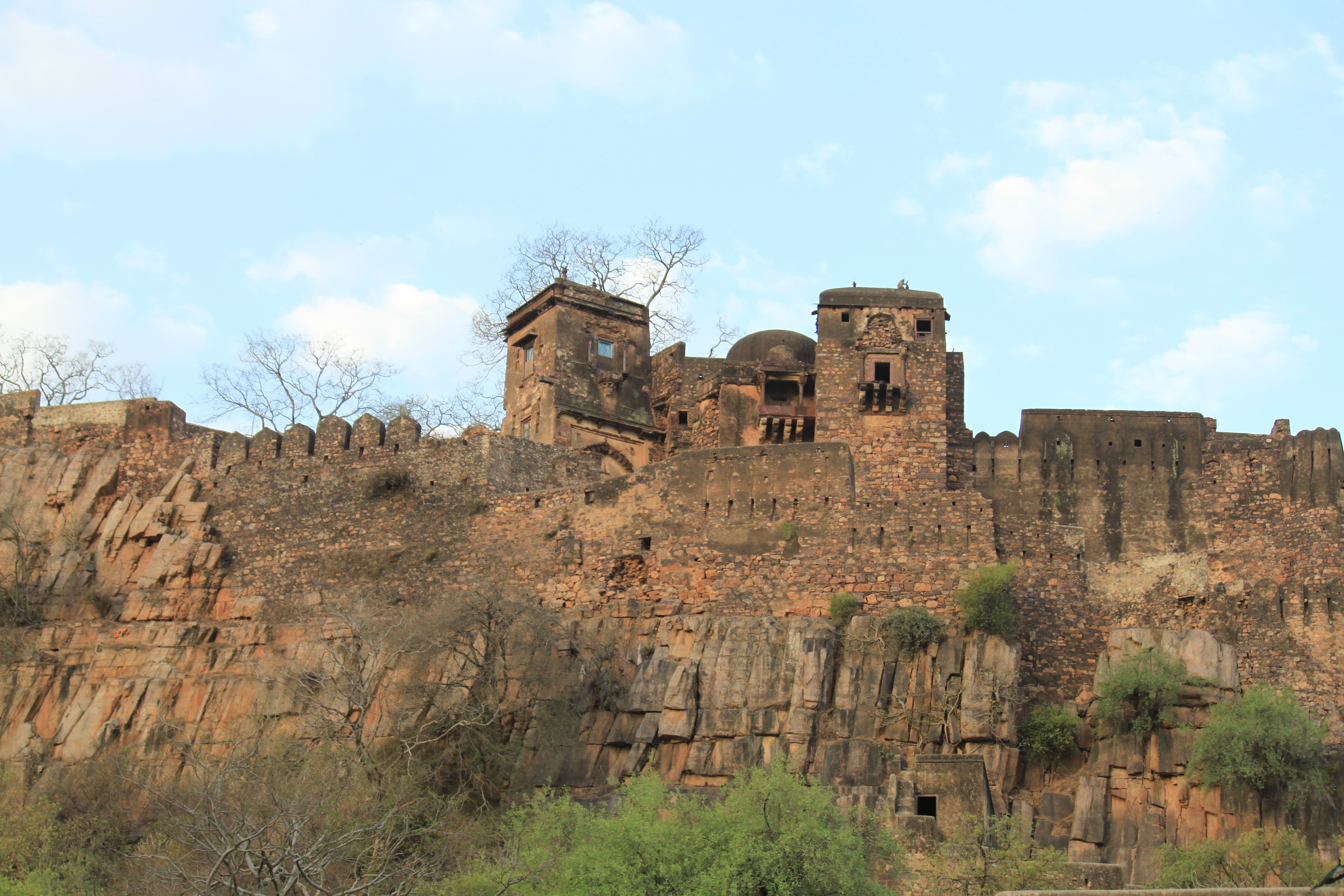
The Ranthambore fort

The Chahamanas of Ranastambhapura were a 13th-century Indian dynasty. They ruled the area around their capital Ranastambhapura (Ranthambore) in present-day Rajasthan, initially as vassals of the Delhi Sultanate, and later gained independence. They belonged to the Chahamana (Chauhan) clan of the Rajputs, and are also known as Chauhans of Ranthambore in vernacular Rajasthani bardic literature.

The Chahamana line of Ranastambhapura was established by Govindaraja, who agreed to rule as a vassal of the Ghurids in 1192, after they defeated his father, the Shakambhari Chahamana king Prithviraja III. Govindaraja's descendants gained and lost their independence to the Delhi Sultanate multiple times during the 13th century. Hammira, the last king of the dynasty, adopted an expansionist policy, and raided several neighbouring kingdoms. The dynasty ended with his defeat against the Delhi Sultan Alauddin Khalji at the Siege of Ranthambore in 1301.

== History ==
The Chahamana dynasty of Ranastambhapura was established by Govinda-raja, a member of the Shakambhari Chahamana family (also known as the Chauhans of Ajmer). Govinda was the son of Prithviraja III, who was defeated and killed in a battle with the Ghurids, in 1192 CE. The Ghurid ruler Muhammad of Ghor appointed Govinda as his vassal at Ajmer. However, Prithviraja's brother Hari-raja de-throned him, and himself became the ruler of Ajmer. Govinda then established a new kingdom with its capital at Ranastambhapura (modern Ranthambor). After the Muslim conquest of Ajmer, he granted asylum to Hari.

Balhana, the son of Govindaraja, is recorded as a vassal of the Delhi Sultan Iltumish in 1215 CE, but declared independence in the later years. Balhana's elder son Prahlada succeeded him, and died in a lion-hunt. Prahlada's son Viranarayana was invited to Delhi by Iltumish, but was poisoned to death there. Iltumish captured the fort in 1226 CE. Balhana's younger son Vagabhata then ascended the throne. He recaptured Ranthambore during the reign of the Delhi ruler Razia (r. 1236-1240). He successfully defended the fort against the Delhi Sultanate's invasions in 1248 and 1253 CE.

Hammira-Deva, the last ruler of the dynasty, was also its most powerful ruler. He ascended the throne sometime between 1283 and 1289 CE. Hammira Mahakavya, his biography by Nayachandra, is one of the few non-Muslim sources for the region's history from that period, and enables the historians to verify the accounts of the Muslim chronicles. The Balvan inscription of 1288 CE mentions that Hammira captured the elephant force of Arjuna II, the Paramara king of Malwa. The Hammira-Mahakavya suggests that he also defeated Arjuna's successor Bhoja II, marched to Chitrakuta, conquered Medapata, and forced the submission of the Paramara king of Abu. Afterwards, he sacked Vardhamanapura, conquered Pushkara, Shakambari, and various other locations before returning to his capital. Hammira's wars with other Hindu chiefdoms made him unable to form an alliance against the Muslim Delhi Sultanate. He successfully resisted invasions by Jalal-ud-din and Ala-ud-din's general Ulugh Khan, but was finally killed in a 1301 invasion led by Ala-ud-din Khalji.

== List of rulers ==
List of Chauhan rulers of Ranastambhapura (Ranthambore)
  - (1) Govinda-raja (1192)
  - (2) Balhana-deva
  - (3) Prahlada-deva
  - (4) Viranarayana
  - (5) Vagabhata
  - (6) Unknown
  - (7) Shakti-deva
  - (8) Hammira-deva (1283–1311)
