= Moole Shankareshvara Temple, Turuvekere =

Moola Shankareshvara Temple
- Hindu temple
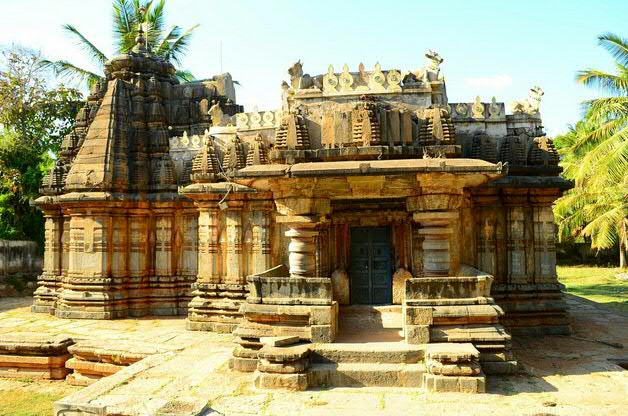
- Moole Shankareshvara temple (1260 A.D.) at Turuvekere in Tumkur district
- Interactive map of Moola Shankareshvara Temple
- Country: India
- State: Karnataka
- District: Tumkur District

Languages
  - Official: Kannada
- Time zone: UTC+5:30 (IST)

The Shankareshvara temple (also spelt "Shankareshwara" or "Sankaresvara"), dedicated to the Hindu god Shiva is located in Turuvekere, a small town in the Tumkur district, Karnataka state, India. Turuvekere, founded as an Agraharam town (a place of learning) in the 13th century is located about 77 miles from the state capital Bangalore. The temple was built around 1260 A.D. during the rule of the Hoysala Empire King Narasimha III. This temple is a protected monument under the Karnataka state division of the Archaeological Survey of India.

== Temple plan ==
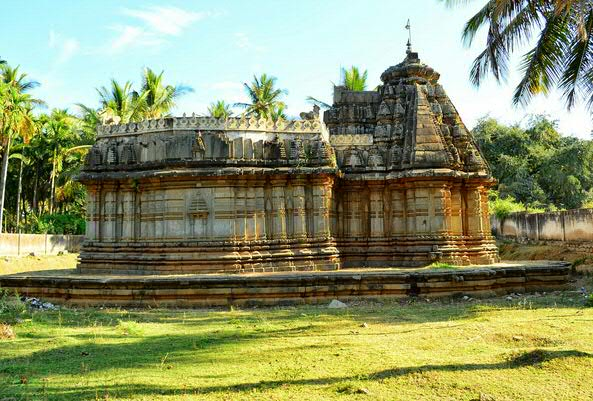
Moole Shankara temple at Turuvekere

According to the art historian Adam Hardy, the temple plan is a Bhumija Nagara style (north Indian) on a semi-stellate base (called mula-prasada). The building material is the standard Soap stone and the hall (mantapa) is a closed one.

The temple has all the basic elements of a standard Hoysala temple and comprises a sanctum (garbhagriha) which is connected to a closed hall by a square vestibule (sukhanasi). The entrance into the hall from the outside is through a porch (mukhamantapa). Typically, a closed hall in a Hoysala temple has no windows. The porch consists of an awning supported by two decorative half pillars with two parapets on both sides. The shrine has a tower (shikhara). The vestibule has its own tower (also called sukhanasi) which appears like a low extension of the main tower over the shrine. For its appearance, art critic Gerard Foekema calls it the "nose" of the main tower. From the outside, the walls of the vestibule are inconspicuous and appear like a short extension of the shrine wall. The ceiling of the closed hall is supported by four lathe turned pillars. This is a norm in all Hoysala temples. These pillars divide the ceiling into nine highly decorated bays. The porch with its half pillars also serves the purpose of an open hall with a single bay ceiling. The outer wall of the hall and shrine are articulated with full pilasters. Between full pilasters, turrets and miniature towers on half-pilasters (aedicula) provide a decorative look. Below these, forming the base of the temple, are the six horizontal moldings.

== Other prominent Examples of Bhumija architecture ==
- Shiv Mandir, Ambarnath
- Ramappa Temple, Telangana
- Arang Jain temples
- Galateshwar Temple, Gujarat (rare Bhumija temple with Gujarati Chaulukya influence)
- Tryambakeshwar Temple
