= Shahi Mahal and Mosque =

Former mosque in Udaypur, Madhya Pradesh, India

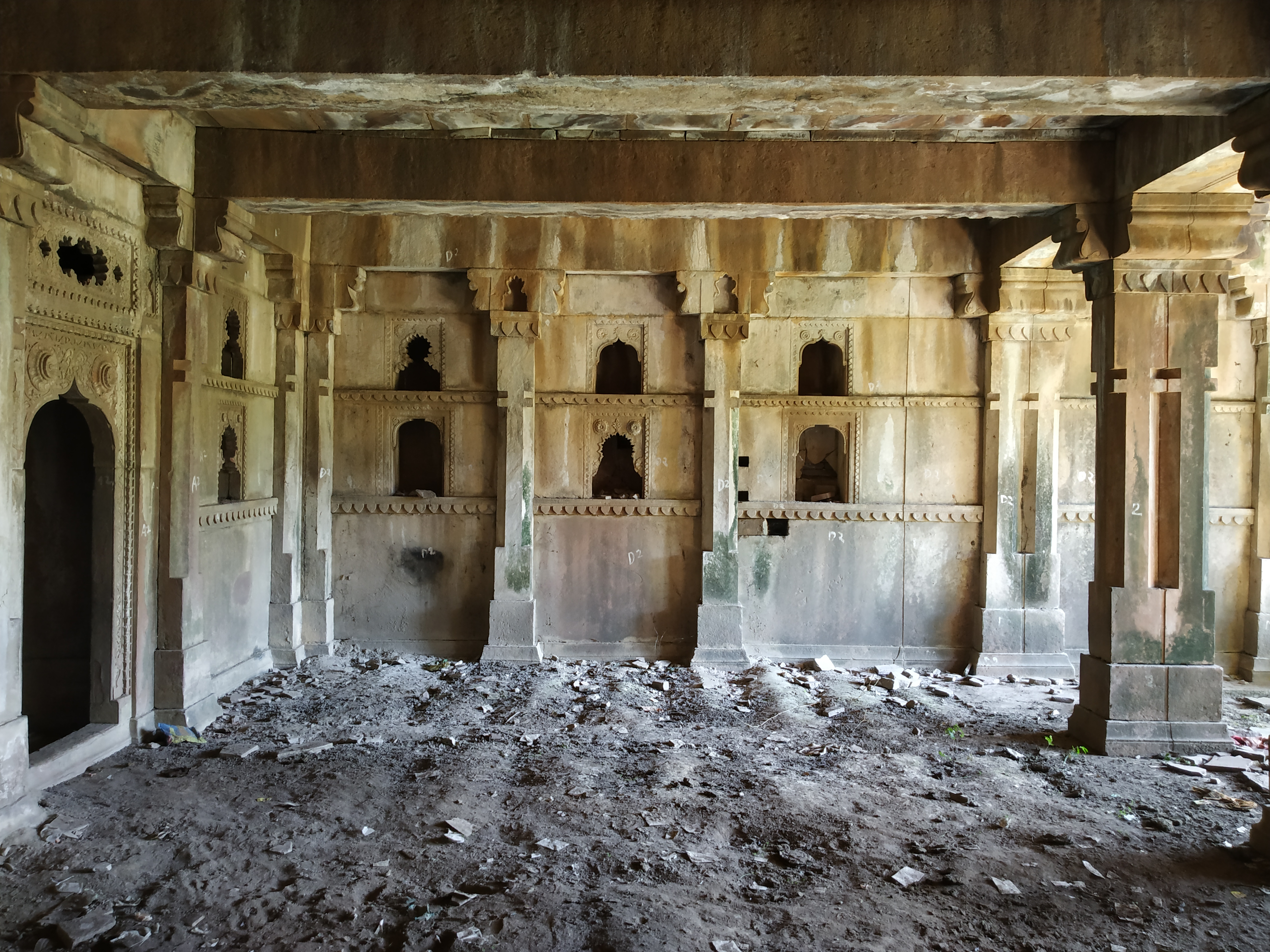
- Partial ruins of the mosque interior, in 2020, with cusped arch niches, typical of Mughal architecture

- Location of the former mosque and mahal in Madhya Pradesh

Religion
- Affiliation: Islam (former)
- Ecclesiastical or organisational status: Mosque and mahal (former)
- Status: Inactive; (partial ruinous state)

Location
- Location: Udaypur, Vidisha district, Madhya Pradesh
- Country: India
- Coordinates: 23°54′02″N 78°03′35″E

Architecture
- Type: Mosque architecture
- Style: Mughal
- Completed: c. 1026 AH (1616/1617 CE) to 1041 AH (1631/1632 CE)

The Shahi Mahal and Mosque, also known locally as Shāhī Maḥal and Shāhī Masjid or Qāḍiyon-kī-Masjid, is a large palace and former mosque complex, in partial ruins, located in the village of Udaypur, in the Vidisha district, in the state of Madhya Pradesh, India. Built between 1026 AH (1616/1617 CE) and 1041 AH (1631/1632 CE), the edifice is a short distance to the east of the Nīlakaṇṭheśvara temple.

== Architecture ==
The Shāhī Maḥal served as the residence of the local governor during the Mughal rule. Built on a rectangular plan, the maḥal has four corner towers and a two-storey elevation, with a suite of rooms disposed around two interlinked courtyards, all decorated in the simple and elegant stonecarving style of the 17th century. The existing ruins retain traces of excellent stone jālī work.

Forming an adjunct of the maḥal is a big mosque, an imposing edifice locally known as Shāhī Masjid or Qāḍiyon-kī-Masjid. A Persian inscription carved on a slab measuring 65 by 42 centimetres (26 by 17 in), affixed on the central mihrab of the mosque, records its foundation by Qāḍi Awliyā b. Sayyid ʿAbd al-Ṣamad al-Ḥasanī on 4 Rajab 1026 Hijrī, or 28 June 1617 CE, at the time when Emperor Jahāngīr was on a visit to Mandu. A second Persian inscription carved on a slab measuring 1.24 metres (4 ft 1 in) by 2.5 centimetres (1 in), in a balcony projecting from the north wall of the mosque records that the mosque was only half complete when both king and qāḍi died, and that it was finally completed by Sayyid Ḥāmid and Sayyid Dāʾūd, sons of Qāḍi Awliyā, on 10 Dhū'l-Ḥijja 1041 Hijrī, or 18 June 1632 CE, during the reign of Emperor Shāhjahān. Both inscriptions show that this mosque served as the main jama masjid (congregational mosque) of Udaypur in the Mughal period and was the seat of the town's state-appointed qāḍi. The epigraphs are also significant for the political geography of the times, showing that qasba Udaypur was then part of sarkar Chanderi and subah Malwa, on the border of Gondwana.

== See also ==
- Islam in India
- List of mosques in India
