= Tughluq Shāhī Mosque =

Former mosque in Madhya Pradesh, India

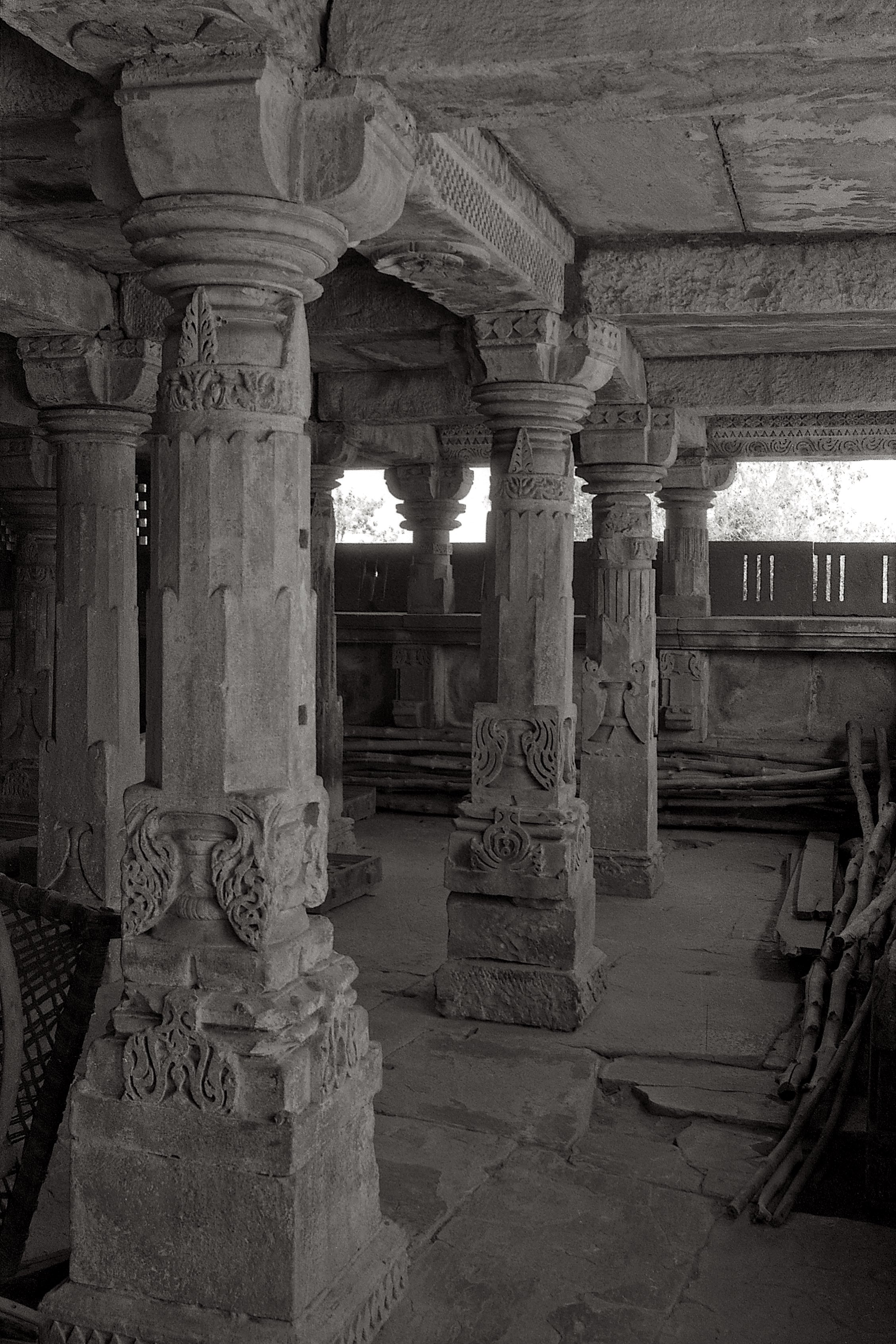
- The prayer hall, looking north, 1982

- Location of the former mosque in Madhya Pradesh

Religion
- Affiliation: Islam (former)
- Ecclesiastical or organisational status: Mosque (former)
- Status: Inactive; (partial ruinous state)

Location
- Location: Udaypur, Vidisha district, Madhya Pradesh
- Country: India
- Coordinates: 22°35′02″N 75°17′53″E

Architecture
- Type: Mosque architecture
- Completed: 739 AH (1338/1339 CE)

Monument of National Importance
- Official name: Tughluq Shāhī Mosque
- Reference no.: N-MP-289

The Tughluq Shāhī Mosque is a former small mosque, now in partial ruins, located west of the Nīlakaṇṭheśvara temple, in Udaypur, in the Vidisha district of the state of Madhya Pradesh, India. The mosque was constructed in the time of Muḥammad bin Tughluq (1325–51). The building is part of a protected Monument of National Importance under the jurisdiction of the Archaeological Survey of India.

== Description ==
The mosque consists of a covered prayer hall, built on the temple platform. It incorporates a number of older pillars, and preserves the balcony seats with sloping backs (kakṣāsna) that once surrounded most of the temple complex. A small arched mihrab was added to the western wall at the time construction.

The mosque was built in the 14th century, as testified by two inscriptions on small arched gates still standing either side of the Śiva temple. These inscriptions date 739 AH (1338/1339 CE).

"Hath said the Prophet, may God's peace and blessings rest upon him: "He who builds a masjid in this world, God Almighty builds (for him) a palace in Paradise." (Was built) this mosque during the reign and khilāfat (viceroyalty of) sovereign of kings, Abū'l-Mujāhid (Father of Warriors) Muḥammad son of Tughlaq, may his rule and kingdom be perpetuated. The builder of this pious (work is the) humble Aḥmad Wajih, (may) God enhance his dignity. (In the) year 737."

— R. Saksena 1926.

== Gallery ==
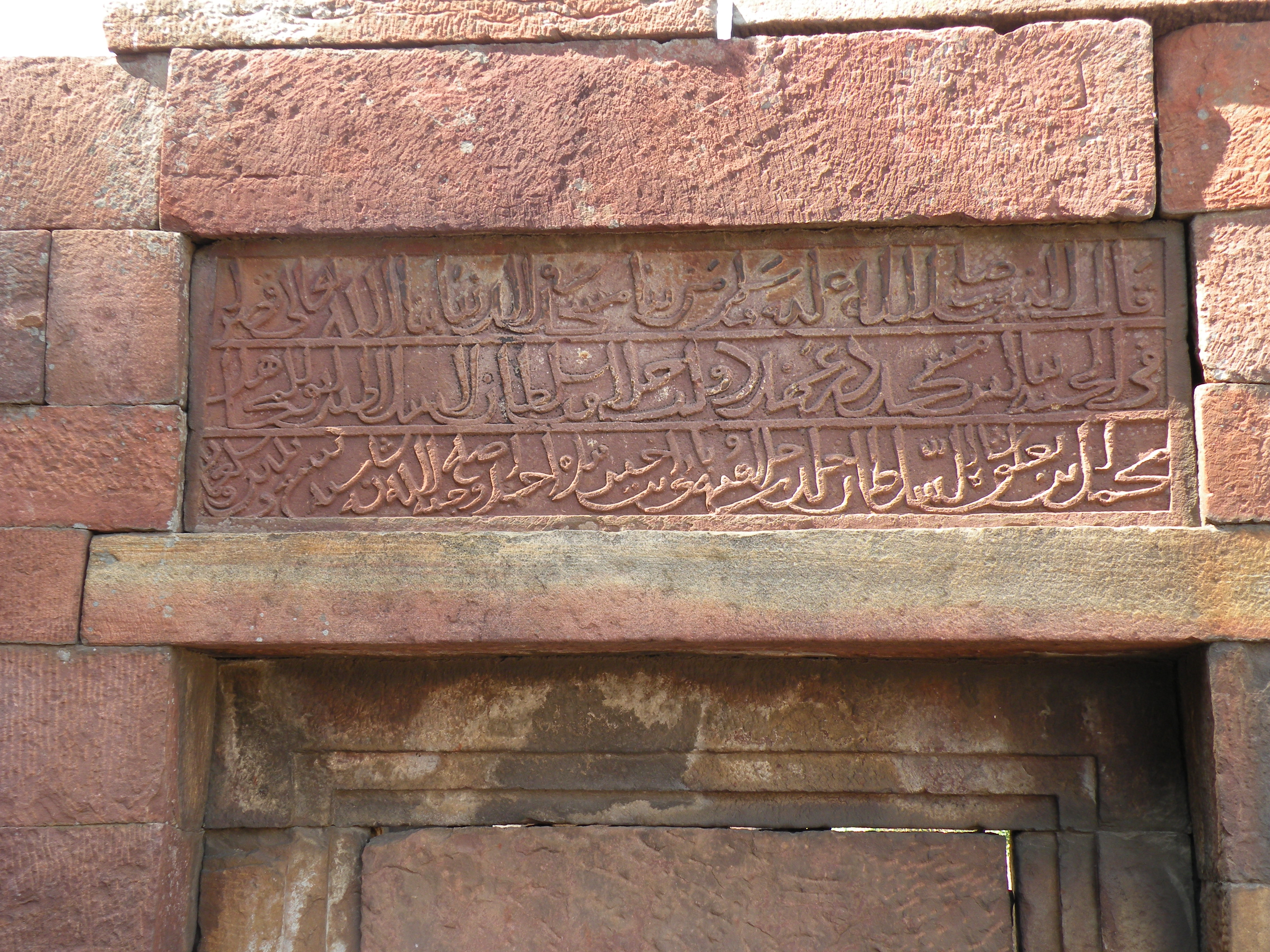
One of a pair of mosque inscriptions, dated 739 AH (1338/1339 CE).

== See also ==
- Islam in India
- List of mosques in India
