= Bhumija =

Type of shikhara

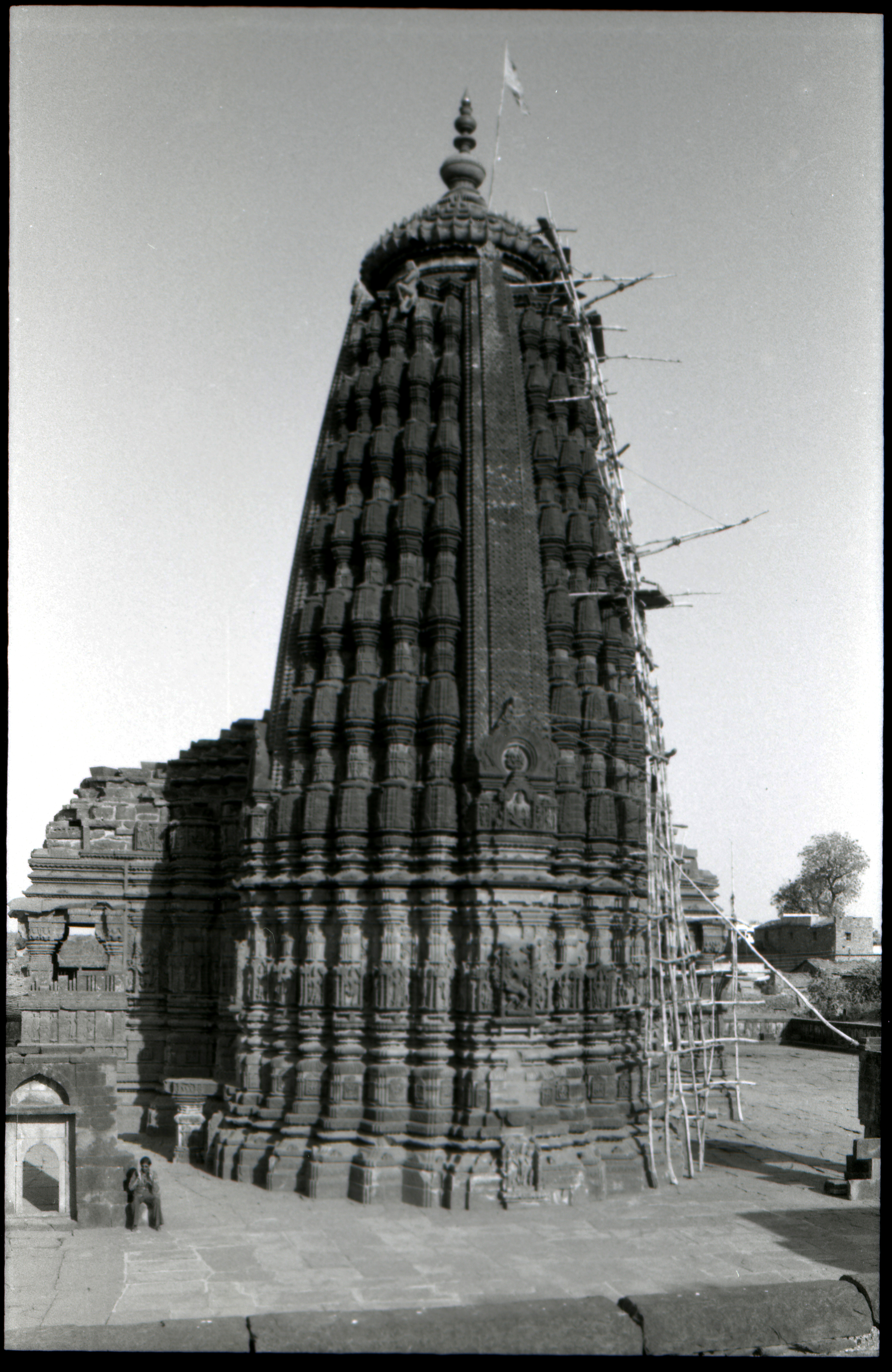
11th-century Nilakanthesvara (Udayesvara) temple in central Madhya Pradesh is the best example of Bhumija style.

Bhumija (IAST bhūmija; Sanskrit भूमिज) is a variety of north Indian temple architecture marked by how the rotating square-circle principle is applied to construct the shikhara (superstructure or spire) on top of the sanctum. Invented about the 10th-century in the Malwa region of central India (west Madhya Pradesh and southeast Rajasthan) during the Paramara dynasty rule, it is found in Hindu and Jain temples. Most early and elegant examples are found in and around the Malwa region, but this design is also found in Gujarat, Rajasthan, Deccan and some major Hindu temple complexes of southern and eastern India.

== Description ==
The square and circle plan applied together

The hallmark of Bhumija style is a square plan that is not divided, but instead rotated around its center and this rotation is stopped at regular intervals as the superstructure rises vertically. By adjusting the pace of rotation and the interval at which the rotation stops, many creative variations can be implemented. Each tier is called a bhumi. The general rule in Hindu texts is that the bhadras and salas remain parallel to the garbhagriya (sanctum's square in the cardinal direction), a rule that gives the superstructure aesthetic appeal and makes it easier to visually follow. The faces of the salas are also cut and aligned to the circle. This simultaneous use of the square and circle principle is the distinct feature of bhumija architecture. Some early temples skipped the periodic stop and decorations above, leading to a superstructure that looks elegantly smooth Prasada from distance, but surprises the viewer with meticulously detailed carvings at a close distance. The Bhumija may be implemented in one of two ways, either for the spire, or the entire Vimana or shrine. The latter approach gives Bhumija sub-category of the Nagara architecture, and when integrated with the jagati (platform) or the pitha (ground), it makes the temple appear as if it is emerging out of the earth.

== Texts and chronology ==
Bhumija is a Sanskrit word that literally means "from ground, earth, land", or alternatively "storey". In architectural context, the Bhumija style is discussed in chapter 65 of the Samarangana Sutradhara – an 11th-century Hindu text on classical temple and secular architecture (vastu). It is one of the fourteen styles of north Indian Nagara temple architecture discussed in Aparajitaprccha – another Hindu text on architecture published in the 12th-century. Thus, Bhumija architecture had already been invented by the 11th-century, was successful and widely adopted to appear in 11th-century Sanskrit texts on architecture. According to Mate, in an article published in 1975, it is likely that Bhumija style was explored in the 9th-century and became established by the 10th-century.

In the 1980s after his travels in remote eastern parts of Madhya Pradesh, Donald Stadtner – a scholar of Buddhist and Hindu Art history, published examples of proto-Bhumija temples from the 7th to 8th-century CE. This has shifted the proposed timeline of when and where the Bhumija architecture was originally explored. According to Stadtner's examples, the western parts of dakshina-kosala (modern Chhattisgarh) – to the east of Malwa – over the Panduvamsi period (Pratihara, Kachchapa ghata tradition) may have been the first experimenters and innovators on a stellate plan, that ultimately was perfected in Malwa by the 9th to 10th-century.

According to Adam Hardy – a scholar of Hindu and Jain temple architecture, most surviving examples of pre-13th century Hindu and Jain temples follow the guidelines in Samarangana Sutradhara.

=== Variations ===
The Aparajitaprccha text describes variations with the Bhumija style. These include sub-styles such as the vatta (circular), navanga (orthogonal), chatursa (orthogonal, four offsets), astasala (eight offsets) and others.

Sixteen variants of the Bhumija architecture are described in the Samarangana Sutradhara. Adam Hardy has published the Sanskrit verses that explain these and provide the mathematical ratios therein, with translations by Mattia Salvini.

== Examples ==
=== Religious architecture ===
The earliest known example of the Bhumija style are the ruins of a Hindu temples group south of the Narmada river, at village Un between Segaon and Khargone. Eight of these are in Bhumija style. The 11th-century Nilakanthesvara (Udayesvara) temple in Udaypur, Madhya Pradesh (north of Bhopal) is the best preserved and finest illustration of the Bhumija style. The sikhara of the Nilakanthesvara has a stellate plan with four latas (quadrants) inside which are five rows of aedicule. At each level there is a square plan, which is constantly rotated in a circular pattern to yield the entire spire.

The Bhumija style spread with variations into north Rajasthan, Gujarat, Maharashtra, and into the south. It is also seen close to Mahanadi valley in the east, such as Arang, Chhattisgarh and a few post 11th-century temples in Odisha. Near Pune, for example, both the intricately carved Mallikarjun Temple at Loni Bhapkar, and the temple in Palasdev, are Bhumija orthogonal variants. It is also common in Hoysala temples found all over Karnataka and nearby areas. However, with some exceptions, most Hoysala temples use it primarily for smaller temples within a larger temple complex.

Other examples:

- Siddesvara Temple, Nemawar, saptaratha-stellate-subtype
- Surya Temple, Jhalrapatan
- Bhand Deva Temple, Ramgarh crater, Rajasthan – combined with a major collection of kamasutra panels
- Malvai Temple, Alirajpur, stellate-subtype
- Mandakini Temple, Bijoliya, near Menal, Rajasthan
- Mahanalesvara Temple, Menal
- Shiv Mandir, Jamli, Madhya Pradesh (Jamaleshvara temple), orthogonal-subtype
- Balsane group of temples, Maharastra (east of Surat), pancaratha-subtype
- Shiv Mandir, Ambarnath, Maharashtra
- Galateshwar Mahadev Temple, Sarnal, Gujarat, ashtasala-subtype
- Surya Temple, Ranakpur, Rajasthan, ashtasala-subtype
- Moole Shankareshvara Temple, Turuvekere
- Ramappa Temple, Telangana
- Erakeswara Temple, Pillalamarri
- Bhand Deul, Arang Jain temples, Chhattisgarh
- Mahavira temple, Sewari (Shantinath Jain Tirth), Rajasthan, orthogonal-subtype
- Gondeshwar Temple, Sinnar, Nashik district, Maharashtra, pancaratha- and saptaratha-subtype
- Mankeshwar temple, Zodage, Nashik district, Maharashtra
- Chennakeshava Temple, Belur – small shrines near steps and aedicules show Bhumija-style tower

=== Secular architecture ===
The Bhumija architecture was deployed by Hindu artisans and Jain financiers to build zinc smelting operations in Zawar (Jawar, Javar), Rajasthan. These plants with Bhumija architecture were constructed between the 13th to 17th-century to condense zinc metal from vapors generated by heating locally found zinc ores mixed with soot, borax, resins, marking nuts and other local products. These recipes are found in the Rasa ratna samuccaya – a 13th-century Sanskrit text attributed to Vagabhatacharya. The first plant was commissioned by Maharana Laksh Singh in the 14th-century. The brick and stone-based bhumija shaped towers processed over a million tons of ores. The Zawar plants, states Deborah Stein citing Craddock and other scholars, yielded many tens of thousands of tons of zinc. These operations represented one of the world's oldest known industrial scale refining plants of zinc. However, these were not entirely secular structure because these pre-17th century zinc production operations integrated a Shiva (Bhairava) temple in the center, which were then surrounded by many condensation towers with bhumija architecture. The wealth created by the zinc operations in Zawar helped Jains build Jaina and Vaishnava temples nearby, many with bhumija architecture.

== Gallery ==
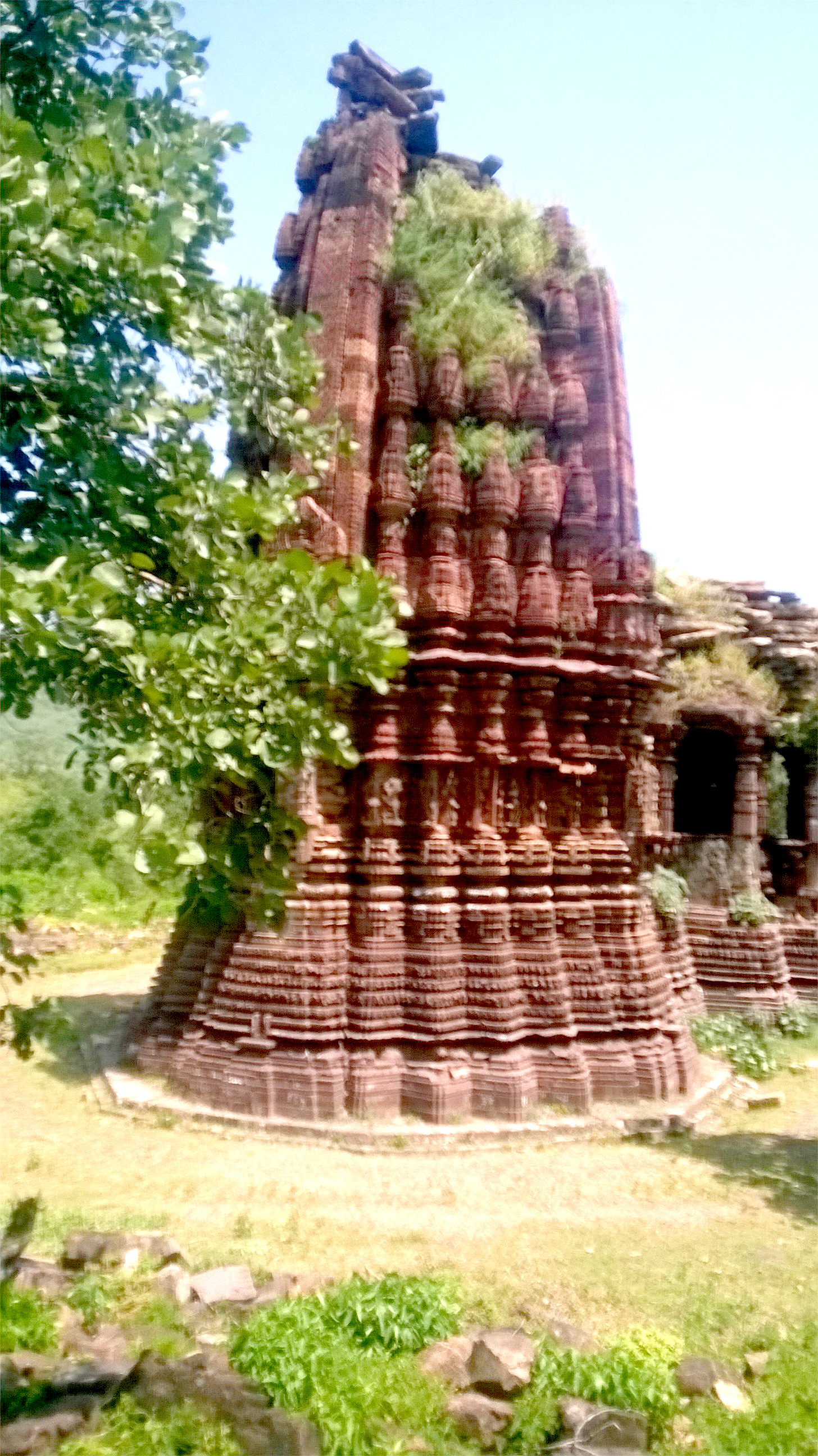
Bhand Deva temple, Rajasthan

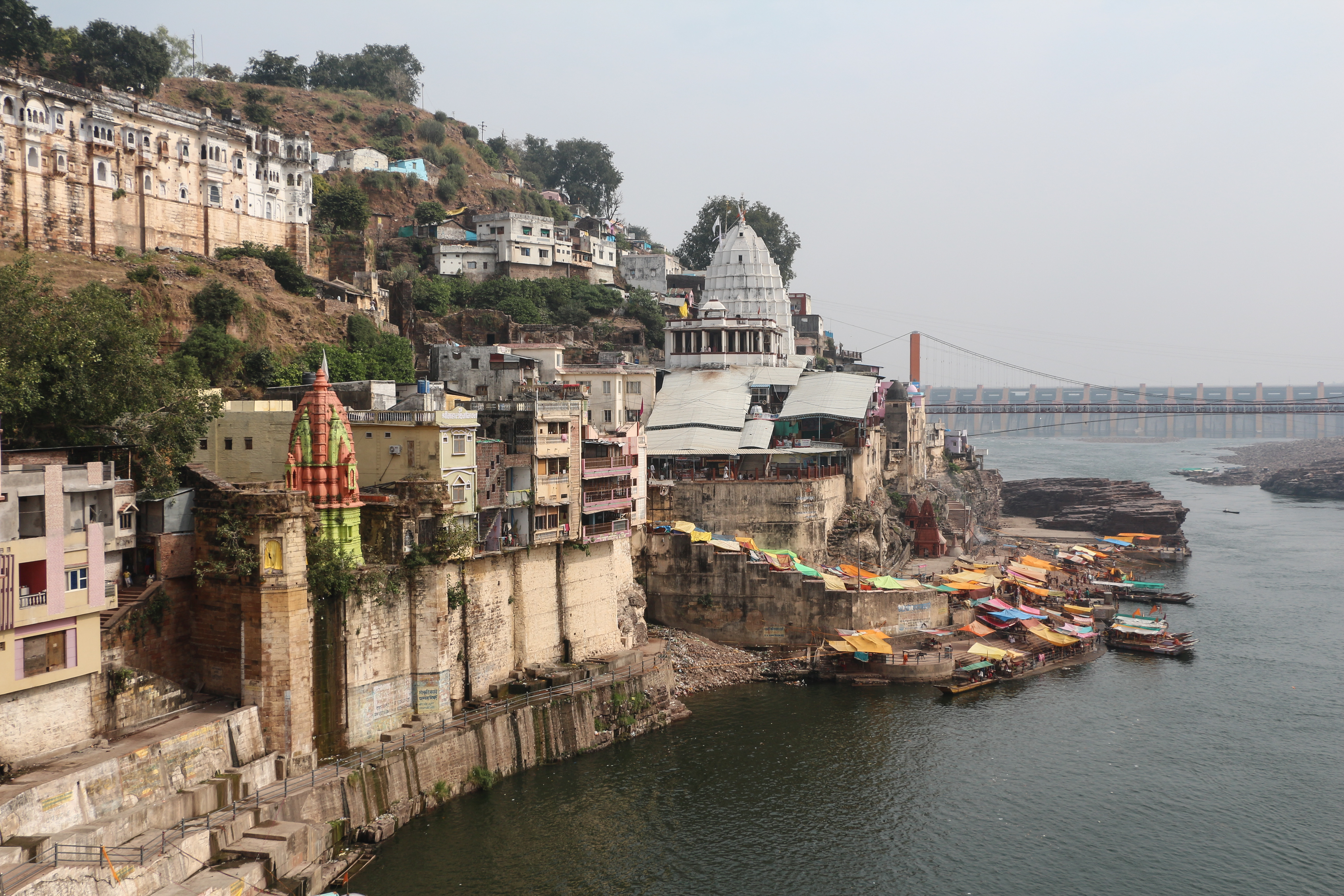
Two Bhumija temples, Narmada river (Omkareshwar temples, Mandhata)

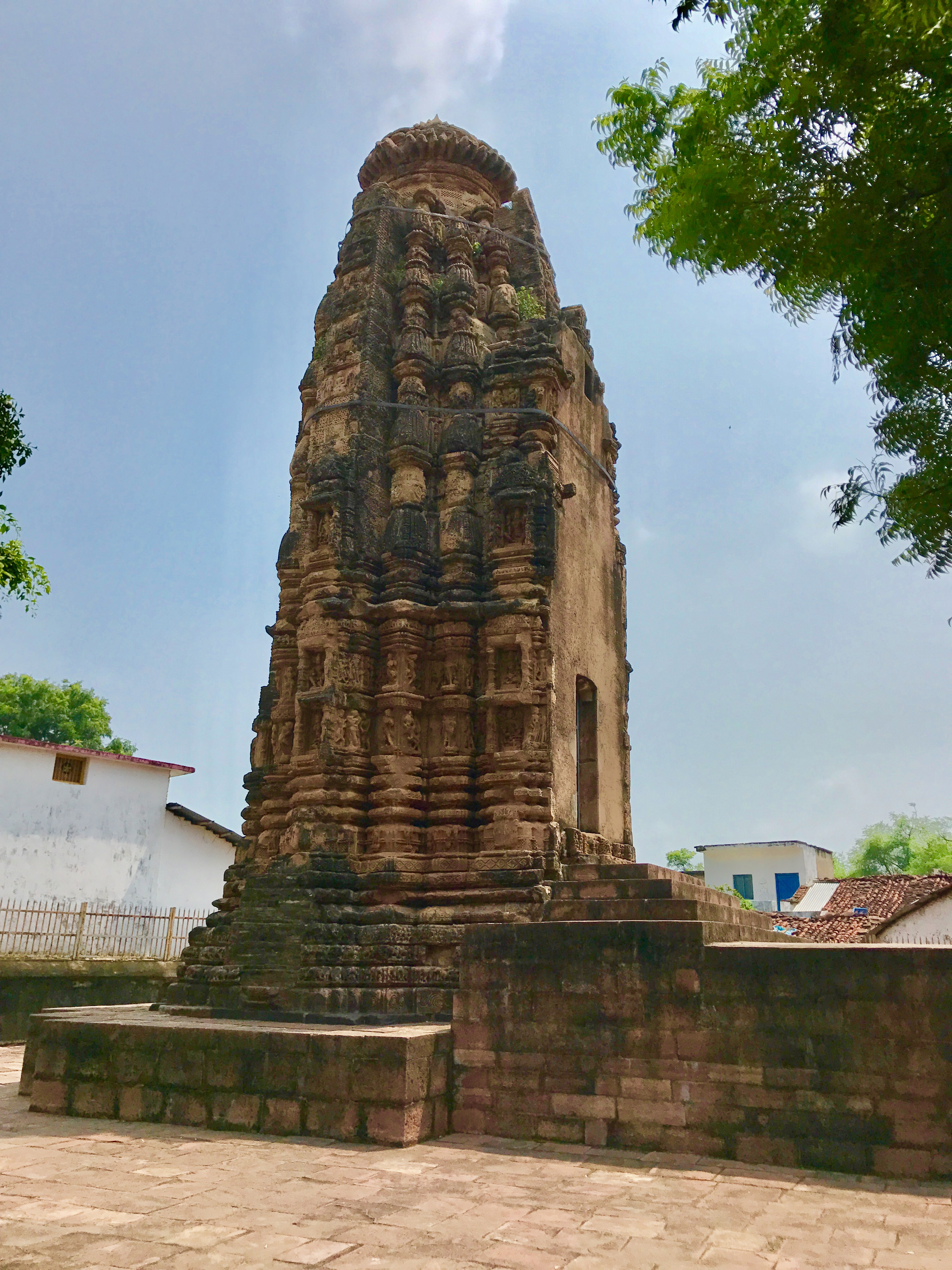
Bhand Deul (Jain), Arang, Chhattisgarh

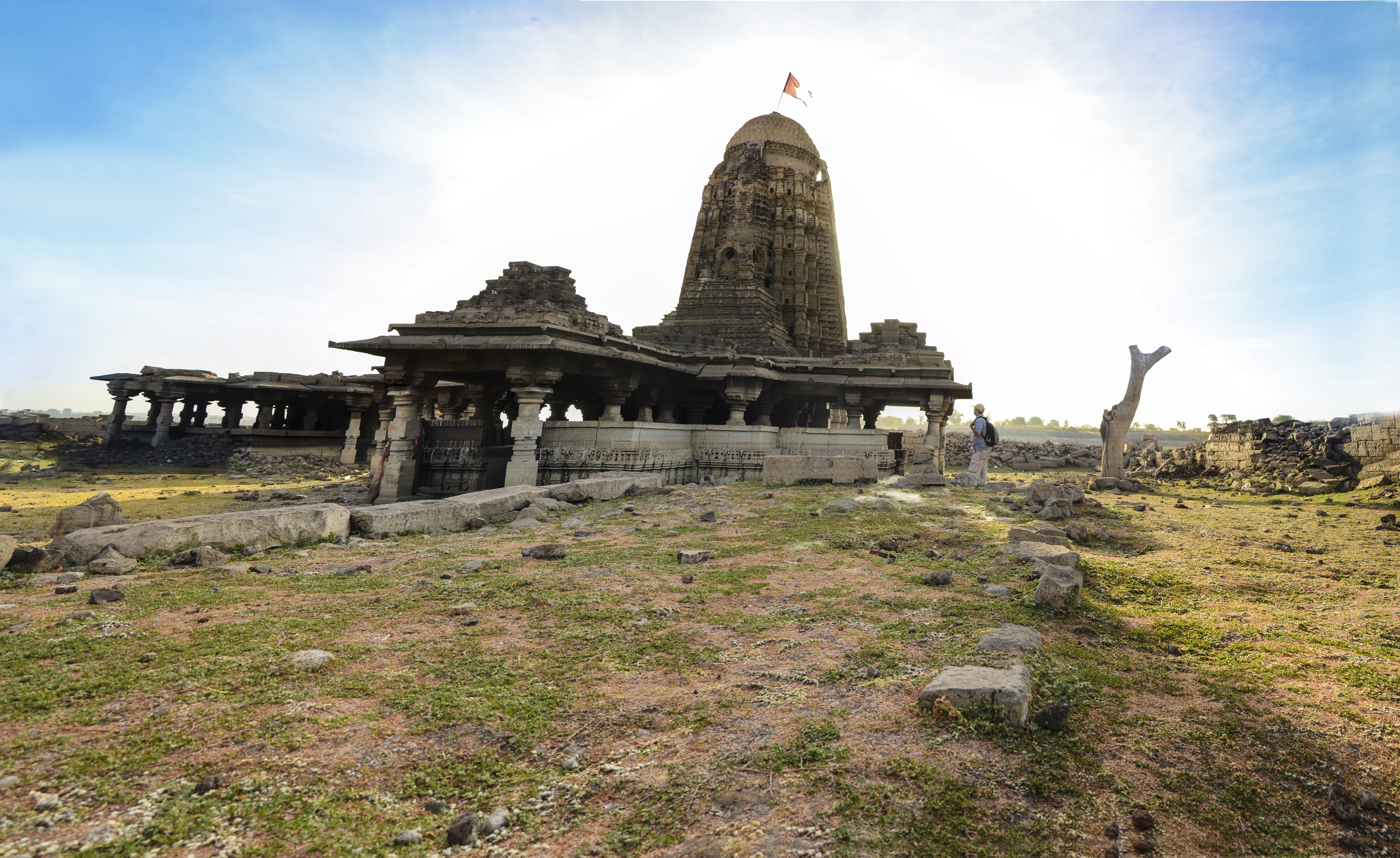
Palasdev temple, Maharashtra (between Pune and Solapur)

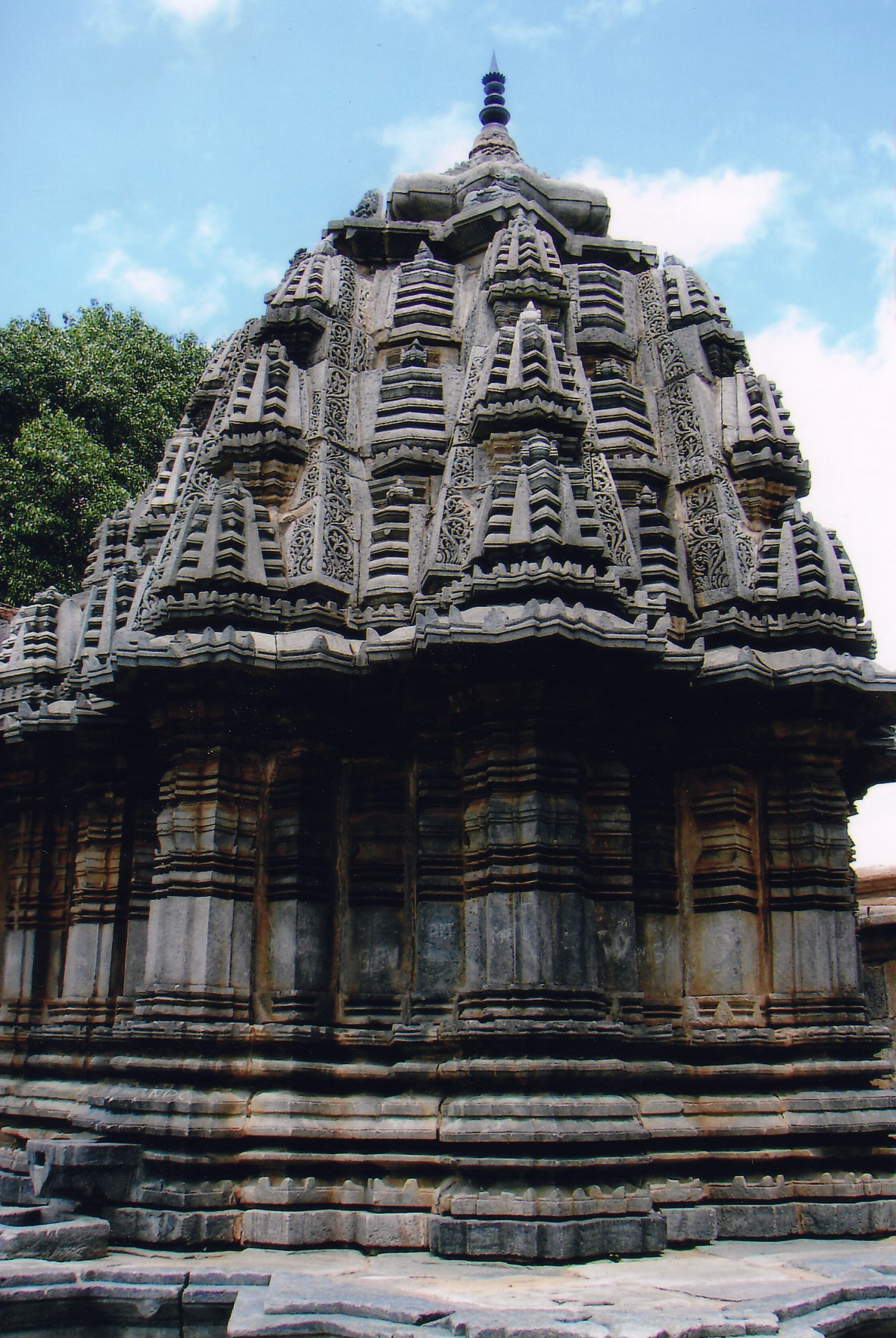
Sadashiva Temple (1249 CE) at Nuggehalli, Karnataka

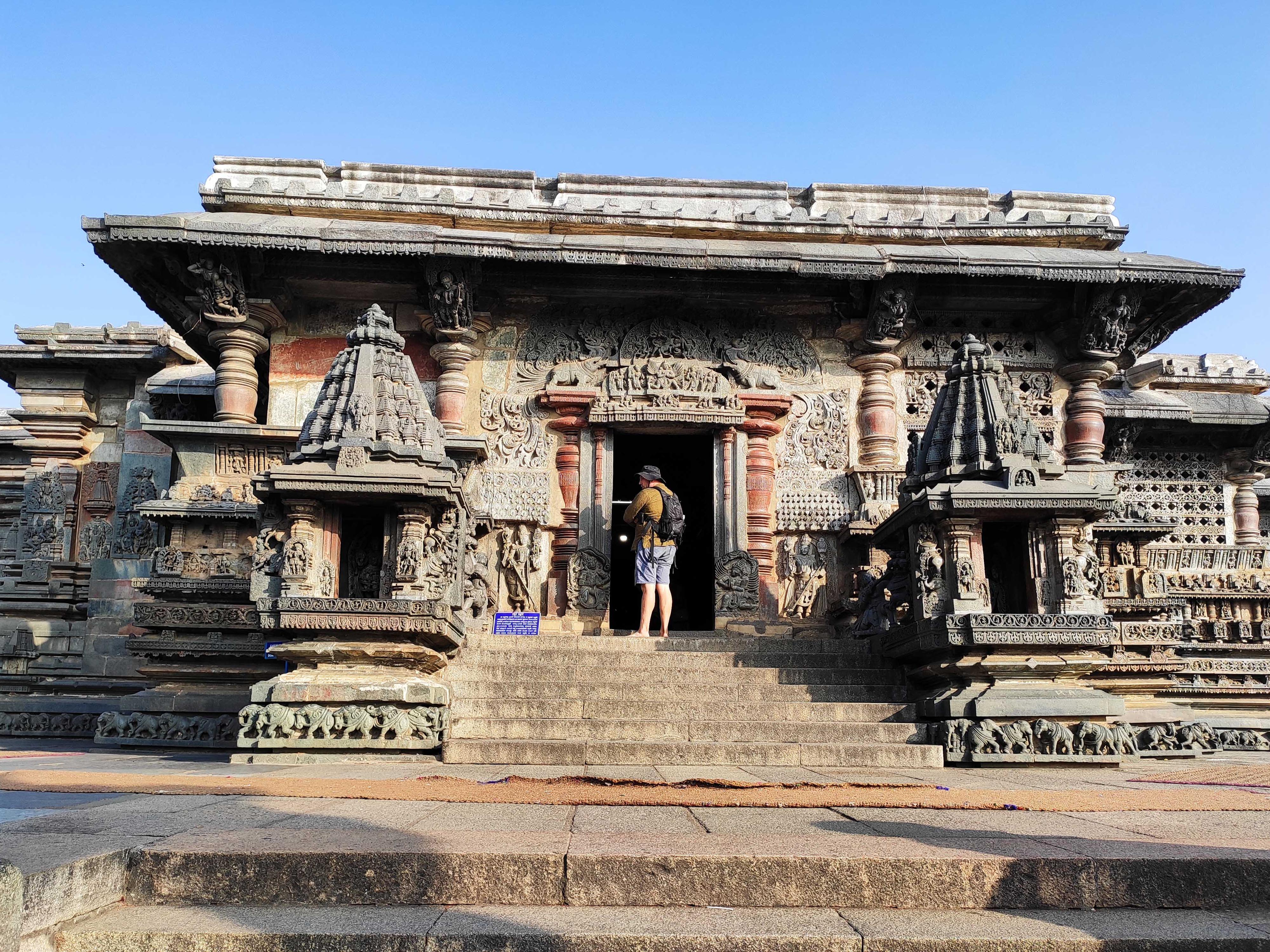
Small Bhumija-style shrines flanking the step before the main Belur temple, Karnakata

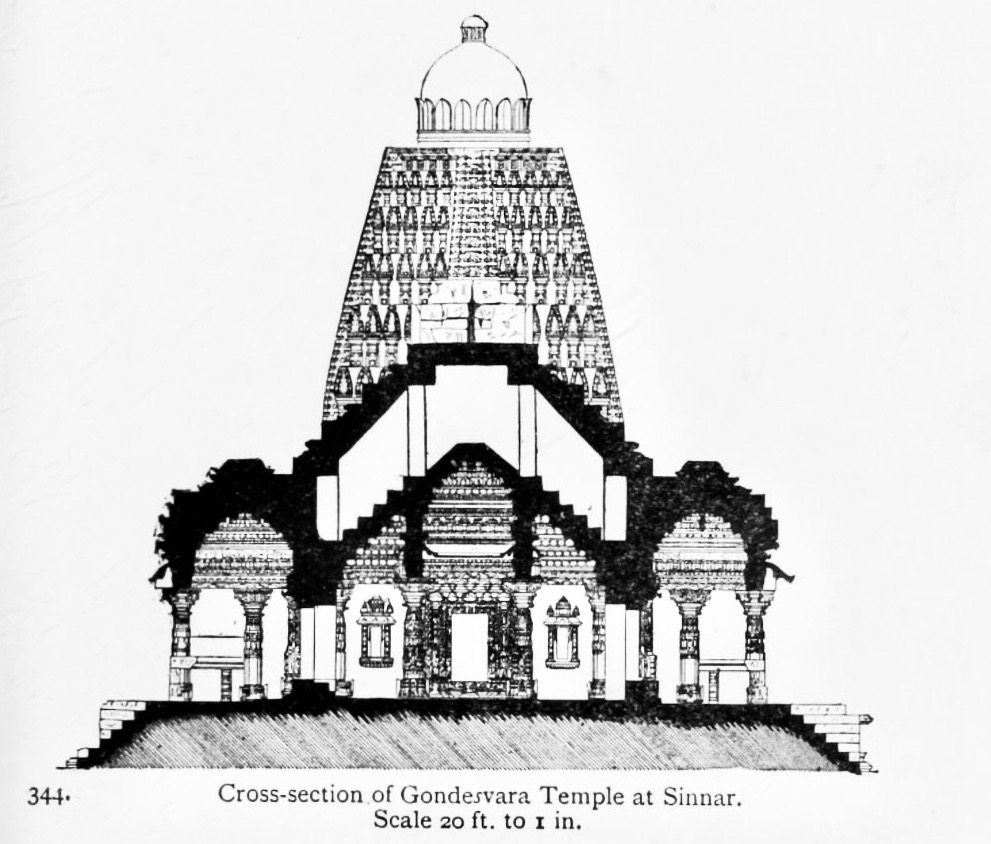
The Bhumija shikara of Gondesvara Temple
