= Mankeshwar temple, Zodage =

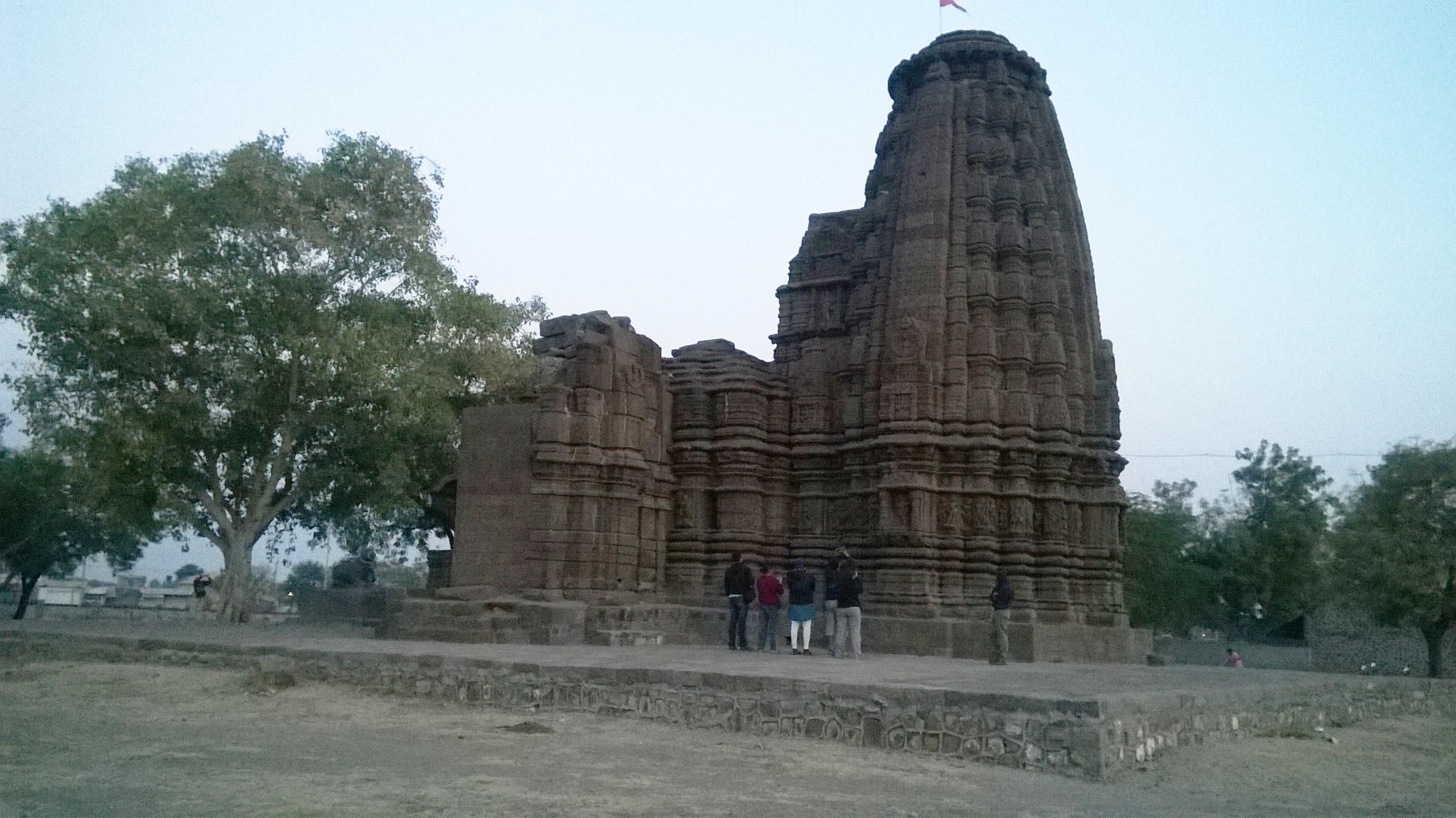
- Mankeshwar temple, Zodage

- Location in Maharashtra

Religion
- Affiliation: Hinduism
- District: Nashik district
- Deity: Shiva
- Festival: Mahashivratri

Location
- Location: Zodage
- State: Maharashtra
- Country: India
- Interactive map of Mankeshwar temple, Zodage
- Coordinates: 20.657631°N 74.673651°E

Architecture
- Type: Hemadpanthi
- Established: 13th century
- Temple: Good

Mankeshwar temple (Marathi: माणकेश्वर मंदिर) is an ancient Shiva temple. The temple is located adjacent to the Mumbai-Agra National Highway in the village Zodage in Nashik District of Maharashtra, India. Zodage is located 128 km from Nashik.

.

== History ==
It is believed that the temple was built by the Yadavas or the Shilaharas under Chalukya suzerainty.

== Structure ==
The temple covers an area of 5.57 sq mt. There is a sabhamandap with three doors and a (Garbha gruha) sanctum sanctorum. The Mankeshwar temple has carvings in Basalt rock from top to the bottom. There is a Nandi(Bull) carved in stone in front of the temple As it is a Shiva temple, many sculptures of Shiva can be seen on the temple. The temple has an open ardhamandap, leading to the mandapa, subsidiary shrines, antaral and the main garbhagriha . The roof of the Mandapa and Ardhamandapa are currently missing. There is an image of Lord Shiva in the shrine. The sculpture of Chamunda can be seen here. Ashtadikpal (the lords of the eight directions), Bhairav and Vishnu, also add to the beauty of the temple. The exterior of the temple is adorned with beauties. Musician, Darpana, Nupurpadika, Matrika, Frog (scared of frogs), Shatrumardini, Sword-wielding Maneka, Woman and scorpion, Dancer Lady, Sursundari disturbed by hoarseness The temple is adorned with beauties such as a beautician, a lady removing thorns from legs, a Kamayani, a writer, a lady spy with a snake in her hand, Lady playing conch shells and lady leaving her hair loose. The peak is characterized by a terrestrial style with a replica of small peaks, it is a typical charascteristic of Bhumij style of architecture. The face of the man in the circle at the center of the diamond head is called Kirtimukh. The temple is adorned with sixteen such Kirtimukhas. On the front side of the temple, one above the other Kirtimukh dignifies the distinctiveness of the temple. In front of the temple is another Bhumij style ruined temple. It is also called the Saraswati Temple. The idol in the temple is missing. There is a pond across the highway in front of the temple. There is an inscription about the construction of the pond by a local merchant.

== Narratives ==
The temple is also closely associated with lives of Shiva.

== Fair ==
A fair is held every year in the Hindu calendar month of Magha on 13th day.

== Gallery ==
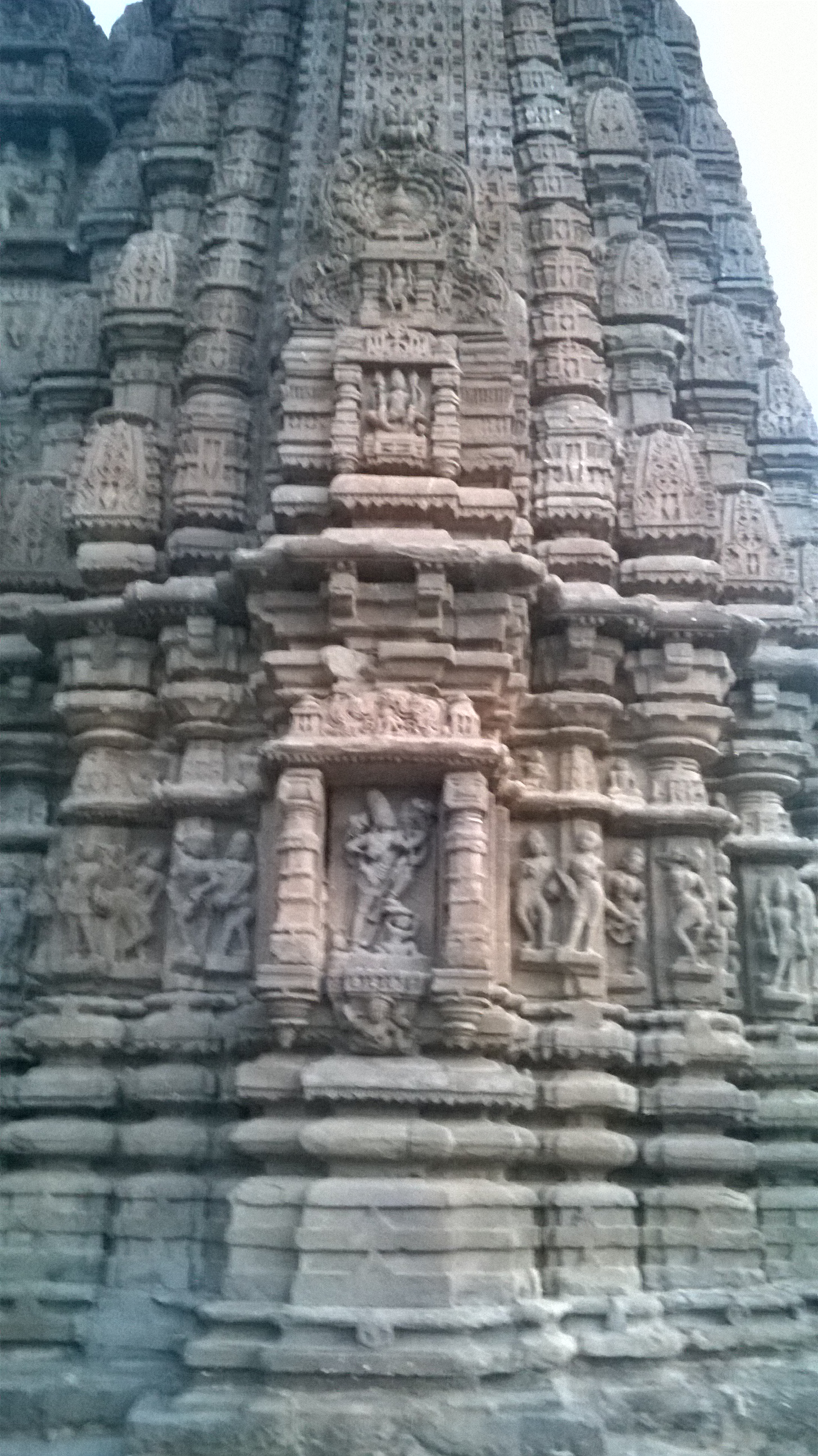
Sculptures

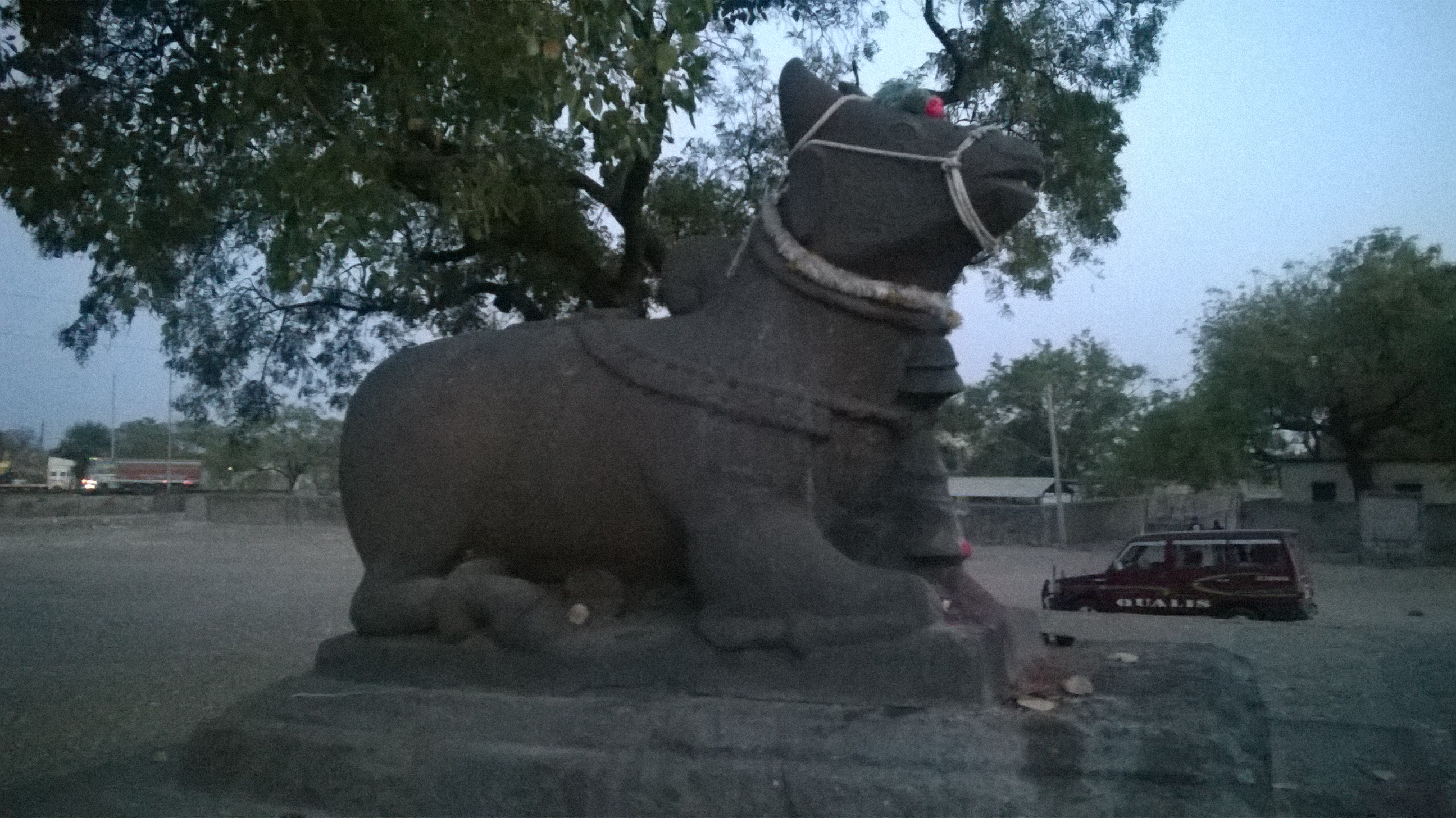
Nandi
