= Nīlakaṇṭheśvara temple =

Coordinates: 23°54′03″N 78°03′26″E

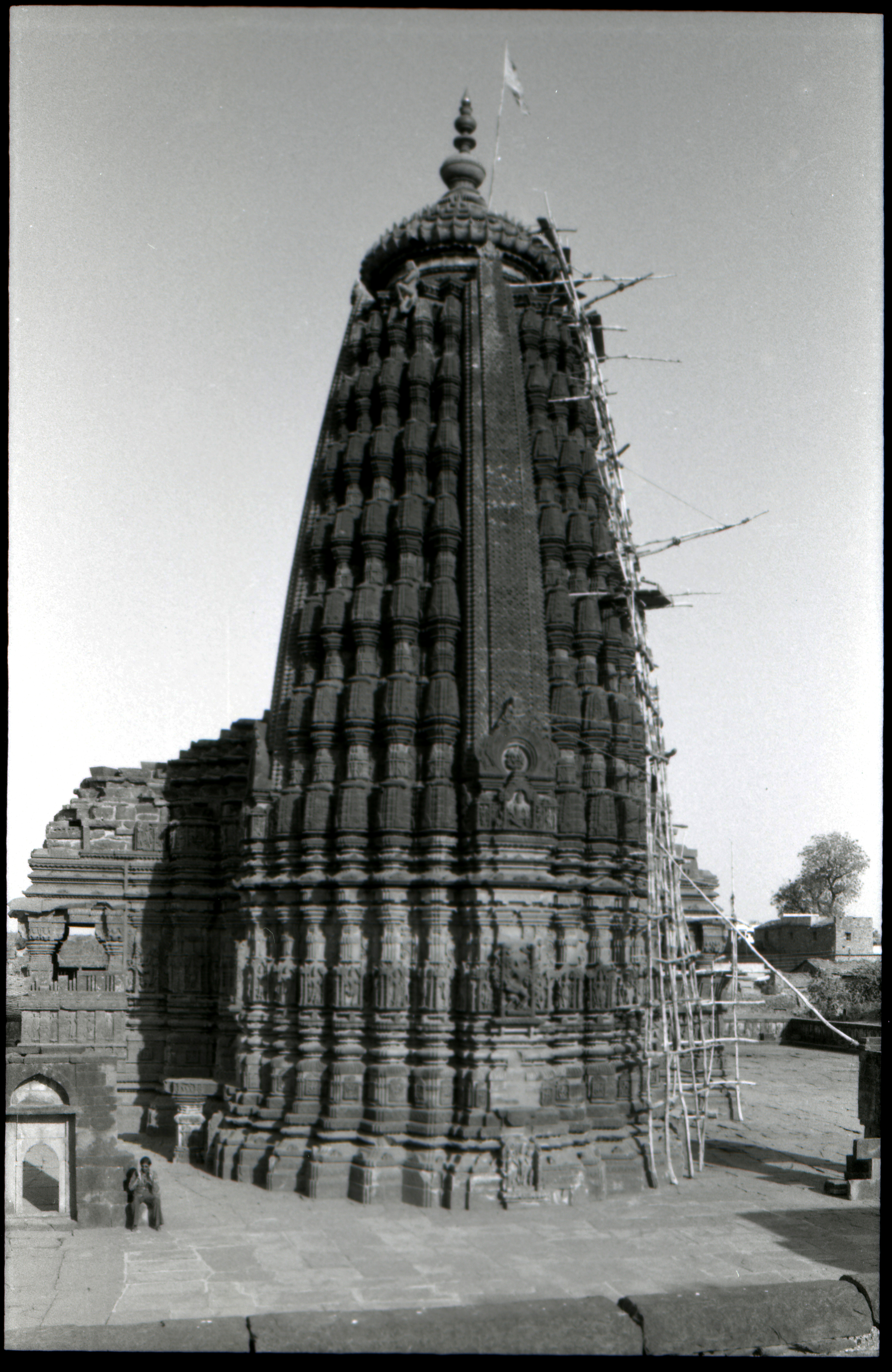
Nīlakaṇṭheśvara temple from the west, as documented in 1982.

The Nīlakaṇṭheśvara temple is a large medieval temple dedicated to Śiva in the town of Udaypur, in the state of Madhya Pradesh, India. The temple is a Monument of National Importance under the Archaeological Survey of India, numbered N-MP-289. The temple, also known as the Udayeśvara Temple, was built by king Udayaditya in c. 1070–1093 CE. It is the only surviving royal temple of the Paramara kings.

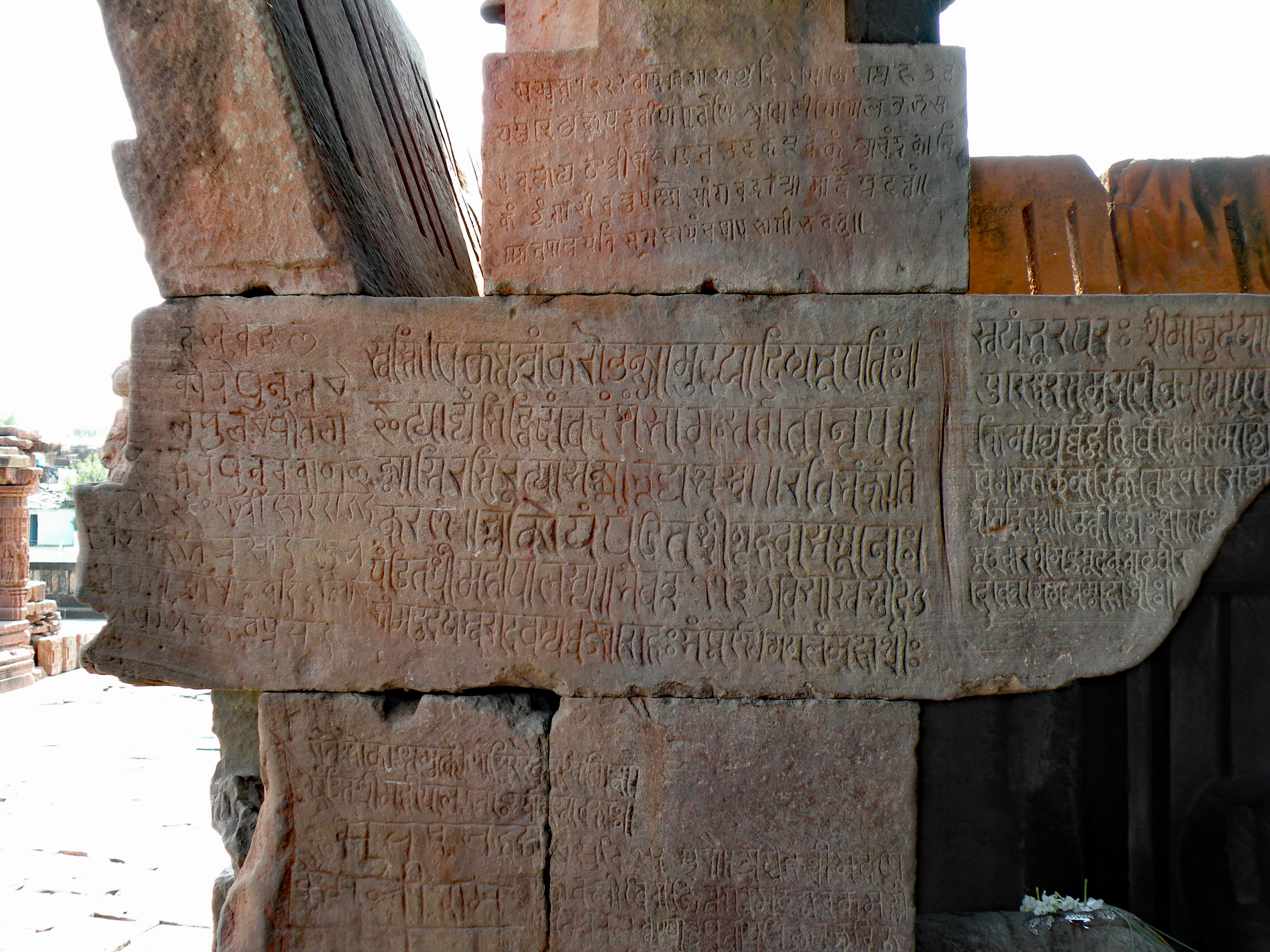
Dedicatory inscription of the temple, on a lintel in the entrance porch, dated VS 1137.

== Dedicatory inscription ==
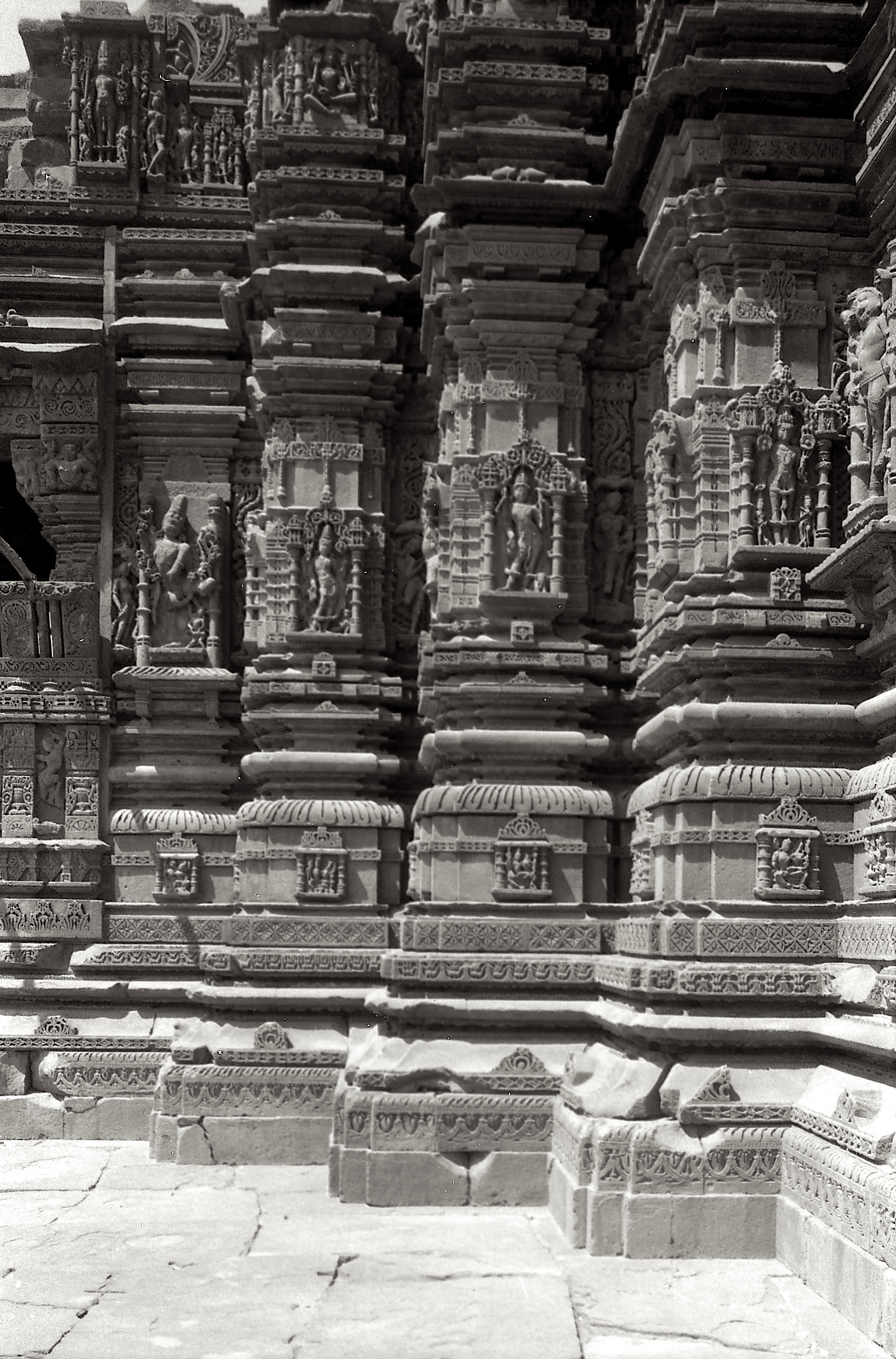
The temple exterior of the sanctum showing mouldings and niches with Śaiva deities, 1982.

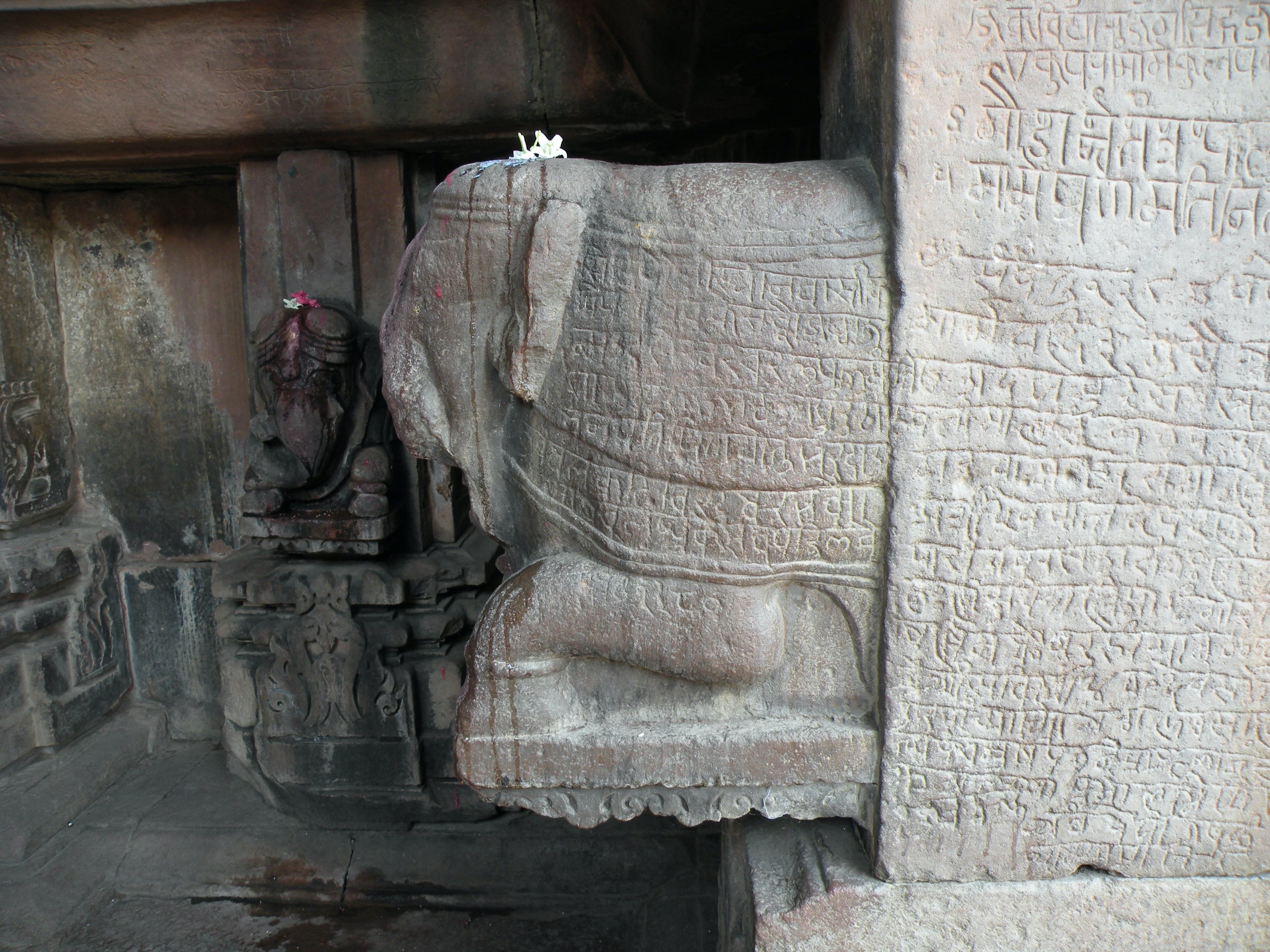
A sample of the votive and pilgrim inscriptions inside the eastern entrance.

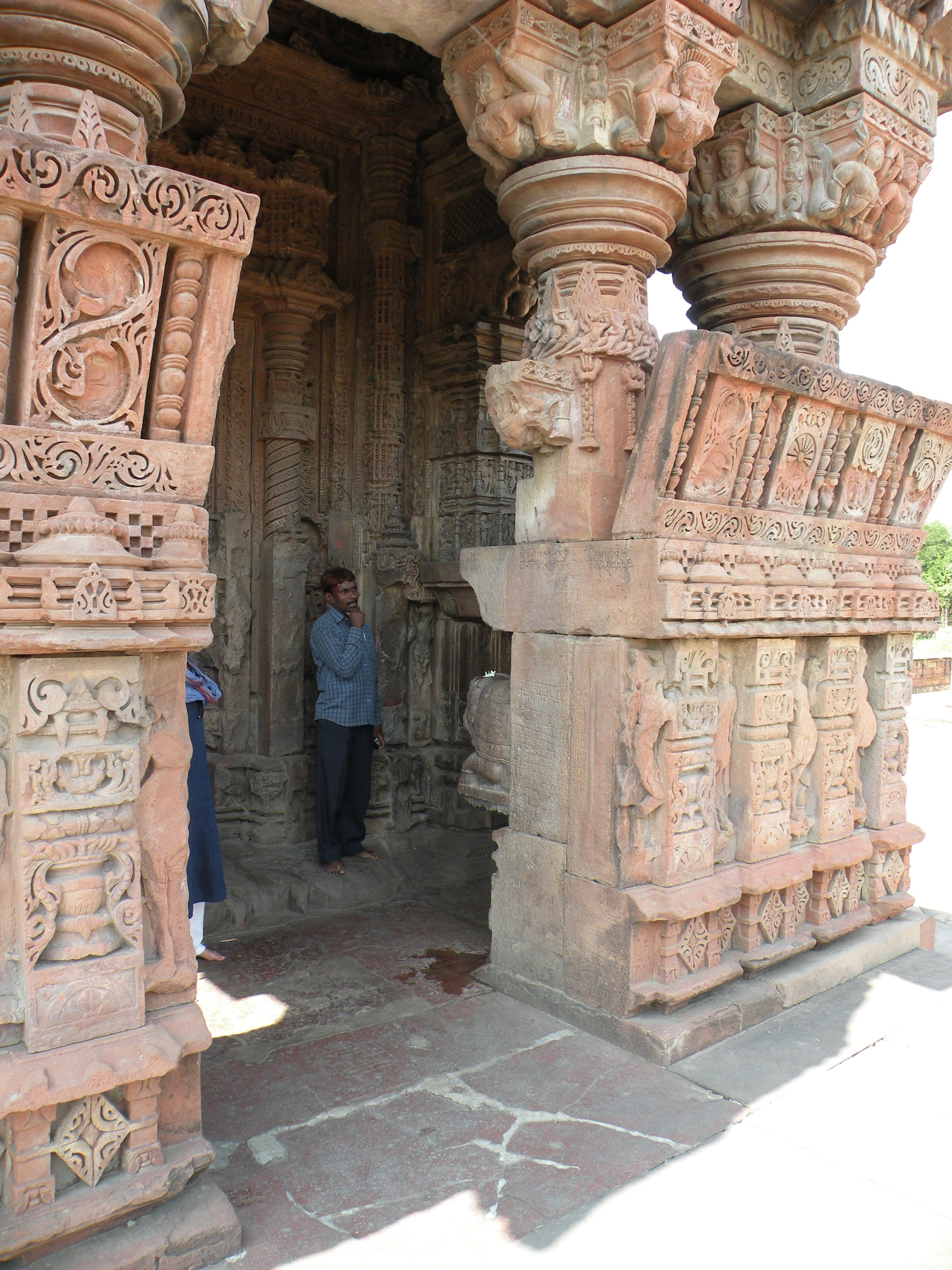
Eastern entrance porch, engraved with a host of pilgrim and votive records.

An inscription in the eastern porch records the building of the temple in Vikrama Saṃvat 1137 or 1080-81 CE.

The translation of the text is as follows:

Left half:

From every quarter, O King, we recite the Veda that is primordial and the bestower of siddhis, so that the lord of the earth, Udayāditya, may bring the earth under a single umbrella. Upon his head the earth prospers, thus he is renowned as the Earth-Bearer.

At the sun’s passage (into another zodiac?). This is the verse of Paṇḍita Mahīpāla, son of Paṇḍita Gṛhavāsa. Saṃvat 1137 on the bright fortnight of Vaiśākha. Completion of the raising of the flag of Śrī Udayeśvaradeva. May there be auspiciousness! May there be great fortune!

Right half:

It was the celebrated one who has no superior, the Self-Born (Śiva), who ordained that the city, lord, ocean, etc. of the lord of the earth, Udayāditya, have the epithet ‘Udaya’. What is the use of many other Vedas? What is the use of many other hymns of praise? Extol the Veda that has but one ruler; it grants success in all things. The verses were engraved by sūtradhāra Dhīradev, brother of the illustrious Madhusūdana. May there be auspiciousness! May there be great fortune!

Annex below: These verses—engraved by sūtradhāra Dhīradev and composed by Paṇḍita Śrī Mahīpāla—are fit for all things.

== Architecture ==
Although of the same date as some of the buildings at Khajuraho, architecturally speaking, the temple spire belongs to a class known as bhūmija, or 'earth born,' a mode of temple construction that originated in the Mālwa region. Other temples of this type are found at Nemawar and Un (Khargone district).

== Iconography ==
The complex Śaiva iconography of the temple was studied by Doria Tichit. Subsequently a detailed analysis was prepared by Anupa Pande and published in 2018. In 2023, Saurabh Saxena published an richly-illustrated study in Puratattva, accessible online.

== Votive and pilgrim inscriptions ==
The temple is unique in north India for the many inscriptions on and in the building, with a particular concentration being found in the eastern entrance. In addition to the consecration record, located on a lintel on the left (south side) of the porch and dated Vikrama year 1137 or 1080-81 CE in the time of Udayāditya, the porch carries more than sixty votive records. Not yet studied in a systematic fashion, these form a continuous sequence from the time of the Paramāras – Devapāla (circa 1218–39 CE) is mentioned – through the period of the Tughluq dynasty, the Mughals and their successors.

An early votive record from the time of the Tughluqs is dated Vikrama year 1394 (1323-24 CE) and records the homage paid by two brahamins named Mādhava and Keśava. It is engraved on the sculpture of an elephant just inside the entrance (see figures). Another important inscription, documenting the co-existence Hindu and Muslim religious activities at the site, mentions a festival (yātrā) of the god Udaleśvara in 1338, the same year as the Tughluq inscription recording the construction of the mosque in the temple precinct. For the Tugluq inscription, see Tughluq Shāhī mosque, Udaypur, Madhya Pradesh. Udaleśvara is a local spelling of Udayeśvara, the main deity in the temple, named eponymously after the Paramāra king Udayāditya.
