= Galteshwar Temple =

Galteshwar Mahadev Temple
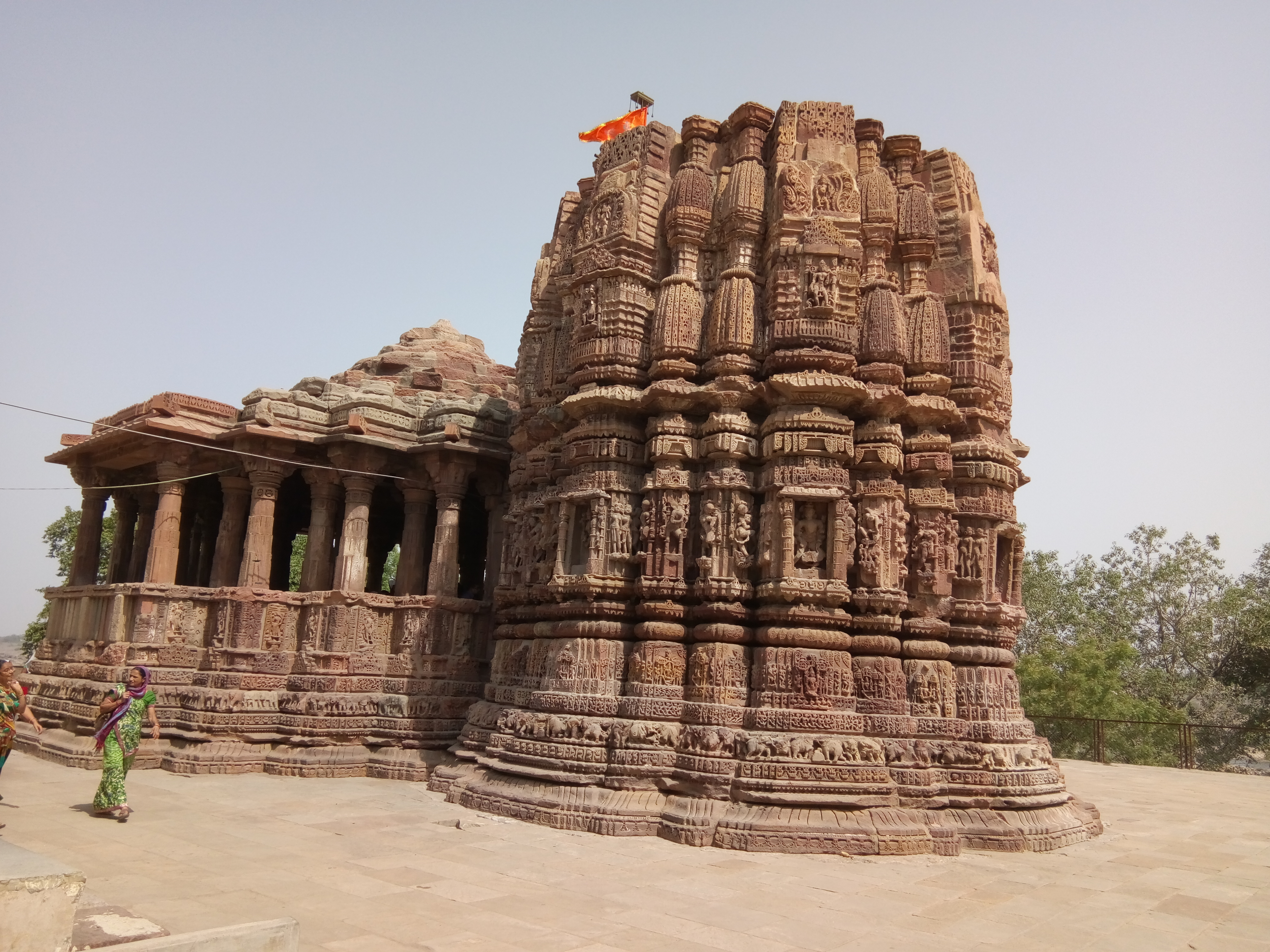
- General view of the temple from northeast corner

- Location in Gujarat

Religion
- Affiliation: Hinduism
- Deity: Shiva

Location
- Location: Sarnal village near Dakor, Kheda district, Gujarat
- Interactive map of Galteshwar Mahadev Temple
- Coordinates: 22.7850416°N 73.2774858°E

Architecture
- Type: Māru-Gurjara architecture with Malwa influence
- Completed: 12th century (Chaulukya period)
- Temple: 1

The Galteshwar is a Hindu temple dedicated to Shiva, located at Sarnal village near Dakor in Kheda district, Gujarat, India. The 12th century temple is unique in its style and of its period because it is built in central Indian Malwa style, bhumija, without influence of Paramara architecture and with influence of Gujarati Chaulukya architecture. It has a square garbhagriha (shrine proper) as well as octagonal mandapa (dancing hall).

== Location ==
The temple is located at the confluence of the Galta or Galti and Mahi rivers near Sarnal village. The temple received its name from the Galta river.

== History ==
The temple is associated with Galav, the Rishi from Puranas and a devoted king Chandrahas from Hindu mythology.

Hasmukh Sankalia has identified it with the Chalukya architecture based on its circular shrine proper, crucifix-form dancing hall and the ornamentation. Madhusudan Dhaky disputed it and mentioned the Gujarati architectural influence in shikhara and moldings and decorations on its basement and wall proper. Dhaky opines that the temple may have been constructed by someone who did not have first-hand information of the bhumija style of Malwa and rather depended on the Gujarat texts which treats bhumija style in Gujarati architecture. Aparajtaprccha is one such 12th century Gujarati text based on the Malwa text Samarangana Sutradhara. So the temple must have been constructed in the 12th century. The moldings, decorations, and the sculptures resemble the Kumarapala Temple at Somnath and other shrines built in 12th century during the reign of the Chaulukya ruler Kumarapala.

The temple is the Monument of National Importance (N-GJ-144) protected by the Archaeological Survey of India (ASI).

The shikhara as well as the mandapa of the temple collapsed in 1908. The restoration of shikhara was completed by ASI in September 2021.

== Architecture ==
The Galteshwar temple is a bhumija style temple which is rarest known of Gujarat. The bhumija style was the popular style in the regions under the rule of Malwa. The temple is also rare ashtabhadra or ashtashala plan bhumija temple found rarely even in central India such as the temple at Arang. The temple is completely devoid of the Paramara influence. The temple is nirandhara type having the garbhagriha (shrine proper) and the mandapa (dancing hall).

=== Garbhagriha ===
The shrine proper is located lower to the level of the mandapa and is square from inside. From outside, the shrine is circular with a diameter of 24 feet with numerous projections and recesses. The recesses have seven niches with the images of Dikpalas, the guardian deities of the eight directions. The front wall of the shrine proper is carved with ornamentation and figures which include different forms of Shiva which are now badly mutilated. The doorway is profusely ornamented with rupastambhas of Abu style. The figures and carvings include gandharvas, ascetics, horse riders, elephant riders, chariots, palanquins and the events of life, from birth to death.

=== Mandapa ===
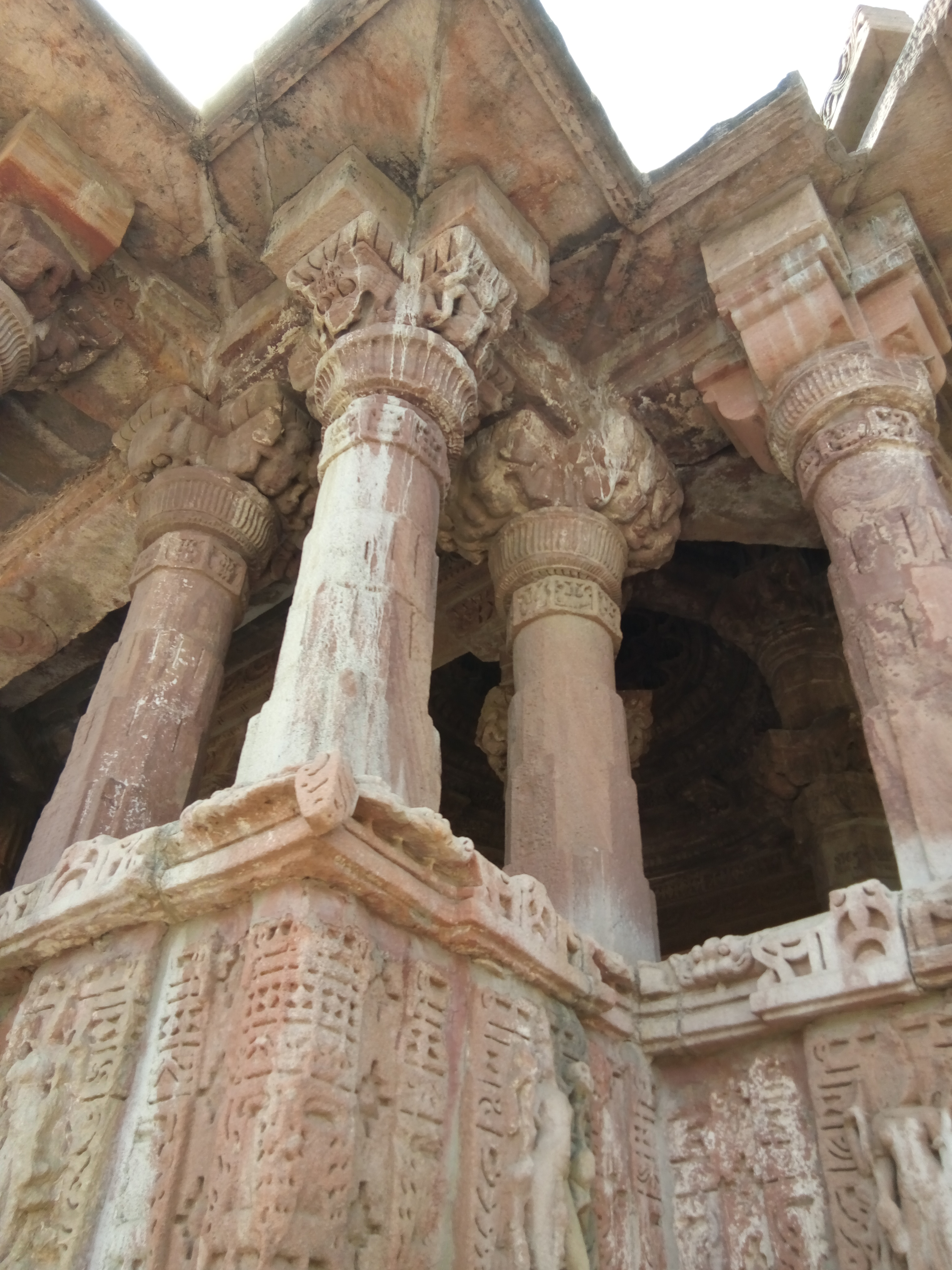
Pillars of the mandapa

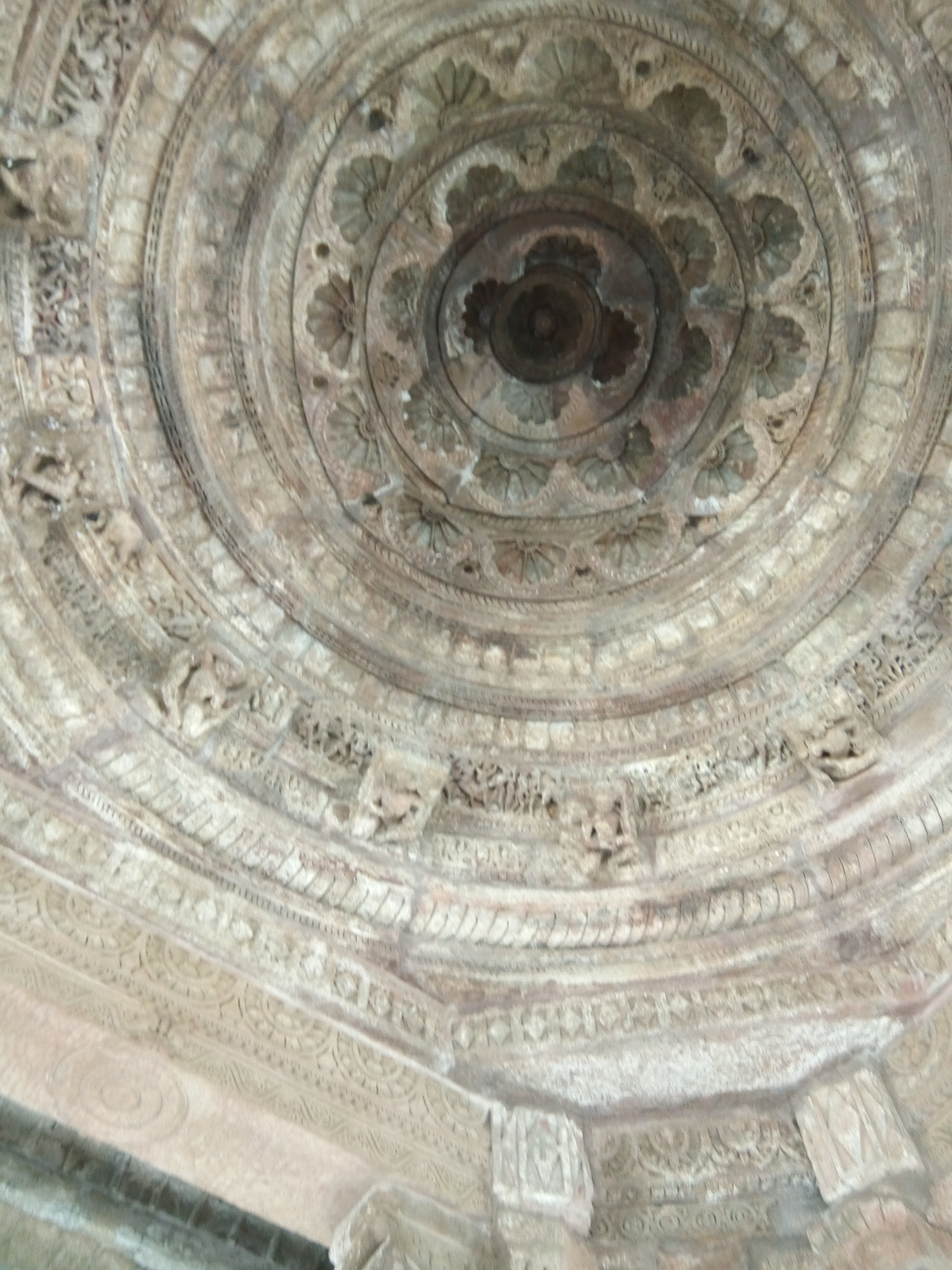
Karotaka, circular ceiling with Gajtalu and Karnadardarika

The eight-sided mandapa has several projecting angles similar to Chaulukya temples in Gujarat like the sun temple of Modhera, Somnath temple and Sejakpur temple. The mandapa is in the crucifix form. It has three bhujas instead of usual two bhujas in the rear part.

There are eight inner pillars and sixteen outer smaller pillars which supports the roof of the mandapa. The smaller pillars have the smaller shaft, capital, and the brackets. The inner pillars have a square base with cut corners followed by two small necks. It is followed by the square shaft for the one-third height of the pillar, then octagonal for the half of the height of the pillar, then smaller sixteen sided shaft and then a circular shaft decorated with a band of the kirtimukhas. It is crowned by the capital with dripping leaves ornamentation separated from the shaft by the narrow neck. The brackets have dwarfs and the kirtimukhas. The sub-capital is vase shaped and the brackets is ornamented with dwarfs and volutes. They do not have padmashila carving. The shikhara was also bhumija in interpretation and Gujarat style components such as kutastambhikas and shringas. The surasenaka of bhumija styled shikhara is also present but its morphology is different than the Paramara style.

== Gallery ==
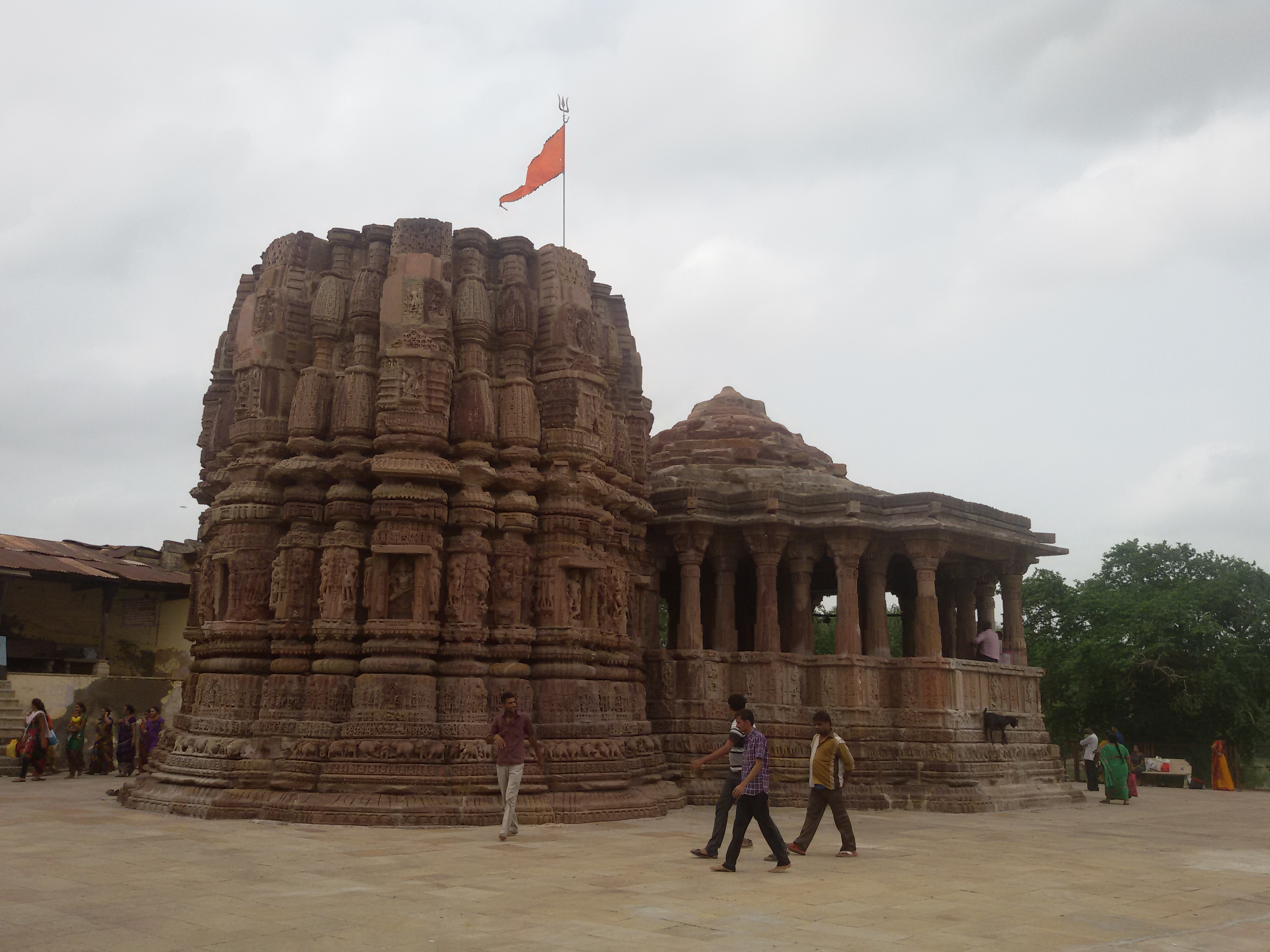
General view of the temple

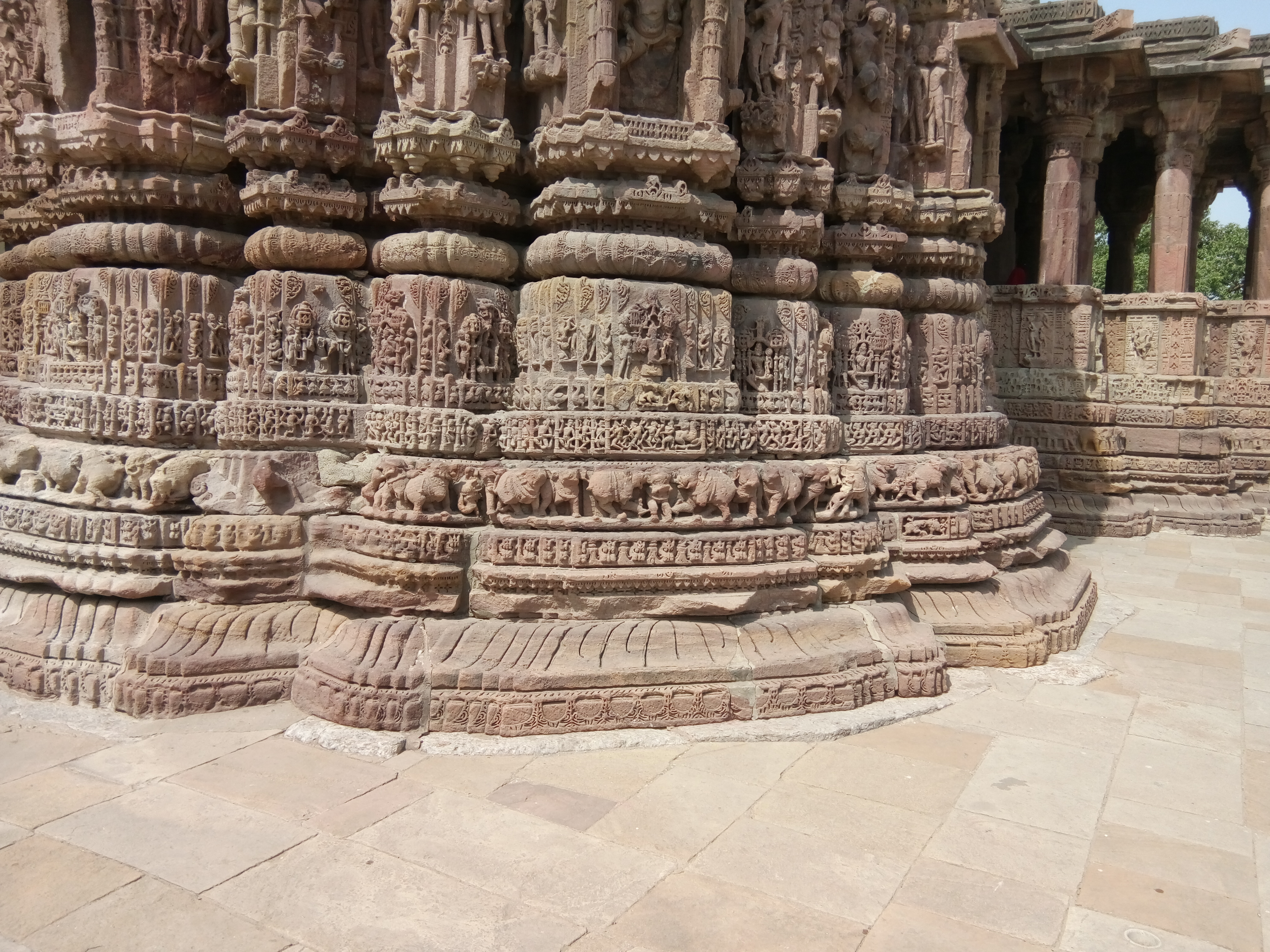
Adhisthana (base) of the temple

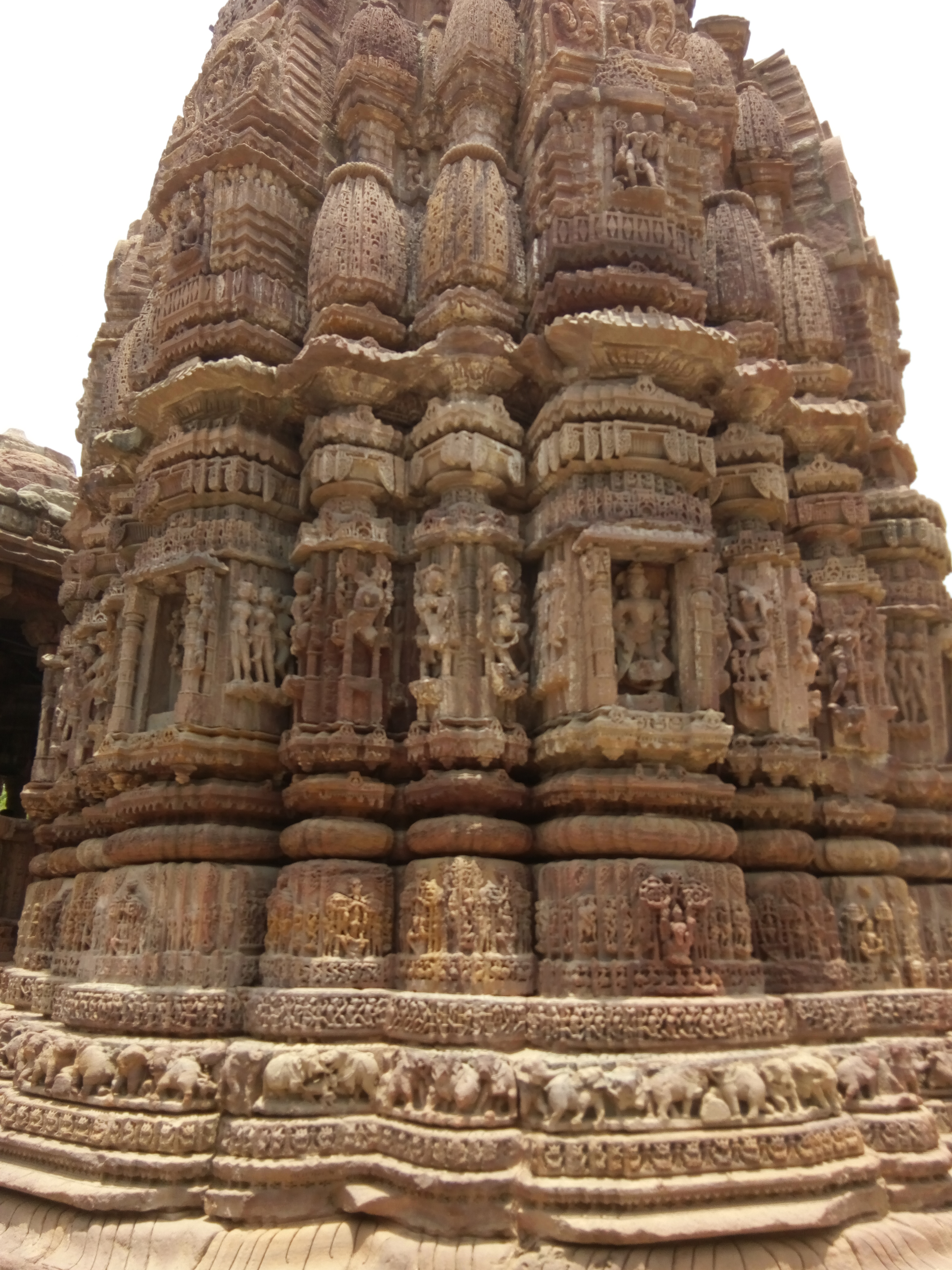
Back view of Garbhagriha

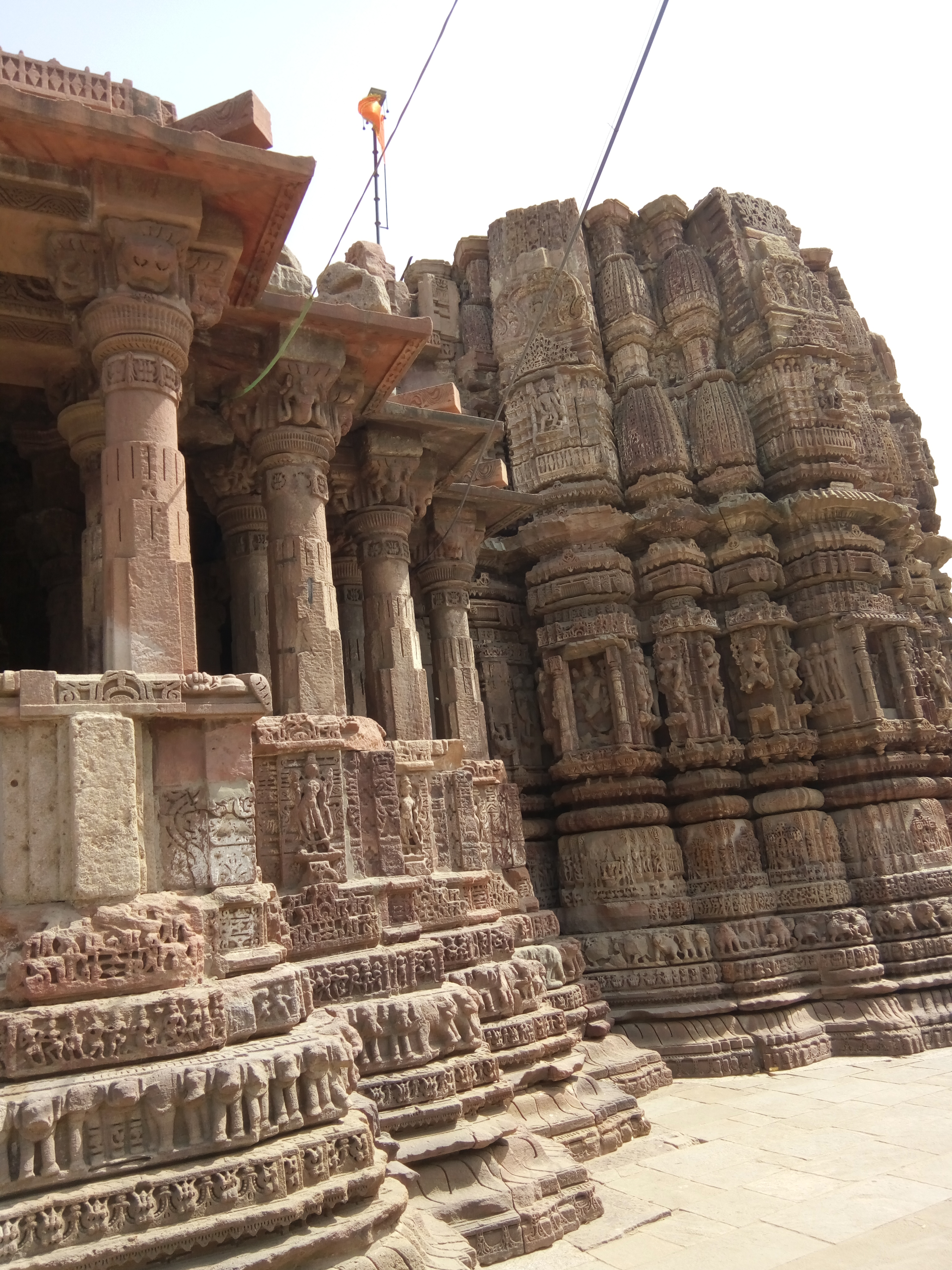
Mandapa pillars of the left

== Culture ==
Two fairs are held at Galteshwar every year, on Janmashtami and on Sharad Purnima. The temple is visited by large number of devotees on Mahashivaratri.
