= Manik Rai =

7th century Rajput ruler of Ajmer, India

Manik Rai is a 7th century king from Ajmer, India.

According to the bardic tradition, Manik Rai was the brother of Dula Rai, the Chauhan king of Ajmer. In 684 CE, he fled from Ajmer after Dula Rai was killed by their enemies. He managed to gain control of the area around Sambhar Lake with the blessings of the goddess Shakambhari.

Historian R. B. Singh identifies Manik Rai as Samantaraja, the 7th century Chahamana ruler of Shakambhari.
