= Chauhan dynasty =

Clan that ruled parts of northern India in the medieval period

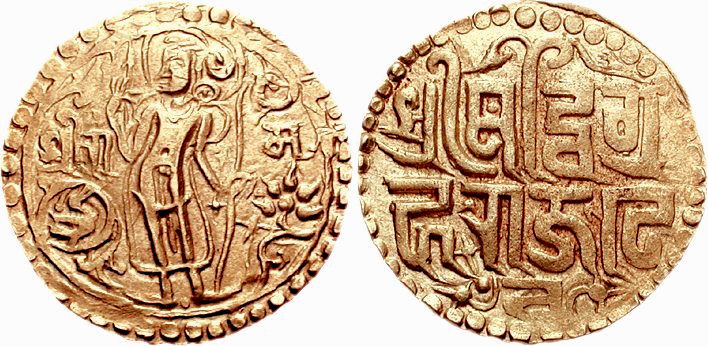
- Gold Dinar of Vigraharaja IV
- Country: States ruled by Chauhans: Shakambhari; Ranastambhapura; Dhami; Jalor; Raghogarh; Bundi; Patna; Sambalpur; Sonepur; Changbhakar; Korea; Naddula; Kota; Sirohi; Vav; Tulsipu; Partabgarh
- Founded: 551; 1475 years ago
- Founder: Chahamana (mythical); Vasudeva (historical)
- Current head: Digvijaya Singh (Raghogarh); Ijyaraj Singh (Kotah); Bhupesh Singh (Bundi); Kanak Vardhan Singh Deo (Patna)
- Final ruler: Hariraja (main line)
- Titles: Traditional titles: Maharajadhiraja of Shakambhari; Rana of Ranastambhapura; Maharao of Bundi; Maharao of Kota; Rana Dhami; Raja of Jalor; Raja of Raghogarh; Raja of Patna; Raja of Sambalpur; Raja of Sonepur; Raja of Changbhakar; Raja of Korea; Rao of Naddula; Rao of Sirohi; Rao of Vav; Thakur of Tulsipu; Taluqdar of Partabgarh
- Dissolution: 1194 (main line)
- Cadet branches: Hada Chauhan; Deora Chauhan

The Chauhan dynasty are a dynasty associated with various ruling Rajput families in the present-day Indian state of Rajasthan from seventh century onwards.

== Subclans ==
Khichi, Hada, Songara, Bhadauria, Devda (Clan), Nirban etc. are the branches or subclans of Chauhan Rajputs.

== Origin ==
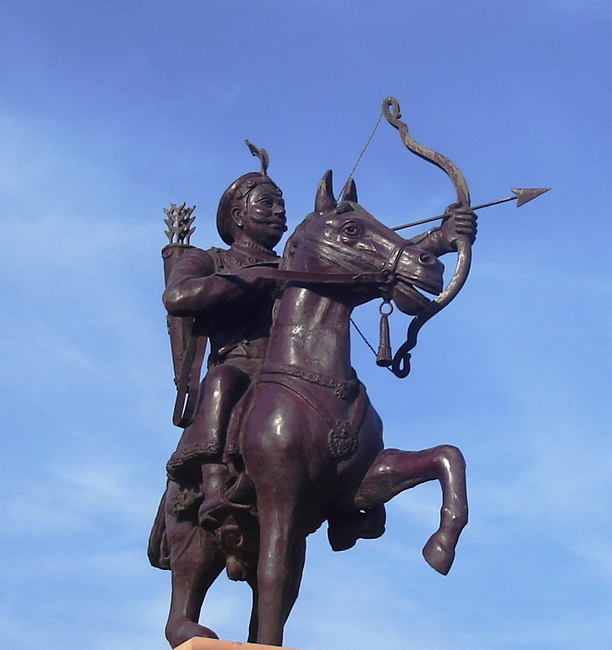
Prithviraj III, who fought in the first and Second Battle of Tarain from 1191 to 1192.

The word Chauhan is the vernacular form of the Sanskrit term Chahamana (IAST: Cāhamāna). Several Chauhan inscriptions name a legendary hero called Chahamana as their ancestor, but none of them state the period in which he lived.

The earliest known ruler of the dynasty was Vasudeva. According to the Prabandha-Kosha of the 14th century Jain scholar Rajashekhara Suri, Vasudeva ascended the throne in 551 CE (608 Vikram Samvat). The historical accuracy of this statement is not certain.

The earliest extant inscription that describes the origin of the Chauhans is the 1119 CE Sevadi inscription of Ratnapala, a ruler of the Naddula Chahamana dynasty. According to this inscription, the ancestor of the Chahamanas was born from the eye of Indra.

The 1170 CE Bijolia rock inscription of the Shakambhari Chahamana king Someshvara states that his ancestor Samantaraja was born at Ahichchhatrapura (possibly modern Nagaur) in the gotra of sage Vatsa. The 1262 CE Sundha hill inscription of the Jalor Chahamana king Chachiga-deva states that the dynasty's ancestor Chahamana was "a source of joy" to the Vatsa. The 1320 Mount Abu (Achaleshwar temple) inscription of the Deora Chauhan ruler Lumbha states that Vatsa created the Chahamanas as a new lineage of warriors, after the solar dynasty and the lunar dynasty had ceased to exist.

The Ajmer inscription of the Shakambhari Chahamana ruler Vigraharaja IV (c. 1150–64 CE) claims that Chahamana belonged to the solar dynasty, descending from Ikshavaku and Rama. The 12th-century Prithviraja Vijaya mahakavya, composed by Prithviraja III's court poet Jayanaka, also claims a solar dynasty origin for the ruling dynasty. According to this text, Chahamana came to earth from Arkamandal (the orbit of the sun).

The 15th-century Hammira Mahakavya of Nayachandra Suri, which describes the life of the Ranthambore branch ruler Hammira, gives the following account: Once Brahma was wandering in search of an auspicious place to conduct a ritual sacrifice. He ultimately chose the place where a lotus from his hand fell; this place came to be known as Pushkara. Brahma wanted to protect his sacrificial ceremony against interference from danavas (miscreant beings). Therefore, he remembered the Sun, and a hero came into being from the sun's orb. This hero was Chohan, the ancestor of the Hammira's dynasty. The earliest extant recension of Prithviraj Raso of Chand Bardai, dated to 15th or 16th century, states that the first Chauhan king – Manikya Rai – was born from Brahma's sacrifice. The 16th-century Surjana-Charita, composed by the Bengali poet Chandra Shekhara under patronage of the Ranthambore ruler Rao Surjana, contains a similar account. It states that Brahma created the first Chahamana from the Sun's disc during a sacrificial ceremony at Pushkara.

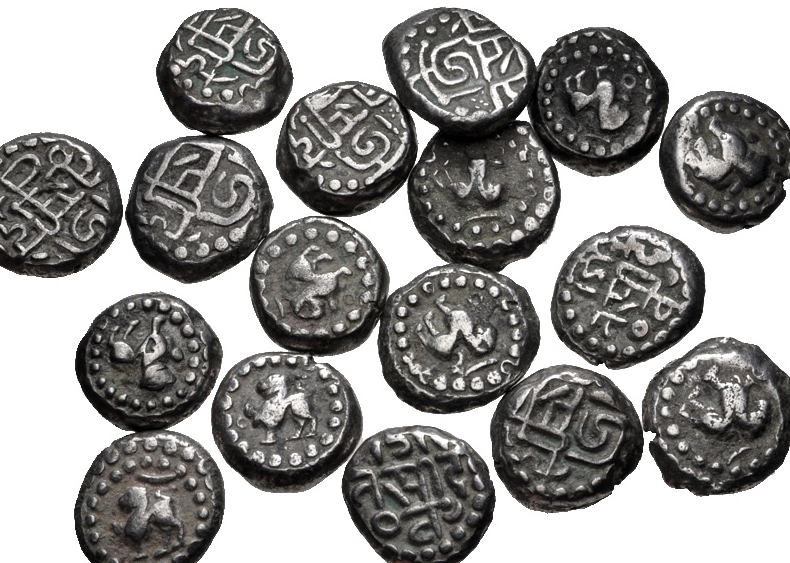
Drachms of the Chahamanas of Ranastambhapura. 1192–1301 CE

Despite these earlier myths, it was the Agnivanshi (or Agnikula) myth that became most popular among the Chauhans and other Rajput clans. According to this myth, some of the Rajput clans originated from Agni, in a sacrificial fire pit. This legend was probably invented by the 10th-century Paramara court poet Padmagupta, whose Nava-sahasanka-charita mentions only the Paramaras as fire-born. The inclusion of Chauhans in the Agnivanshi myth can be traced back to the later recensions of Prithviraj Raso. In this version of the legend, once Vashistha and other great sages begin a major sacrificial ceremony on Mount Abu. The ritual was interrupted by miscreant daityas (demons). To get rid of these demons, Vashistha created progenitors of three Rajput dynasties from the sacrificial fire pit. These were Parihar (Pratiharas), Chaluk (Chaulukya or Solanki), and Parmar (Paramara). These heroes were unable to defeat the demons. So, the sages prayed again, and this time a fourth warrior appeared: Chahuvana (Chauhan). This fourth hero slayed the demons.

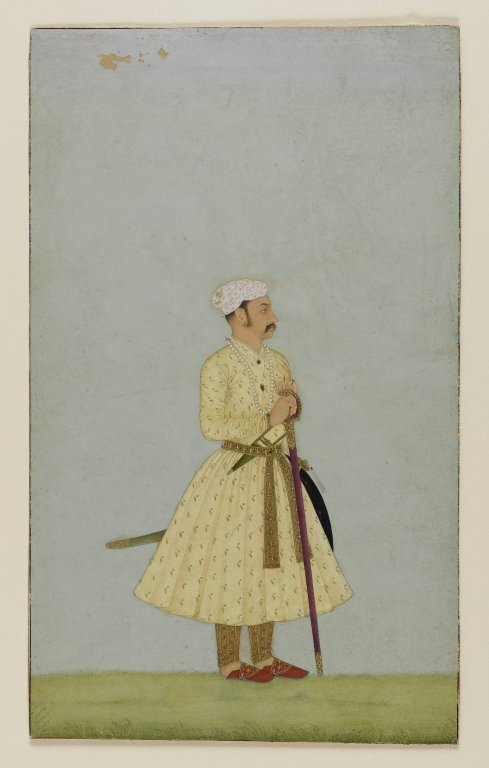
Rao Raja Chattar Sal of Bundi supported Dara Shikoh in the Mughal war of succession of 1658–1659.

The earliest available copies of Prithviraj Raso do not mention the Agnivanshi legend. It is possible that the 16th-century bards came up with the legend to foster Rajput unity against the Mughal emperor Akbar. Adaptions of the Prithviraj Raso occur in several later works. The Hammira Raso (1728) by Jodharaja, a court poet of prince Chandrabhana of Neemrana, states that once the Kshatriyas (warriors) became extinct. So, the great sages assembled at Mount Abu and created three heroes. When these three heroes could not defeat the demons, they created Chahuvanaji. A slight variation occurs in the writings of Surya Malla Mishrana, the court poet of Bundi. In this version, the various gods create the four heroes on Vashistha's request. According to the bardic tale of the Khichi clan of Chauhans, the Parwar (Paramara) was born from Shiva's essence; the Solankhi (Solanki) or Chaluk Rao (Chaulukya) was born from Brahma's essence; the Pariyar (Parihar) was born from Devi's essence; and the Chahuvan (Chauhan) was born from Agni, the fire.

== History ==
The Chauhans were historically a powerful group in the region now known as Rajasthan. For around 400 years from the 7th century CE their strength in Sambhar was a threat to the power-base of the Guhilots in the south-west of the area, as also was the strength of their fellow Agnivanshi clans. They suffered a set-back in 1192 when their leader, Prithviraj Chauhan, was defeated at the Second Battle of Tarain but this did not signify their demise. The kingdom broke into the Satyapura and Devda branches after the invasion of Qutbu l-Din Aibak in 1197. The 13th and 14th centuries saw the struggle between the Chauhan Rajputs and the Delhi Sultanate to control the strategic areas of Delhi, Punjab and Gujarat.

The earliest Chauhan inscription is a copper-plate inscription found at Hansot.

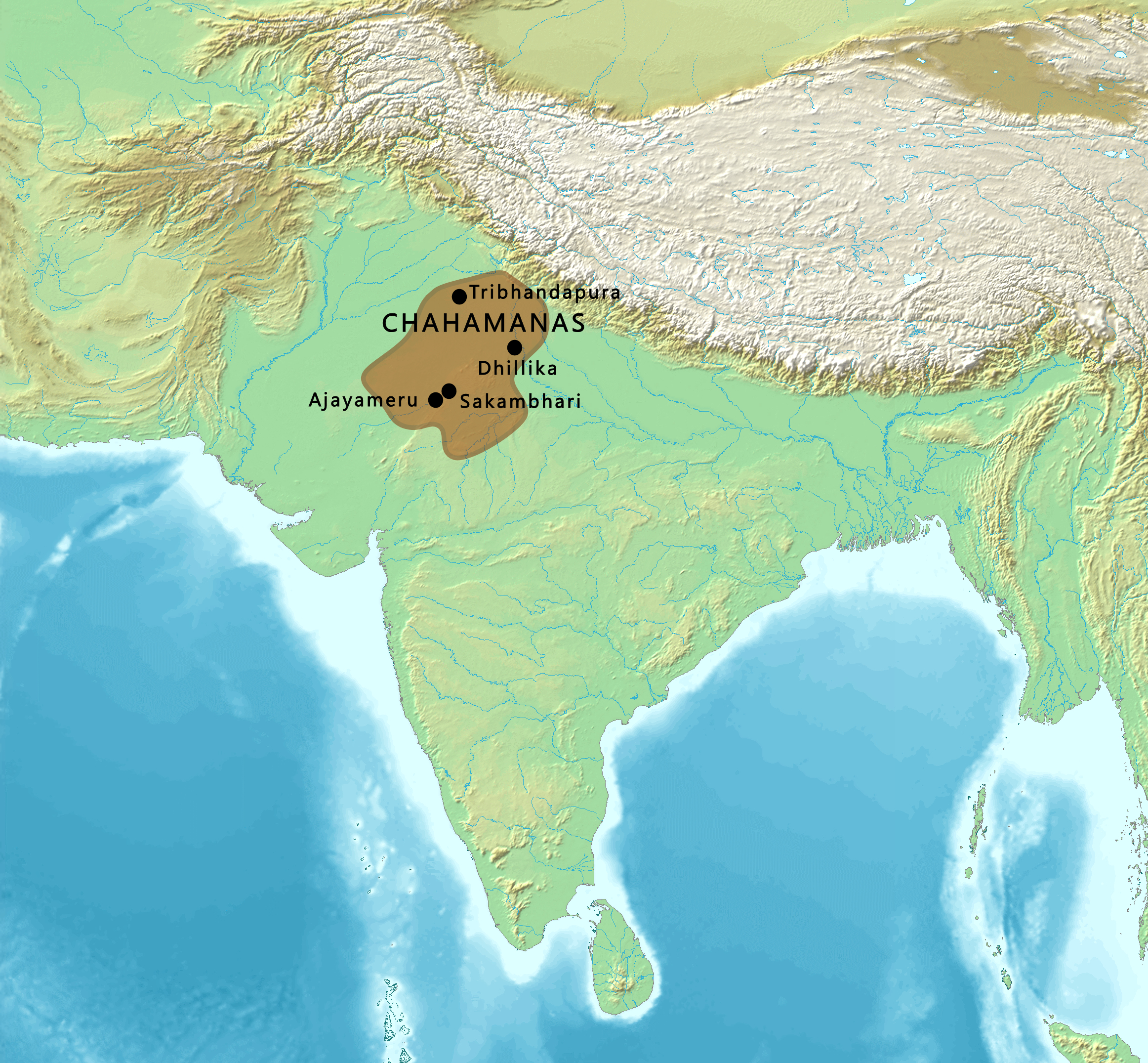
map of the Chahamanas of Shakambhari

== Dynasties and states ==
The ruling dynasties belonging to the Chauhan clan included:

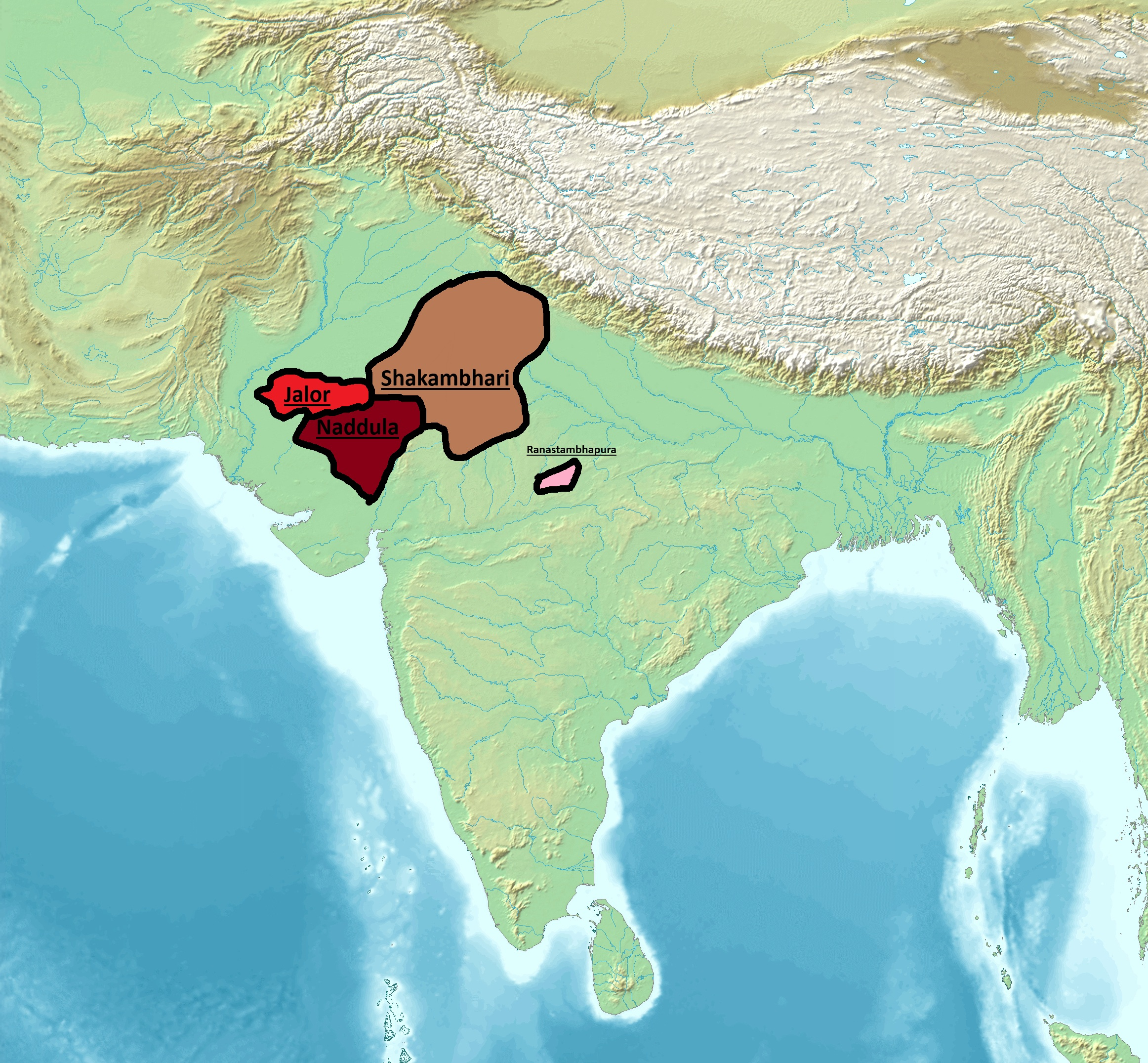
Chahamana states before 1192

=== Early Medieval Period (before 1192) ===
- Chahamanas of Shakambhari (Chauhans of Ajmer)
- Chahamanas of Naddula (Chauhans of Nadol)
- Chahamanas of Jalor (Chauhans of Jalore); branched off from the Chahamanas of Naddula
- Chahamanas of Ranastambhapura (Chauhans of Ranthambore); branched off from the Chahamanas of Shakambhari

=== Late Medieval and early Modern Period (after 1192) ===
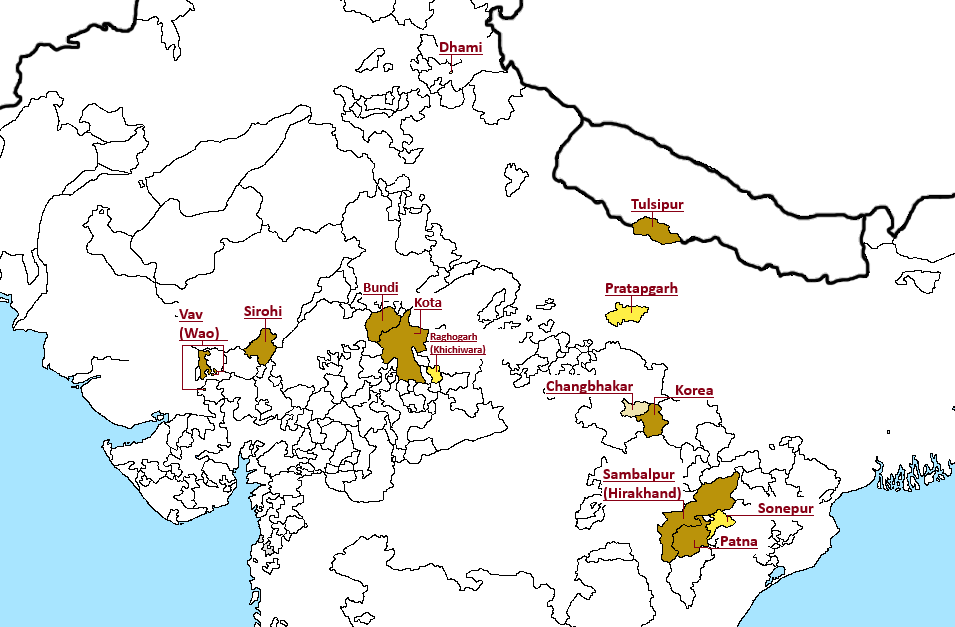
Chahamana states after 1192 ( before 1600; before 1700; after 1700)

==== Rajasthan ====
- Sirohi State
- Bundi State
- Kota State

==== Madhya Pradesh. ====
- Raghogarh State

==== Uttar Pradesh ====
- Tulsipur State
- Partabgarh

==== Gujarat ====
- Vav State

==== Himachal Pradesh ====
- Dhami State

==== Odisha ====
- Sambalpur State
- Sonepur State
- Patna State

==== Chhattisgarh ====
- Sambalpur State
- Changbhakar State
- Korea State

==== Nepal ====
- Tulsipur State

== Rulers ==
=== Shakambhari Branch ===
	Ruler	Reign (CE)
1	Chahamana	(legendary)
2	Vasu-deva	c. 551 CE (disputed)
3	Samanta-raja	684–709
4	Nara-deva	709–721
5	Ajaya-raja I	721–734
6	Vigraha-raja I	734–759
7	Chandra-raja I	759–771
8	Gopendra-raja	771–784
9	Durlabha-raja I	784–809
10	Govinda-raja I alias Guvaka I	809–836
11	Chandra-raja II	836–863
12	Govindaraja II alias Guvaka II	863–890
13	Chandana-raja	890–917
14	Vakpati-raja	917–944
15	Simha-raja	944–971
16	Vigraha-raja II	971–998
17	Durlabha-raja II	998–1012
18	Govinda-raja III	1012–1026
19	Vakpati-raja II	1026–1040
20	Viryarama	1040 (few months)
21	Chamunda-raja	1040–1065
22	Durlabha-raja III alias Duśala	1065–1070
23	Vigraha-raja III alias Visala	1070–1090
24	Prithvi-raja I	1090–1110
25	Ajaya-raja II	1110–1135
26	Arno-raja alias Ana	1135–1150
27	Jagad-deva	1150
28	Vigraha-raja IV alias Visaladeva	1150–1164
29	Apara-gangeya	1164–1165
30	Prithvi-raja II	1165–1169
31	Someshvara	1169–1178
32	Prithviraja III (Rai Pithora)	1177–1192
33	Govinda-raja IV	1192
34	Hari-raja	1193–1194

=== Naddula Branch ===
	Kings	Reign (CE)
1	Lakshmana alias Rao Lakha or Lakhan	950–982
2	Shobhita	982–986
3	Baliraja	986–990
4	Vigrahapala	990–994
5	Mahindra alias Mahindu	994–1015
6	Ashvapala	1015–1019
7	Ahila	1019–1024
8	Anahilla	1024–1055
9	Balaprasada	1055–1070
10	Jendraraja	1070–1080
11	Prithvipala	1080–1090
12	Jojalladeva	1090–1110
13	Asharaja alias Ashvaraja	1110–1119
14	Ratnapala	1119–1132
15	Rayapala	1132–1145
16	Katukaraja	1145–1148
17	Alhanadeva	1148–1163
18	Kelhanadeva	1163–1193
19	Jayatasimha	1193–1197

=== Jalor ===
	Kings	Reign (CE)
1	Kirti-pala	1160–1182
2	Samara-simha	1182–1204
3	Udaya-simha	1204–1257
4	Chachiga-deva	1257–1282
5	Samanta-simha	1282–1305
6	Kanhada-deva	1292–1311
7	Virama-deva	till 1311

=== Ranastambhapura Branch ===
- Govinda-raja (1192)
- Balhana-deva
- Prahlada-deva
- Viranarayana
- Vagabhata
- Shakti-deva
- Hammiradeva (1283–1311)

=== Raghogarh Branch ===
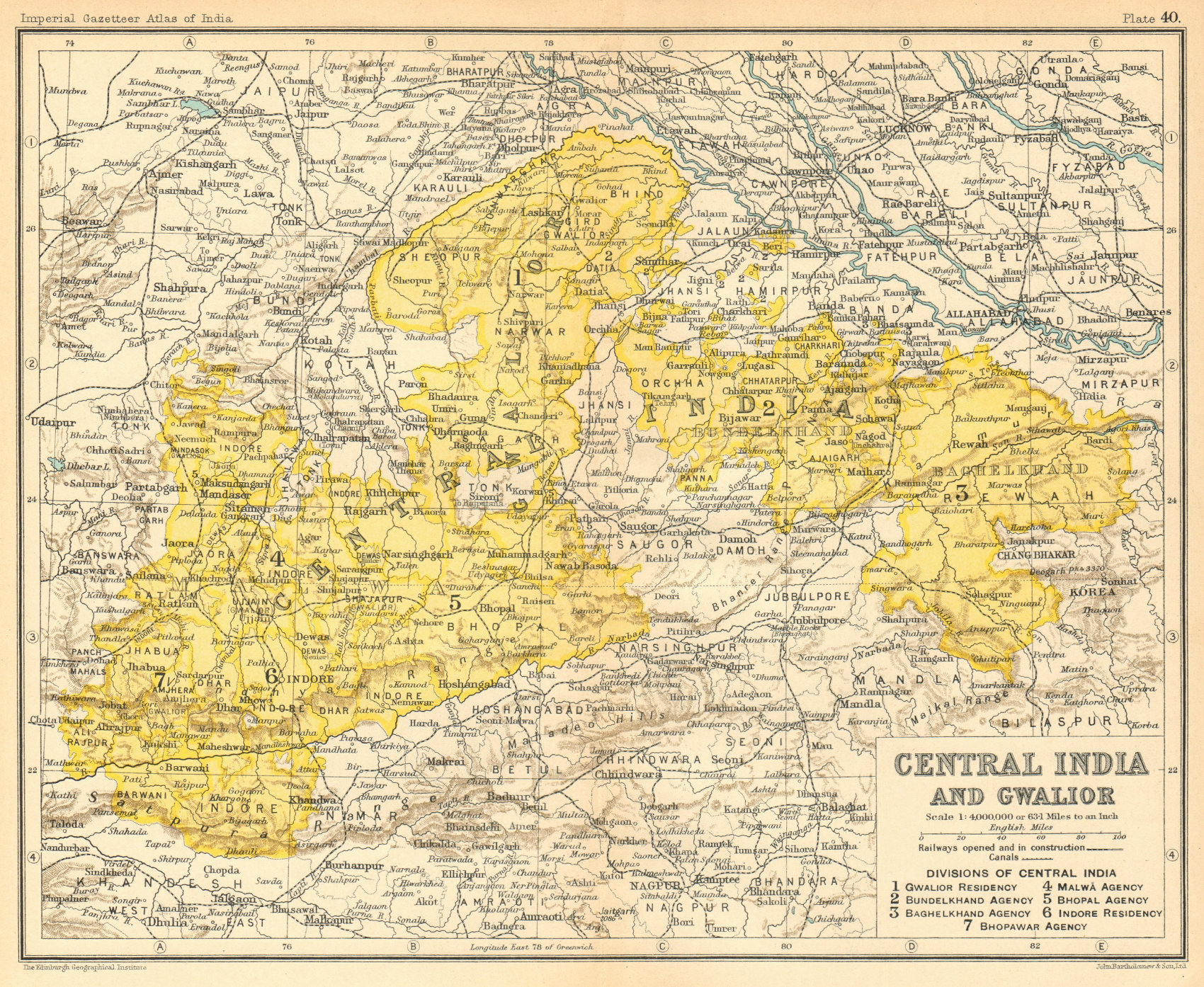
Map of Raghogarh within the Gwalior Residency

Name		Reign began	Reign ended
1	Raja Lal Singh	1673	1697
2	Raja Dhiraj Singh	1697	1726
3	Raja Gaj Singh	1726	1729
4	Raja Vikramaditya I	1730	1744
5	Raja Balabhadra Singh I	1744	1770
6	Raja Balwant Singh	1770	1797
7	Raja Jai Singh	1797	1818
8	Raja Ajit Singh	1818	1856
9	Raja Jai Mandal Singh	1856	1900
10	Raja Vikramjit Singh II	1900	1902
11	Raja Bahadur Singh	1902	1945
12	Raja Balabhadra Singh II	1945	1967
13	Raja Digvijaya Singh	1967	present

=== Sirohi Branch ===
- Rao Alhana
- Rao Kirtipal – founder of Jalore in 1181, and ancestor of the Songara Chauhan clan.
- Rao Samarsinha
- Rao Udaysinha
- Rao Man Singh I (1213–1228)
- Rao Devraj (1228–1250)
- Rao Vijayraj Singh (1250–1311)

Raos of Chandrawati

- Rao Lumba (1311–1321)– founder of Sirohi in 1311
- Rao Tej Singh (1321–1336)
- Rao Kanhar Dev (1336–1343)
- Rao Samant Singh (1343–?)
- Rao Salkha (?–1374)

Raos of Sirohi

- Rao Ranmal (1374–1392)
- Rao Sobhajit (Shivbhan) (1392–1424)
- Rao Sahasmal (Sainsmal) (1424–1451)
- Rao Lakharaj Singh (Lakha) (1451–1483)
- Rao Jagmal I (1483–1523)
- Maharao Akshayraj I (Akheraj) (1523–1533)
- Maharao Rai Singh (1533–1543)
- Maharao Dudaji (Durjan Sal) (1543–1553)
- Maharao Udai Singh I (1553–1562)
- Maharao Man Singh II (1562–1572)
- Maharao Surtan Singh (Surtan Deora)(1572–1610)
- Maharao Rai Singh II (1610–1620)
- Maharao Akheraj II (1620–1673)
- Maharao Udaibhan II (1673–1676)
- Maharao Varisal Singh I (1676–1697)
- Maharao Surtan Singh II (1697) (deposed)
- Maharao Chattarsal Singh (Durjan Singh) (1697–1705)
- Maharao Umaid Singh (Maan Singh III) (1705–1749)
- Maharao Prithviraj Singh (1749–1772)
- Maharao Takhat Singh (1772–1781)
- Maharao Jagat Singh (1781–1782)
- Maharao Bairisal II (Varisal) (1782–1809)
- Maharao Udaibhan Singh (1809–1817)
- Maharao Sheo Singh (1817–1846)
- Maharao Umaid Singh II Bahadur (1862–1875)
- HH Maharao Kesari Singh Bahadur (1875–1920)
- HH Maharao Sarup Ram Singh Bahadur (1920–1946)
- HH Maharao Tej Ram Singh Bahadur (1946–1947)
- Maharani Krishna (Kunverba) (1946–1947)
- Maharao Raghubir Singh Bahadur (1947–1950)
- Maharao Abhai Singh Bahadur (1950–1998)
- 1998 – Present: Maharao Raghubir Singhji Deora (b. 1988)

=== Bundi Branch ===
- 1554 - 1585 Surjan Singh
- 1585 - 1608 Bhoj Singh
- 1608 - 1632 Ratan Singh
- 1632 - 1658 Chattar Sal Singh
- 1658 - 1682 Bhao Singh
- 1682 - 1696 Anirudh Singh
- 1696 - 1730 Budh Singh (b. 16.. - d. 1739)
- 1730 - 1749 Dalel Singh
- 1749 - 1770 Umaid Singh (1st time) (b. 1729 - d. 1804)
- 1770 - 1773 Ajit Singh (d. 1773)
- 1773 - 1804 Umaid Singh (2nd time) (s.a.)
- 1804 - 14 May 1821 Bishen Singh (b. 1773 - d. 1821)
- 14 May 1821 - 28 Mar 1889 Ram Singh (b. 1811 - d. 1889) (from 1 Jan 1877, Sir Ram Singh)
- 28 Mar 1889 - 26 Jul 1927 Raghubir Singh (b. 1869 - d. 1927)

(from 1 Jan 1894, Sir Raghubir Singh)

- 26 Jul 1927 - 23 Apr 1945 Ishwari Singh (b. 1893 - d. 1945) (from 11 May 1937, Sir Ishwari Singh)
- 23 Apr 1945 - 15 Aug 1947 Bahadur Singh (b. 1920 - d. 1977)
- 1947 – 1977 Bahadur Singh
- 1977 - 2010 Ranjit Singh
- 2021 - till date Brigadier Bhupesh Singh , SC, VSM

=== Kota Branch ===
- 1607-1624 Rao Hriday Narayan singh ( Provincial Head)
- 1631 – 27 January 1648: Rao Madho Singh
- 1648 – 26 April 1658: Rao Mukund Singh
- 1658 – 23 August 1682: Rao Jagat Singh
- 1682 – February 1683: Rao Prem Singh
- 1683 – April 1696: Rao Kishor Singh I
- 1696-1697 Rao Bishin Singh
- Apr 1697– 18 June 1707: Rao Ram Singh I: (b. 16.. – d. 1707)
- 18 June 1707 – 19 June 1720: Maharao Bhim Singh I: (b. 1682 – d. 1720)
- 19 Jun 1720 – Oct 1723: Rao Arjun Singh: (d. 1723)
- Oct 1723 – 1 August 1756: Maharao Durjan Sal: (d. 1756)
- 1756 – March 1757: Maharao Ajit Singh: (b. bf. 1676 – d. 1757)
- March 1757 – 17 December 1764: Maharao Shatru/Chatar Sal Singh I: (b. bf.1718 – d. 1764)
- 17 December 1764 – 17 January 1771: Maharao Guman Singh: (b. 1724 – d. 1771)
- 17 January 1771 – 19 November 1819: Maharao Umaid Singh I: (b. 1761 – d. 1819)
- 19 November 1819 – 20 July 1828: Maharao Kishor Singh II: (b. c. 1781 – d. 1828)
- 20 July 1828 – 27 March 1866: Maharao Ram Singh II: (b. 1808 – d. 1866)
- 27 Mar 1866 – 11 June 1889: HH Maharao Raja Shatru Sal II : (b. 1837 – d. 1889)
- 11 Jun 1889 – 27 December 1940: HH Maharao Raja Umed Singh II: (b. 1873 – d. 1940) (from 23 May 1900, Sir Umed Singh II)
- 11 June 1889 – 5 December 1896: .... – Regent
- 27 December 1940 – 18 April 1948: HH Maharao Raja Sir Bhim Singh II: (b. 1909 – d. 1991)
- 18 April 1948 – 21 June 1991: Maharao Raja Bhim Singh II: (b. 1909 – d. 1991); last ruling Maharao.
- 21 June 1991 – 29 January 2022: Maharao Raja Brijraj Singh
- 29 January 2022 – Present : Maharao Raja Ijyaraj Singh

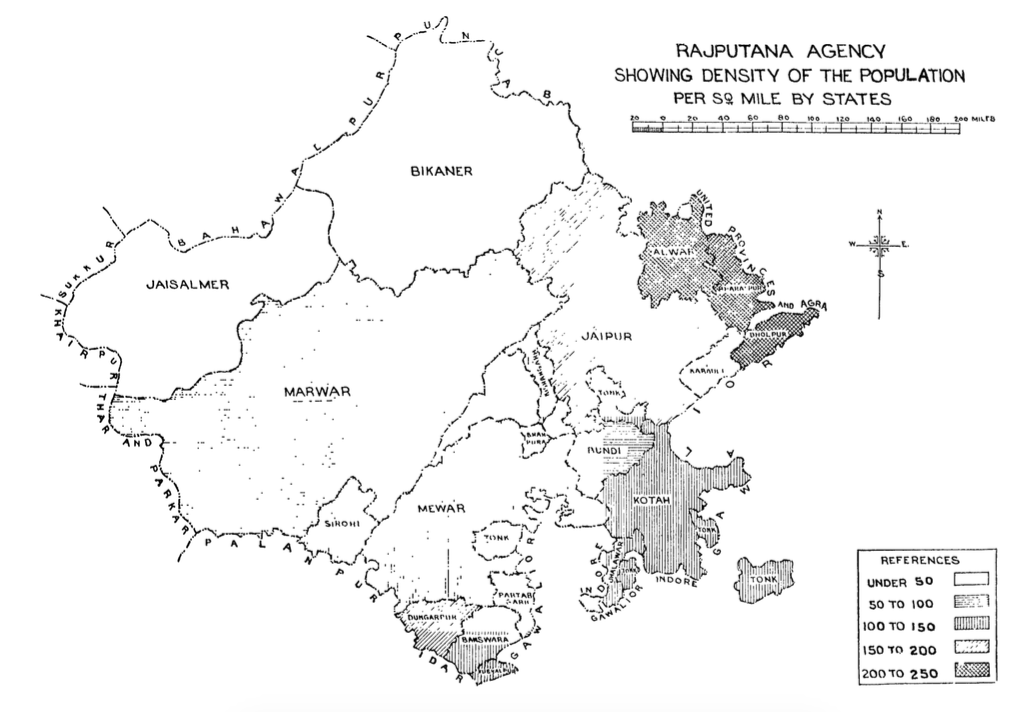
Map of the Rajputana Agency

=== Tulsipur State ===
- Raja Meghraj Singh Chauhan, born 1325
- Raja Udat Singh Chauhan, born 1485
- Raja Dev Narayan Singh Chauhan, born 1575
- Raja Ram Krishna Singh Chauhan, born 1675
- .Raja Nawal Singh Chauhan, born 1730
- Raja Dalel Singh Chauhan, born 1750
- Raja Dan Bahadur Singh Chauhan, born 1775
- Raja Drigraj Singh Chauhan, born 1795
- Raja Drig Singh Chauhan, 1857 to 1859
- Rajkumar Tirtha Ram Singh, born 1842
- Sardar Saheb Har Dayal Singh, born 1862
- Sardar Saheb Jwala Singh born 1882
- Mir Saheb Dilip Singh, born 1905
- Babusaheb Prachanda Singh Thakuri born 1933
- Rajpal Jwala Pratap Singh, born 1964

=== Pratapgarh Branch ===
- Babu Pratap Singh (1628–1682)
- Babu Jai Singh (1682–1728)
- Babu Chhataradari Singh
- Babu Prithvipat Singh
- Babu Duniapat Singh
- Raja Bahadur Singh
- Raja Abhiman Singh
- Raja Gulab Singh
- Raja Ajit Singh (1857–1889)
- Raja Pratap Bahadur Singh (1889–1921)
- Raja Ajit Pratap Singh (1921–2000)
- Raja Abhay Pratap Singh (2000–2013)
- Raja Anil Pratap Singh (2013–Present)

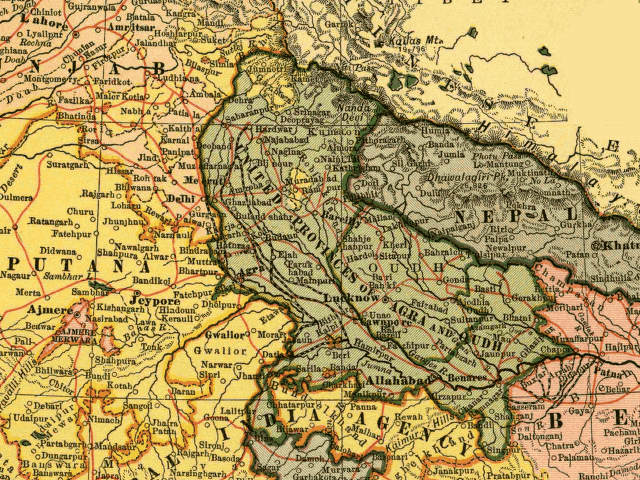
United Provinces of Agra and Oudh

=== Vav Branch ===
Palanpur Agency

- Rao Rajeshwar Rana Saheb Jalam Singhji
- Rao Rajeshwar Rana Saheb Vida Singhji
- Rao Rajeshwar Rana Saheb Adhar Singhji
- Rao Rajeshwar Rana Saheb Deravar Singhji
- Rao Rajeshwar Rana Saheb Chandan Singhji Rao Rajeshwar
- Rao Rajeshwar Rana Saheb Deravar Singhji
- Rao Rajeshwar Rana Saheb Hari Singhji
- Rao Rajeshwar Rana Saheb Takhat Singhji
- Rao Rajeshwar Rana Saheb Rajendra Singhji
- Rao Rajeshwar Rana Saheb Gajendra Singhji

=== Dhami Branch ===
Princely states in Himachal Pradesh, Dhami in dark brown

- 1815 – 1868 Govardhan Singh (b. c.1802 – d. 1868)
- 1868 – 1894 Fateh Singh (b. 1855 – d. 1894)
- 1894 – Jan 1920 Hira Singh (b. 1878 – d. 1920)
- Jan 1920 – 15 Aug 1947 Dhalip Singh (b. 1908 – d. 1987)

=== Sambalpur Branch ===
- Balarama Deva (1570 - 1595 )
- Hrdayanarayana Deva (1595 - 1605)
- Balabhadra Deva (1605 - 1630)
- Madhukar Deva (1630-1660)
- Baliar Deva (1650-1688)
- Ratan Singh (1688 - 1690)
- Chhatra Sai (1690 - 1725)
- Ajit Singh (1725 - 1766)
- Abhaya Singh (1766-1778)
- Balabhadra Singh (1778 - 1781)
- Jayanta Singh (1781 - 1818)
- Maharaj Sai (1820 - 1827)
- Rani Mohan Kumari (f) (1827 - 1833)
- Narayan Singh (1833 - 1849)
- Rani Mukhyapan Devi (f) (1849 - 1849)
- Surendra Sai (in rebellion) (1809 - 1884)

=== Patna Branch ===
- Ramai Deva (1360–1380)
- Mahalinga Deva (1380–1385)
- Vatsaraja Deva (1385–1410)
- Vaijala Deva I (1410–1430)
- Bhojaraj Deva (1430–1455)
- Pratap Rudra Deva I (1455–1480)
- Bhupal Deva I (1480–1500)
- Vikramaditya Deva I (1500–1520)
- Vaijal Deva II (1520–1540)
- Bajra Hiradhara Deva (1540–1570)
- Narsingh Deva (1570–1577)
- Hamir Deva (1577–1581)
- Pratap Deva II (1581–1620)
- Vikramaditya Deva II (1620–1640)
- Mukunda Deva (1640–1670)
- Balaram Deva (1670–1678)
- Hrdesha Deva (1678–1685)
- Rai Singh Deva (1685–1762)
- Prithviraj Deva (1762–1765)
- Ramchandra Singh Deo I (1765–1820)
- Bhupal Singh Deo (1820–1848)
- Hiravajra Singh Deo (1848–1866)
- Pratap Singh Deo (1866–25 November 1878)
- Ramchandra Singh Deo II (25 November 1878-1895)
- Lal Dalganjan Singh Deo (1895–1910)
- Prithviraj Singh (1910–1924)
- Rajendra Narayan Singh Deo (1924–1 January 1948)
- Rajendra Narayan Singh Deo (1 January 1948 – 23 February 1975)
- Rajraj Singh Deo (23 February 1975 – April 2004)
- Kanak Vardhan Singh Deo (April 2004 – present)

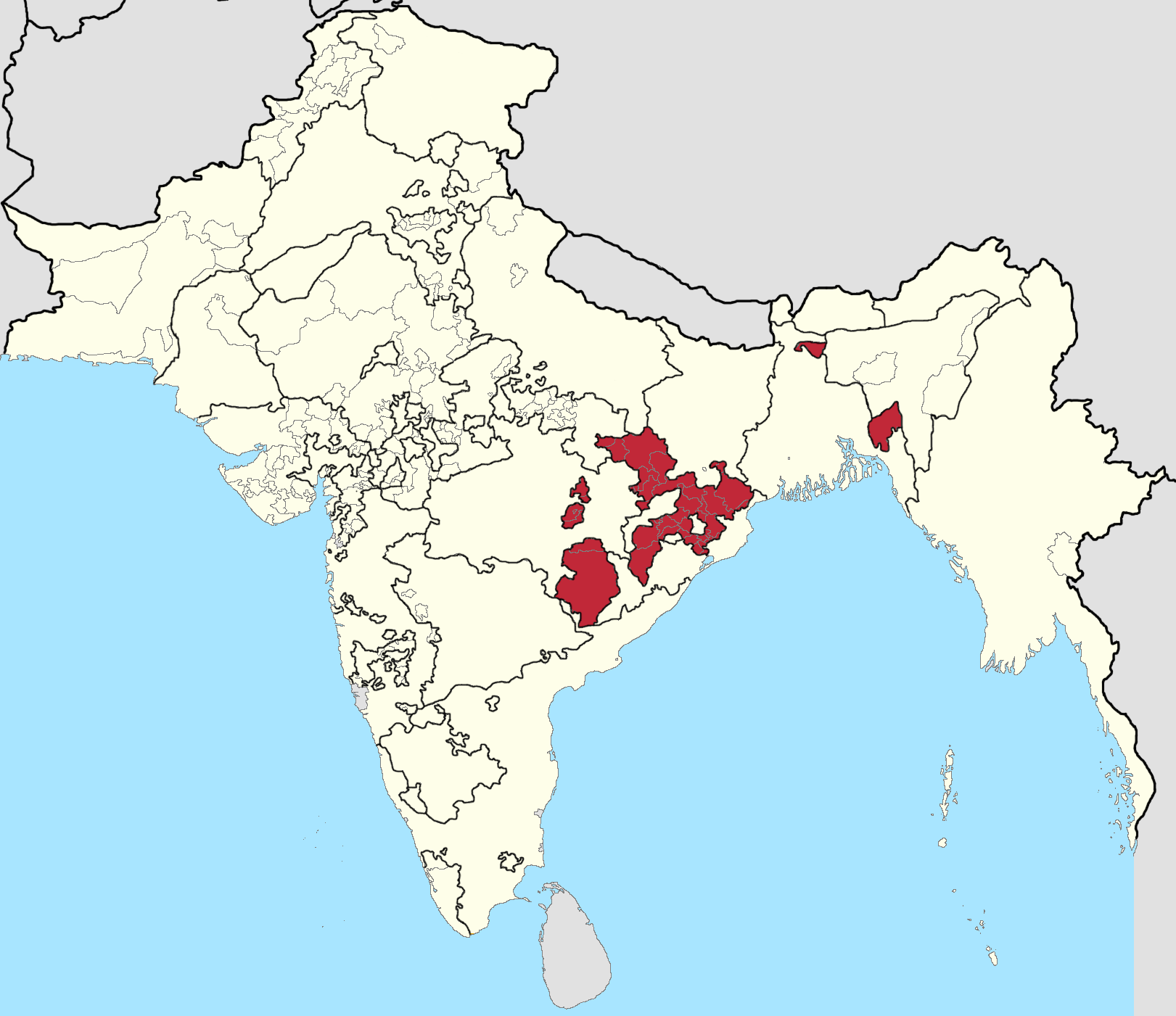
Eastern States Agency

=== Sonepur Branch ===
Name	Date of birth	Reign began	Reign ended	Date of death
Madan Gopal Singh Deo		1650	1680	
Lal Sai Singh Deo		1680	1689	
Purusottam Singh Deo		1689	1709	
Raj Singh Deo		1709	1729	
Achal Singh Deo		1729	1749	
Divya Singh Deo		1749	1766	
Jarawar Singh Deo		1766	1767	
Sobha Singh Deo		1767	1781	
Prithvi Singh Deo		1781	1841	
Niladhar Singh Deo	1838	27 July 1841	9 September 1891	
Pratap Rudra Singh Deo	22 July 1853	9 September 1891	8 August 1902	
Bir Mitrodaya Singh Deo	8 July 1874	8 August 1902	29 April 1937	
Sudhansu Shekhar Singh Deo	23 August 1899	29 April 1937	10 August 1963	
Bir Pratap Singh Deo	31 July 1923	10 August 1963	28 December 1971 (deposed)	24 November 1972
Prithvi Bir Singh Deo		24 November 1972		

=== Changbhakar Branch ===
- 1819 - 18.. Man Singh Deo
- 1848 - 1865 Janjit Singh Deo
- 1 Dec 1865 - 1897 Balabhadra Singh Deo (b. c.1825 - d. ... )
- 1897 - 1932 Mahabir Singh Deo (b. 1879 - d. 1932)
- 1932 - 1947 Krishna Pratap Singh Deo
- 1932 - 1946 ... -Regent

=== Korea Branch ===
- .... - .... Jit Rai Deo
- .... - .... Sagar Sahi Deo
- .... - .... Afhar Sahi Deo
- .... - .... Jahan Sahi Deo
- .... - .... Sawal Sahi Deo
- .... - .... Gajraj Singh Deo
- 1795 - Jun 1828 Gharib Singh Deo (b. 1745 - d. 1828)
- Jun 1828 - 1864 Amole Singh Deo (b. 1785 - d. 1864)
- 4 Apr 1864 - 1897 Pran Singh Deo (b. 1857/59 - d. 1897)
- 1897 - 18 Nov 1909 Sheo Mangal Singh Deo (b. 1874 - d. 1909)
- 18 Nov 1909 – 15 Aug 1947 Ramanuj Pratap Singh Deo (b. 1901 - d. 1954)

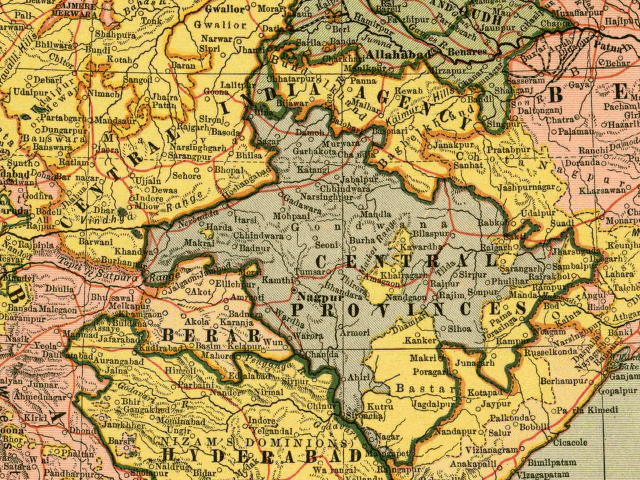
Central Provinces

== Family Tree ==
Chahamanas of Naddula

Lakshmana^{(1)} r. c. 950-982
Shobhita^{(2)} r. c. 982-986	Vigrahapala^{(4)} r. c. 990-994
Baliraja^{(3)} r. c. 986-990	Mahindu^{(5)} r. c. 994-1015
Ashvapala^{(6)} r. c. 1015-1019	Anahilla^{(8)} r. c. 1024-1055
Ahila^{(7)} r. c. 1019-1024	Balaprasada^{(9)} r. c. 1055-1070	Jendraraja^{(10)} r. c. 1070-1080
Prithvipala^{(11)} r. c. 1080-1090	Jojalladeva^{(12)} r. c. 1090-1110	Asharaja^{(13)} r. c. 1110-1119
Ratnapala^{(14)} r. c. 1119-1132	Katukaraja^{(16)} r. c. 1145-1148	Alhanadeva^{(17)} r. c. 1148-1163
Rayapala^{(15)} r. c. 1132-1145	Kelhanadeva^{(18)} r. c. 1163-1193
Jayatasimha^{(19)} r. c. 1193-1197

Chahamanas of Jalor

Kirtipala^{(1)} r. c. 1160-1182
Samarasimha^{(2)} r. c. 1182-1204
Udayasimha^{(3)} r. c. 1204-1257
Chachigadeva^{(4)} r. c. 1257-1282
Samantasimha^{(5)} r. c. 1282-1305
Kanhadadeva^{(6)} r. c. 1291-1311
Viramadeva^{(7)} r. c. 1311

== Coinage ==
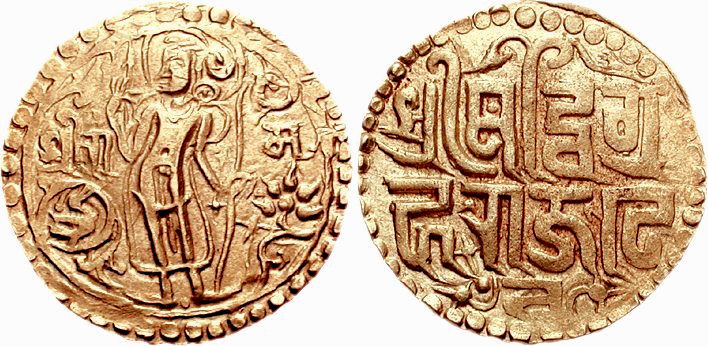
Coin of Vigraha Raja IV (1150-1164)

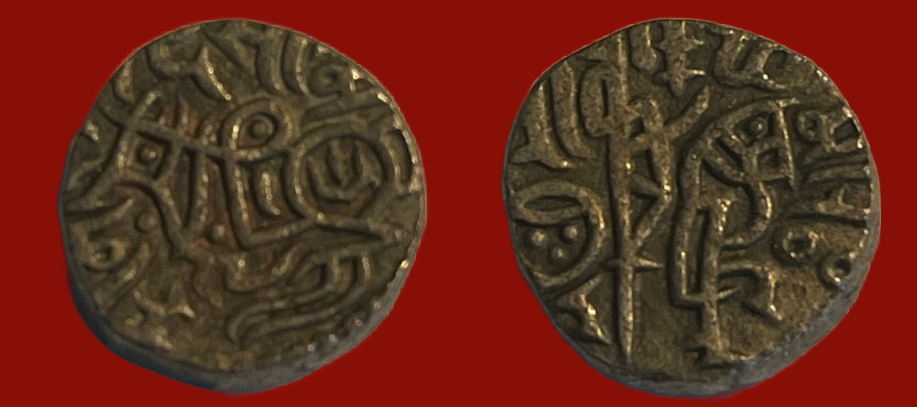
Coin of Somesvara Deva (1167-1179),

Coin of Pritviraj III (1179-1192)

== Gallery ==
=== Bundi ===
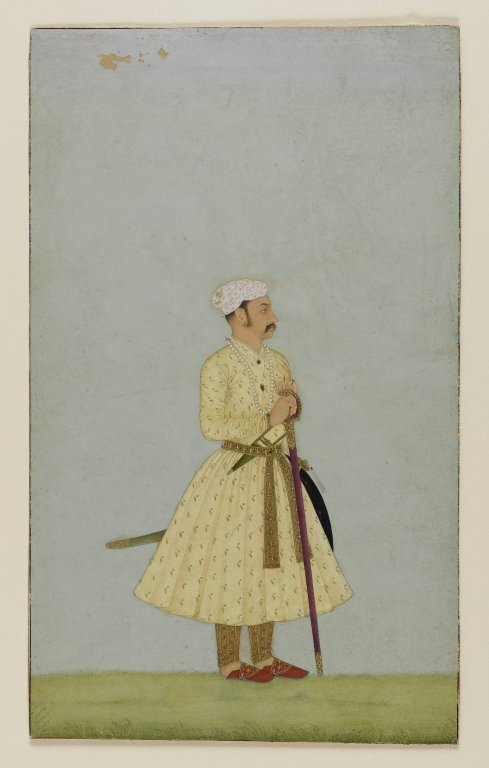
Chattar Sal Singh

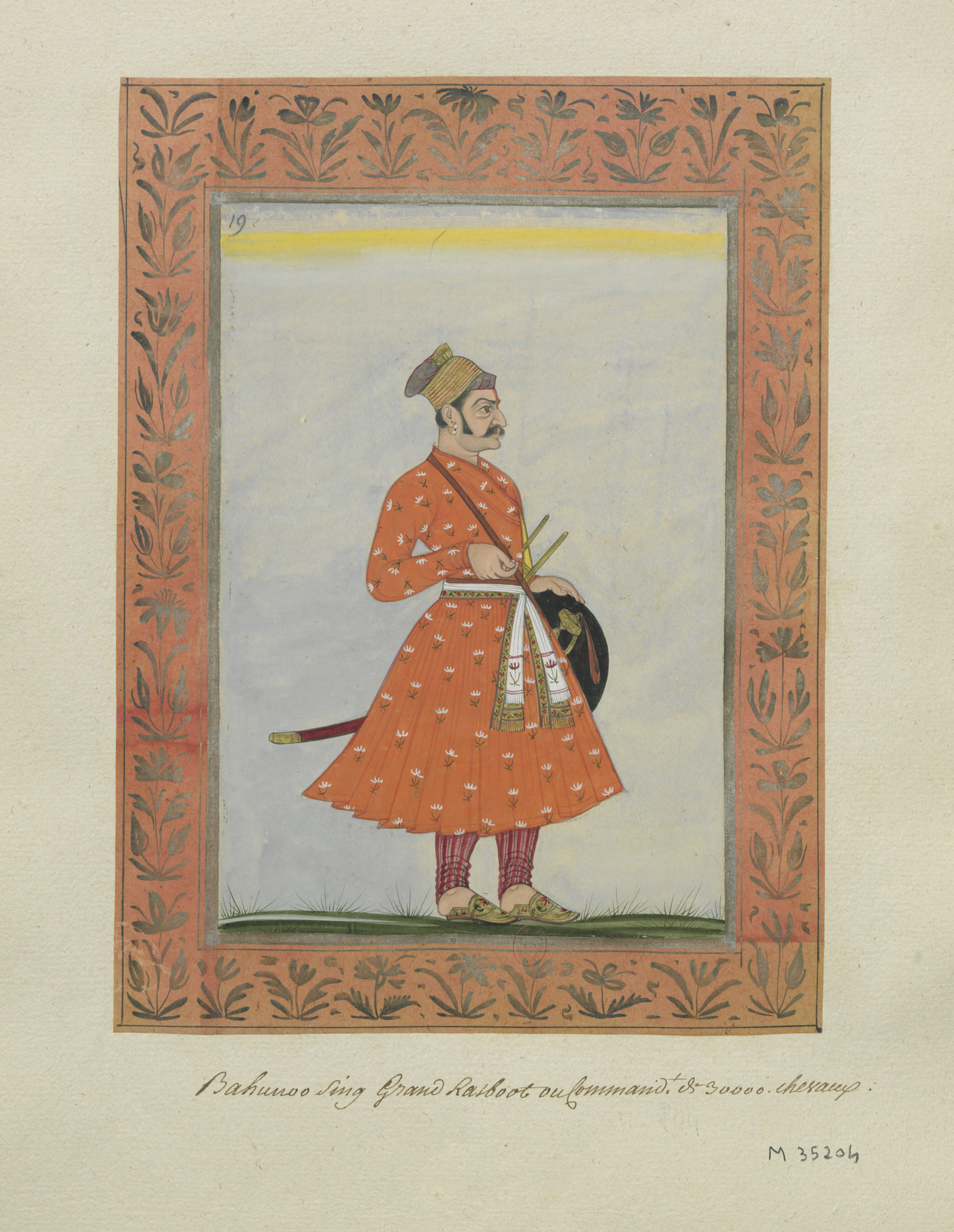
Bhao Singh

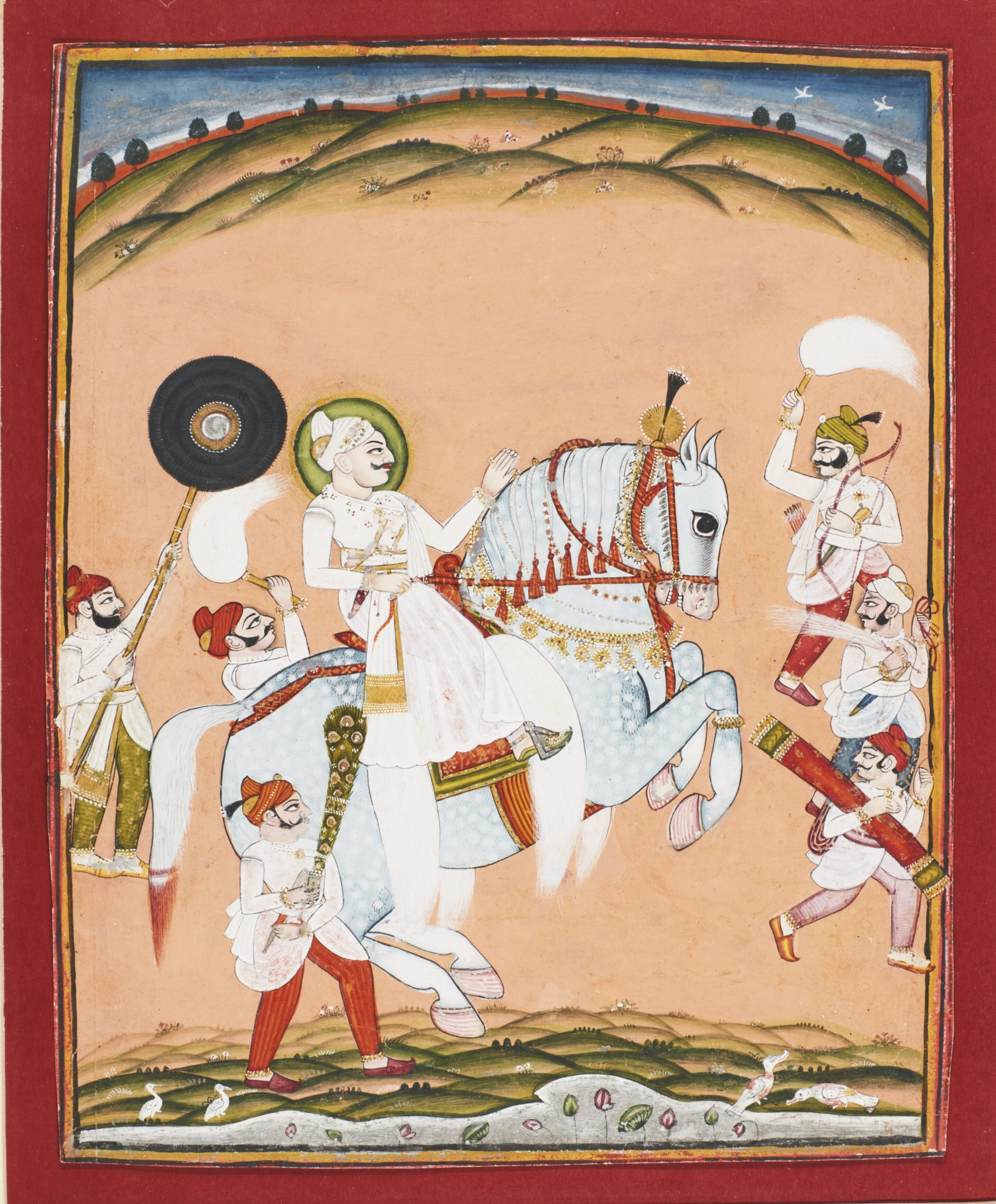
Ajit Singh

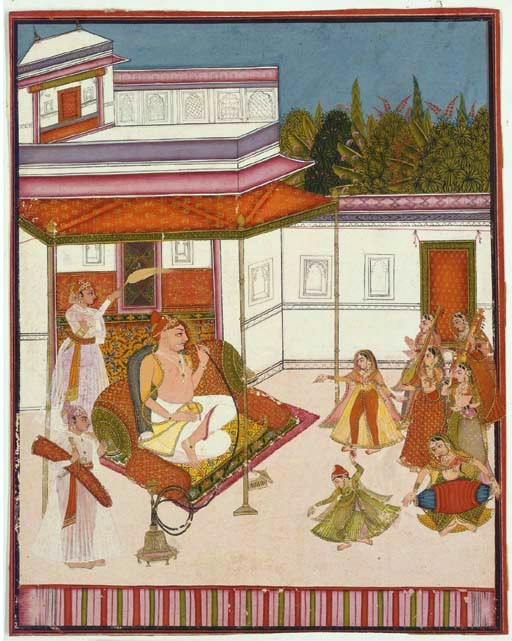
Umed Singh

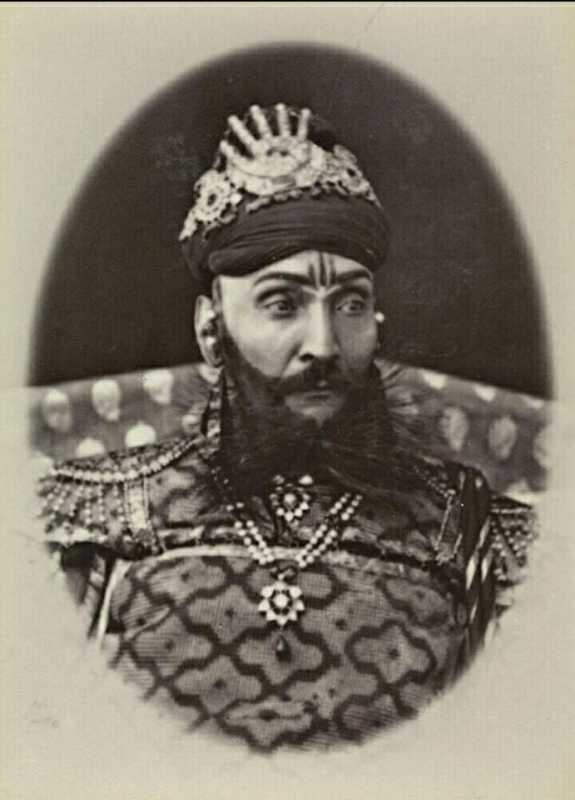
Ram Singh

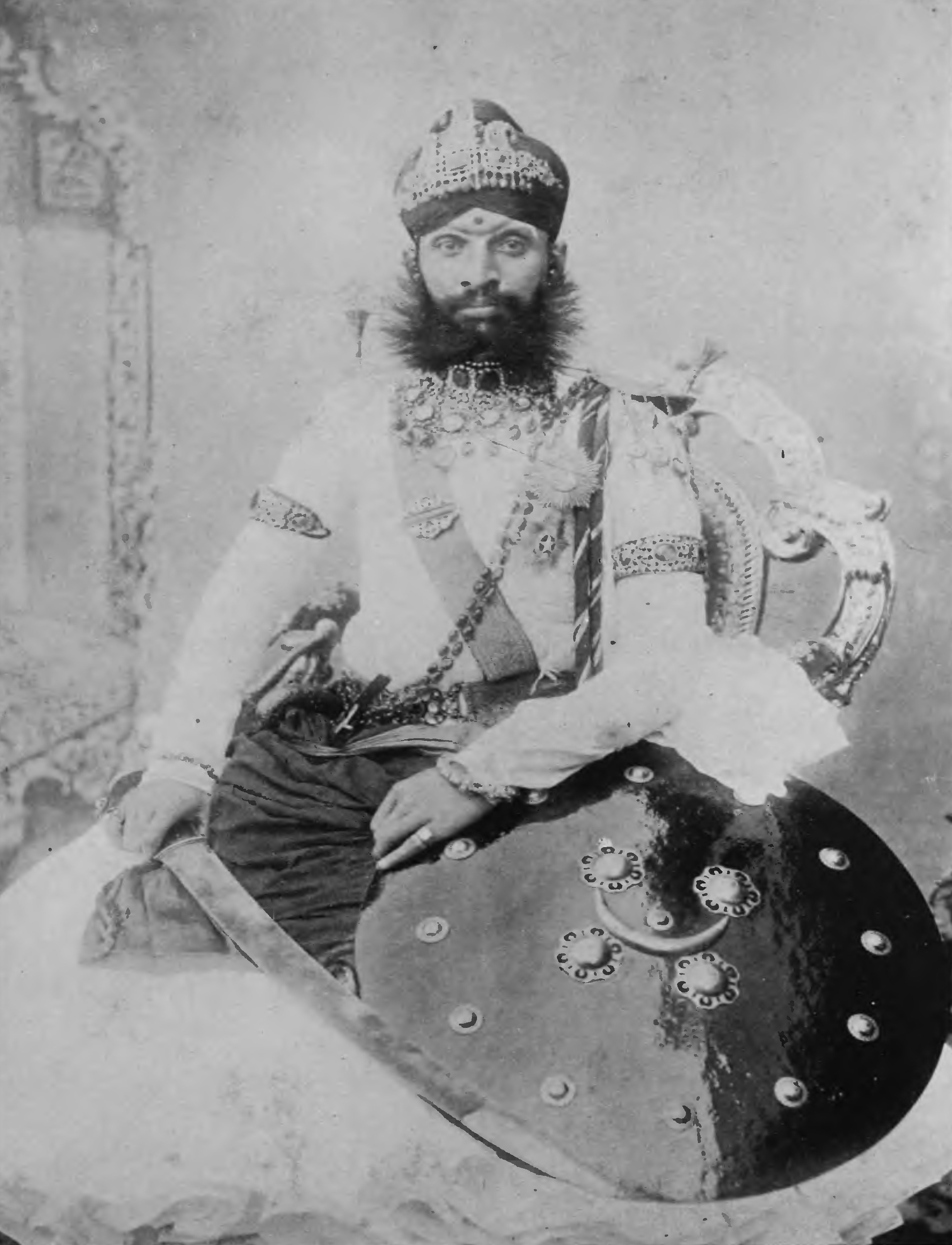
Raghubir Singh

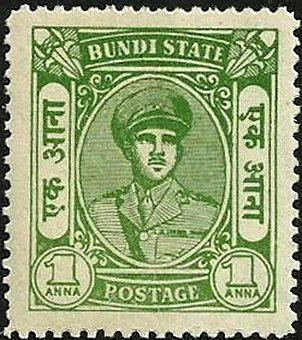
Bahadur Singh

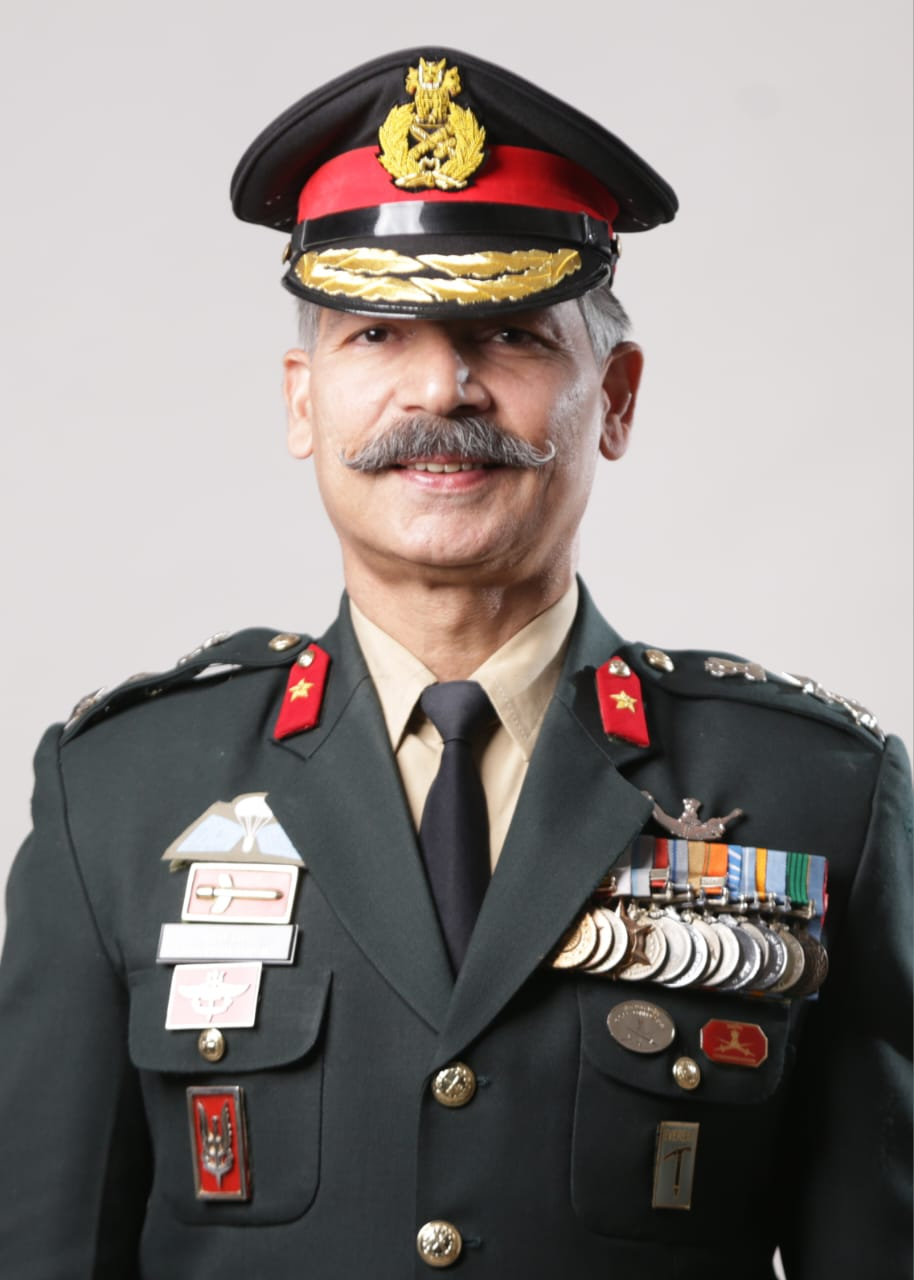
Bhupesh Singh

=== Kotah ===
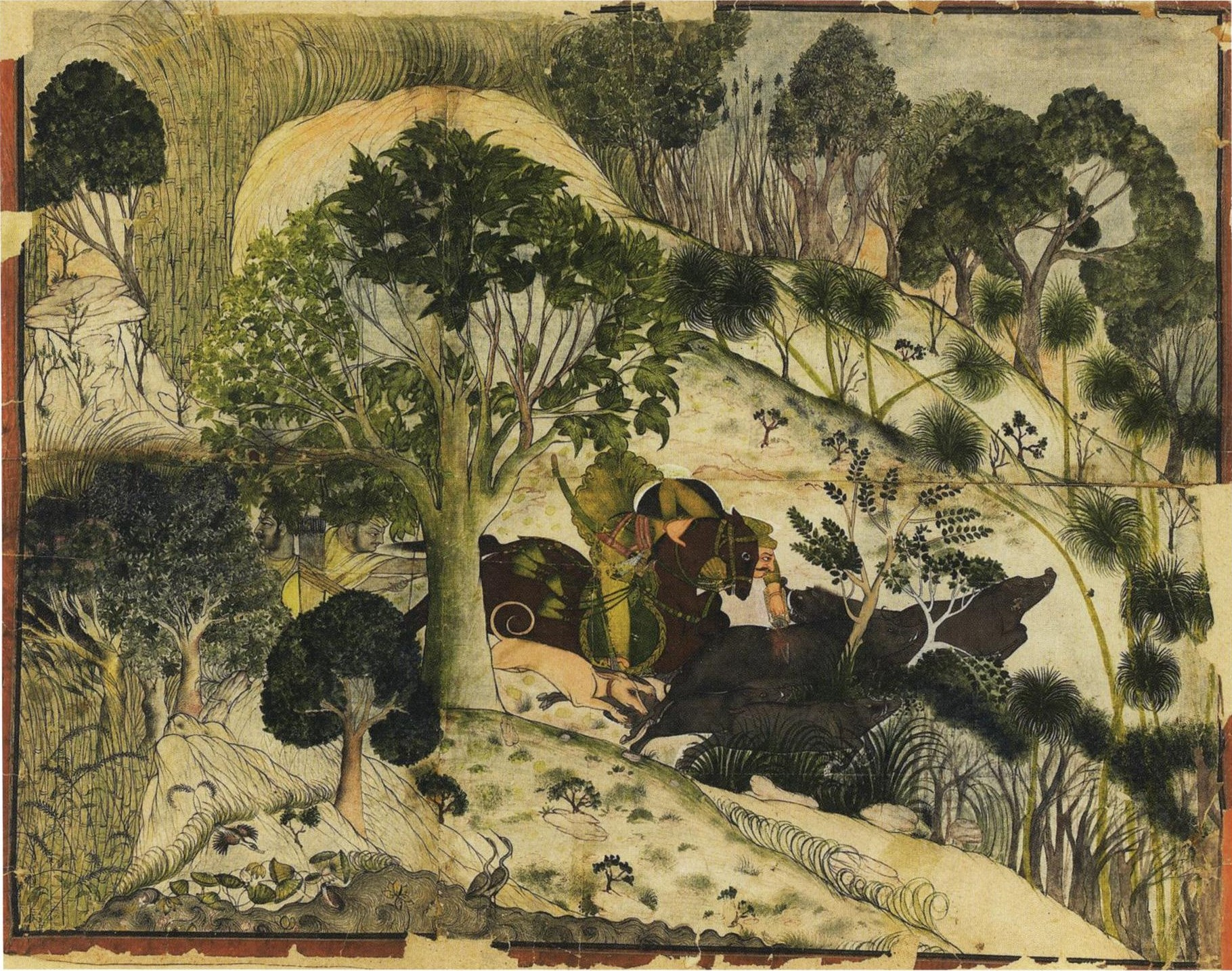
Madho Singh

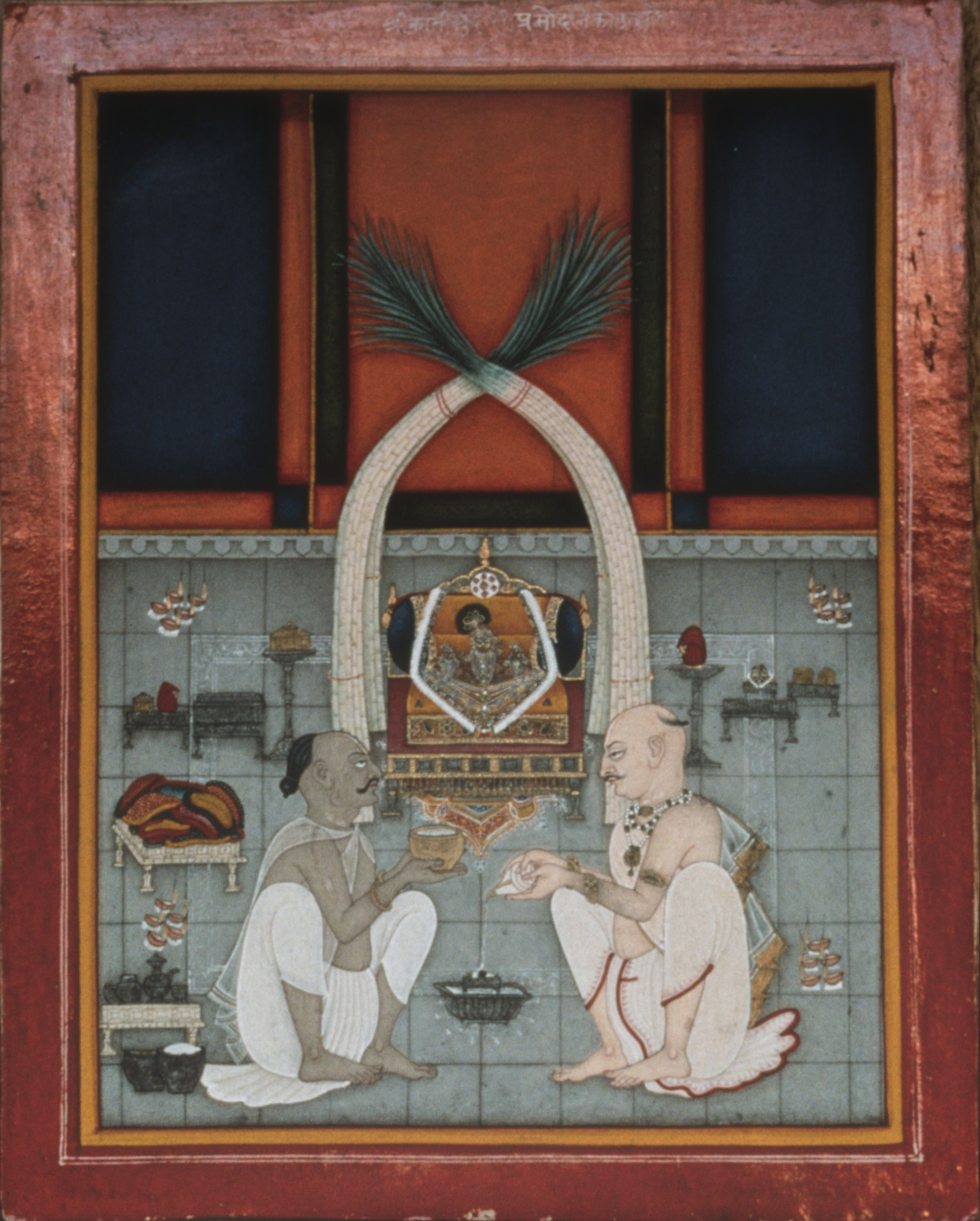
Kishor Singh

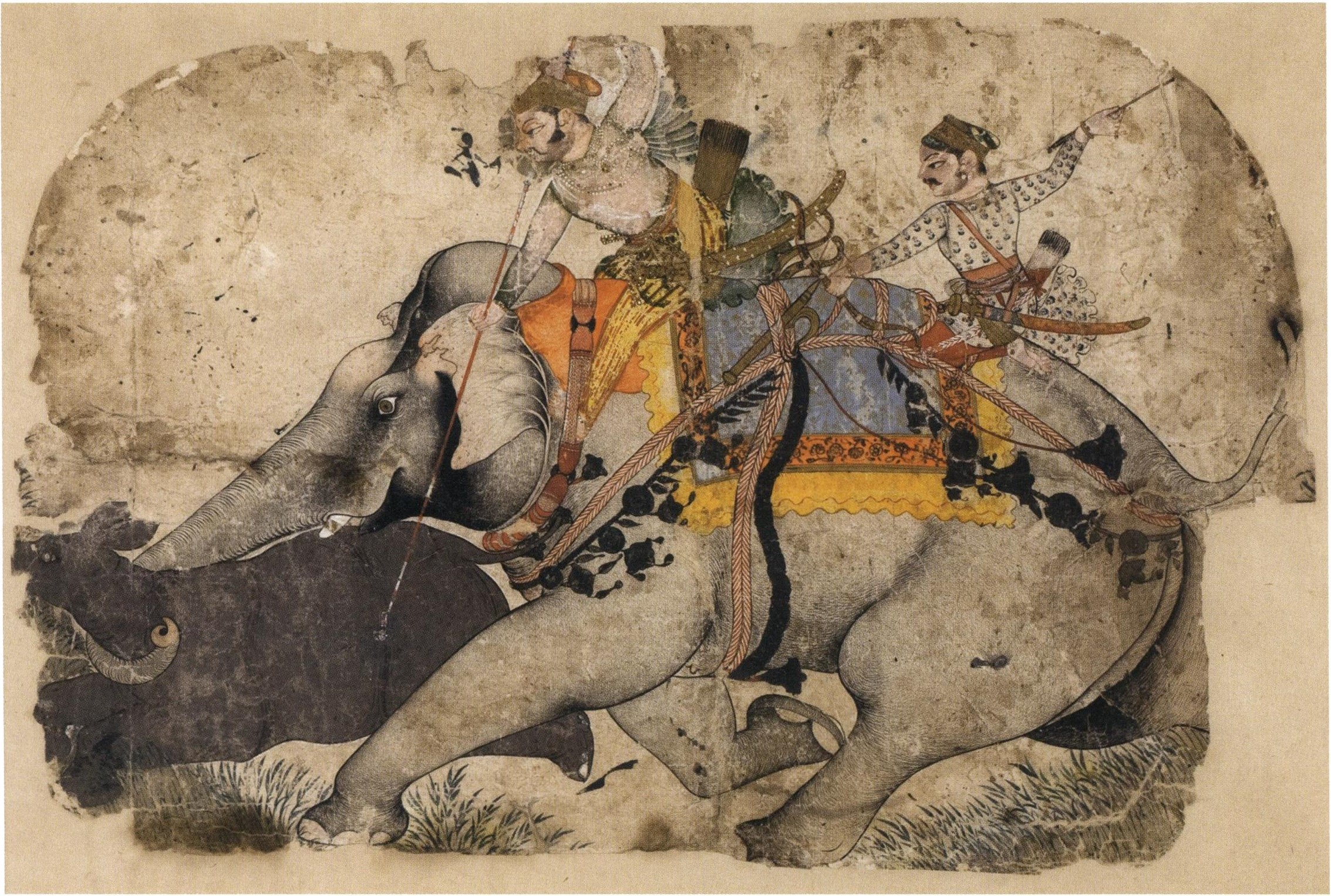
Ram Singh I

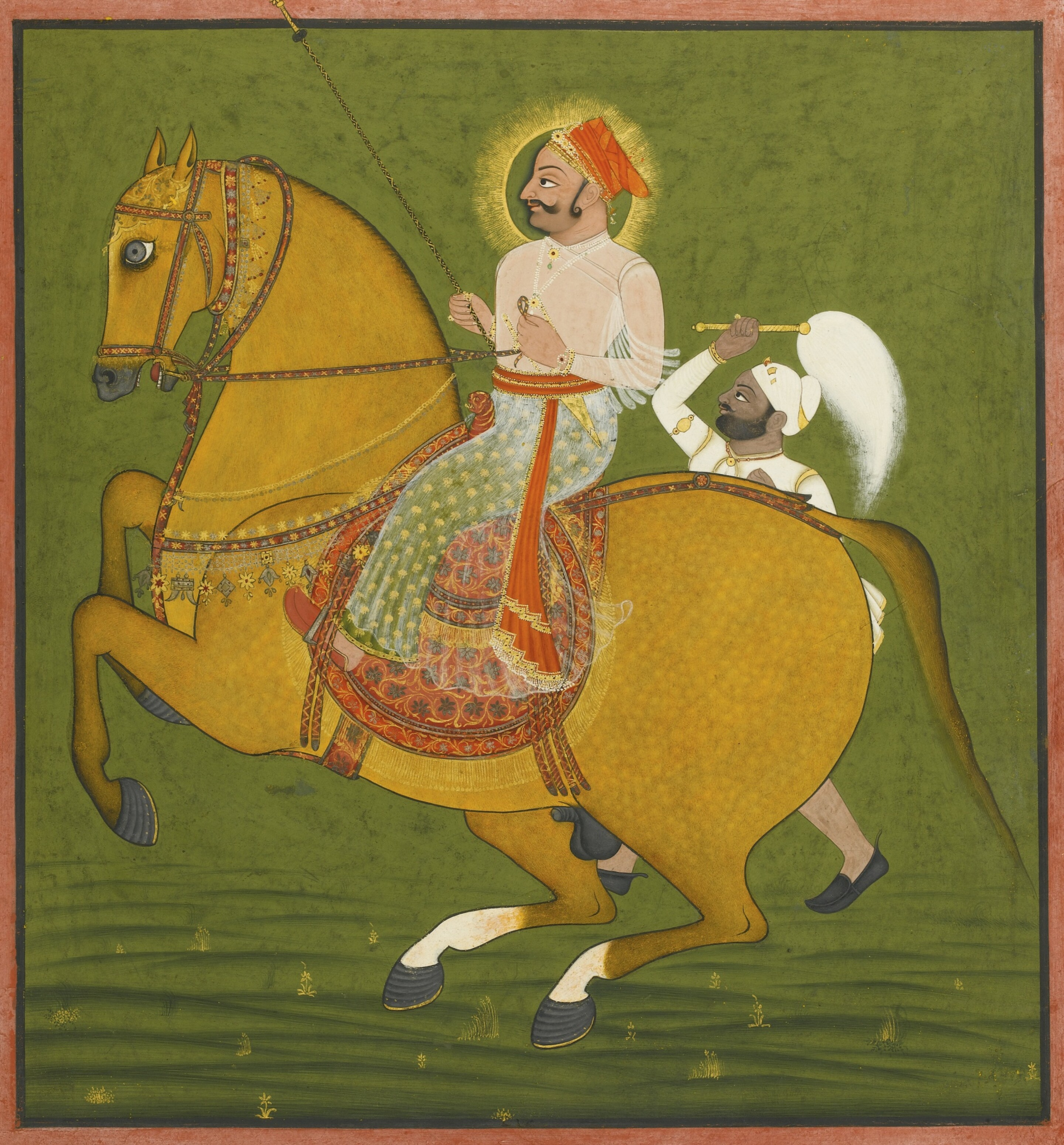
Umed Singh I

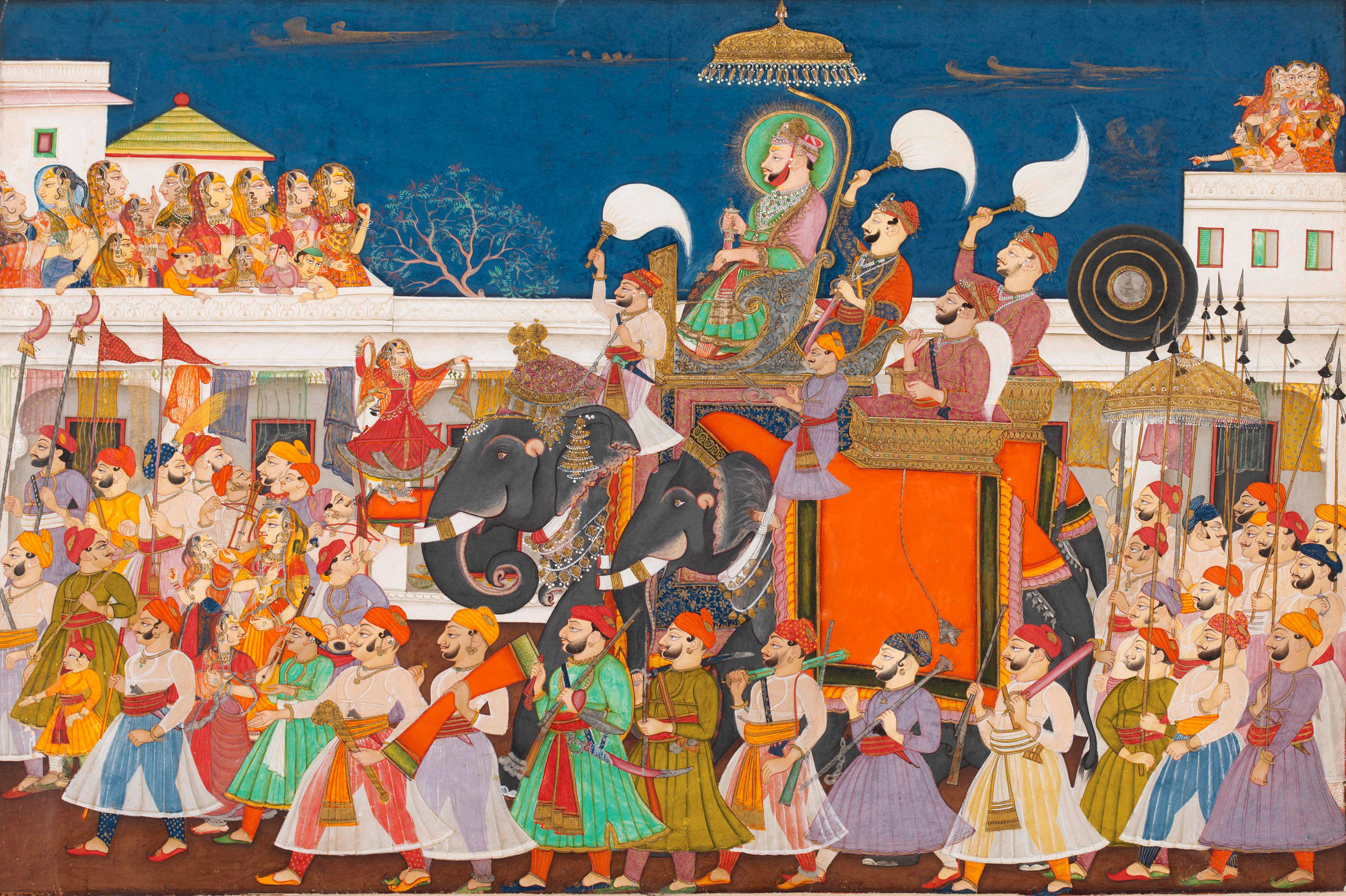
Ram Singh II

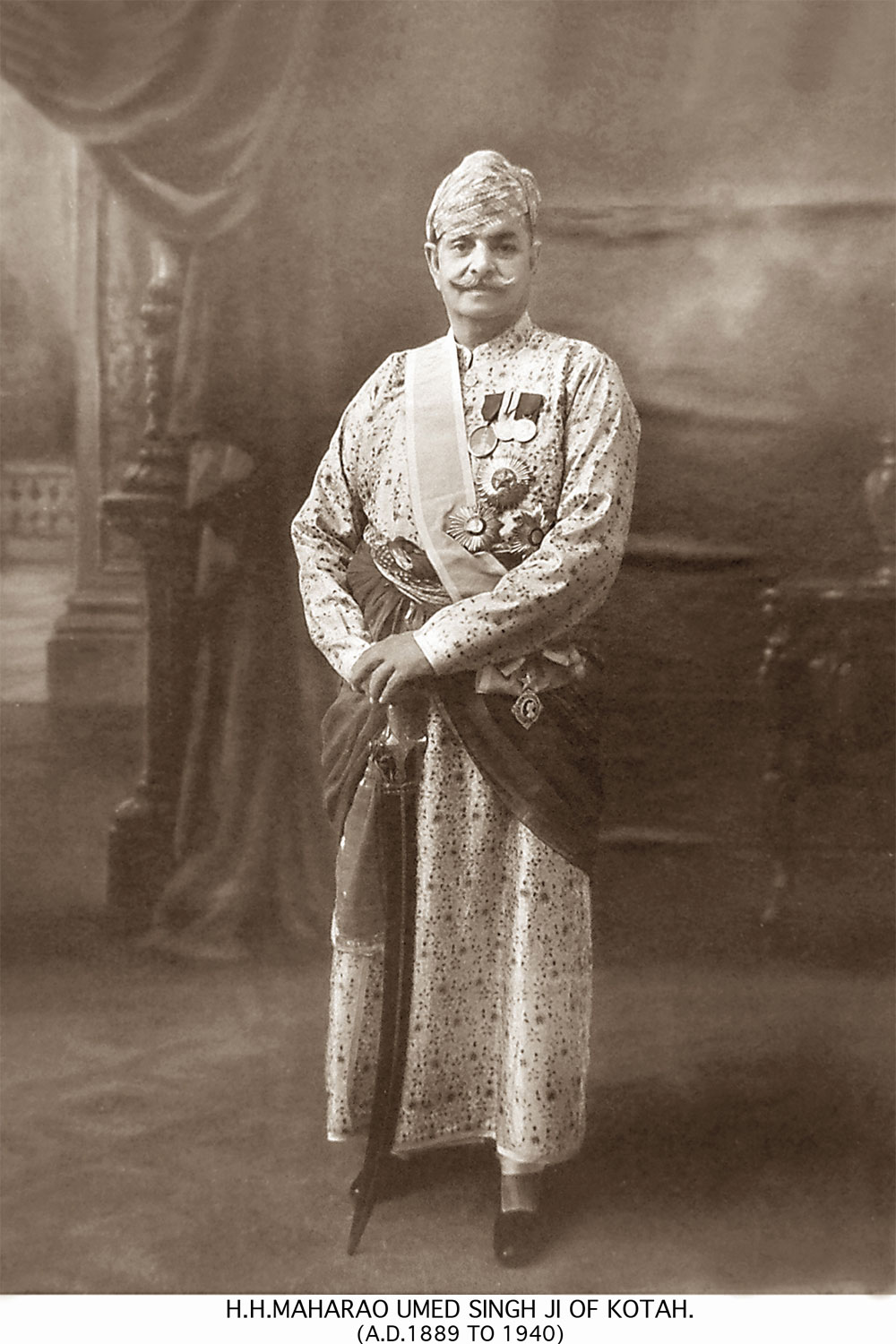
Umed Singh II

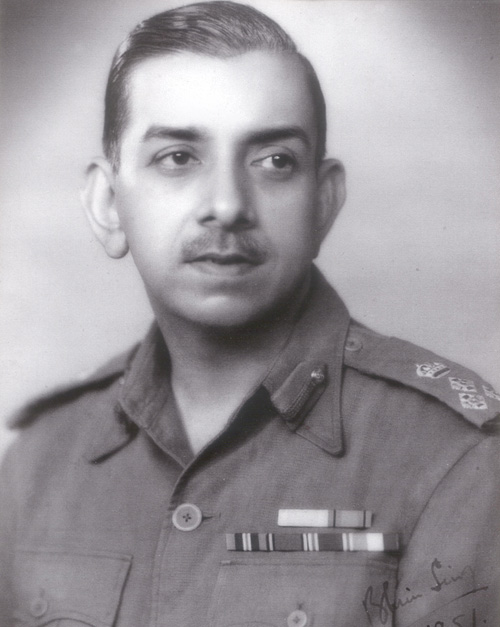
Bhim Singh II

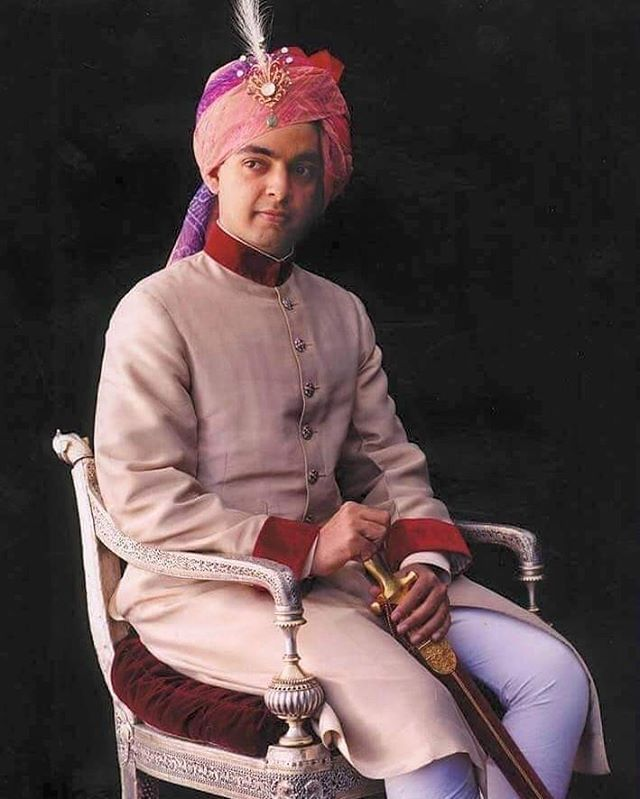
Ijyaraj Singh

=== Raghogarh ===
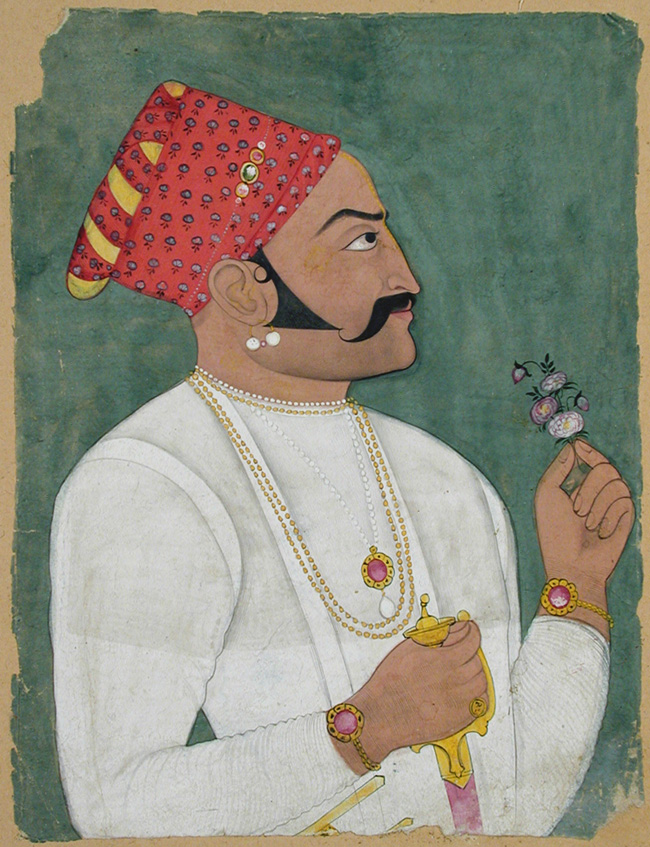
Dhiraj Singh

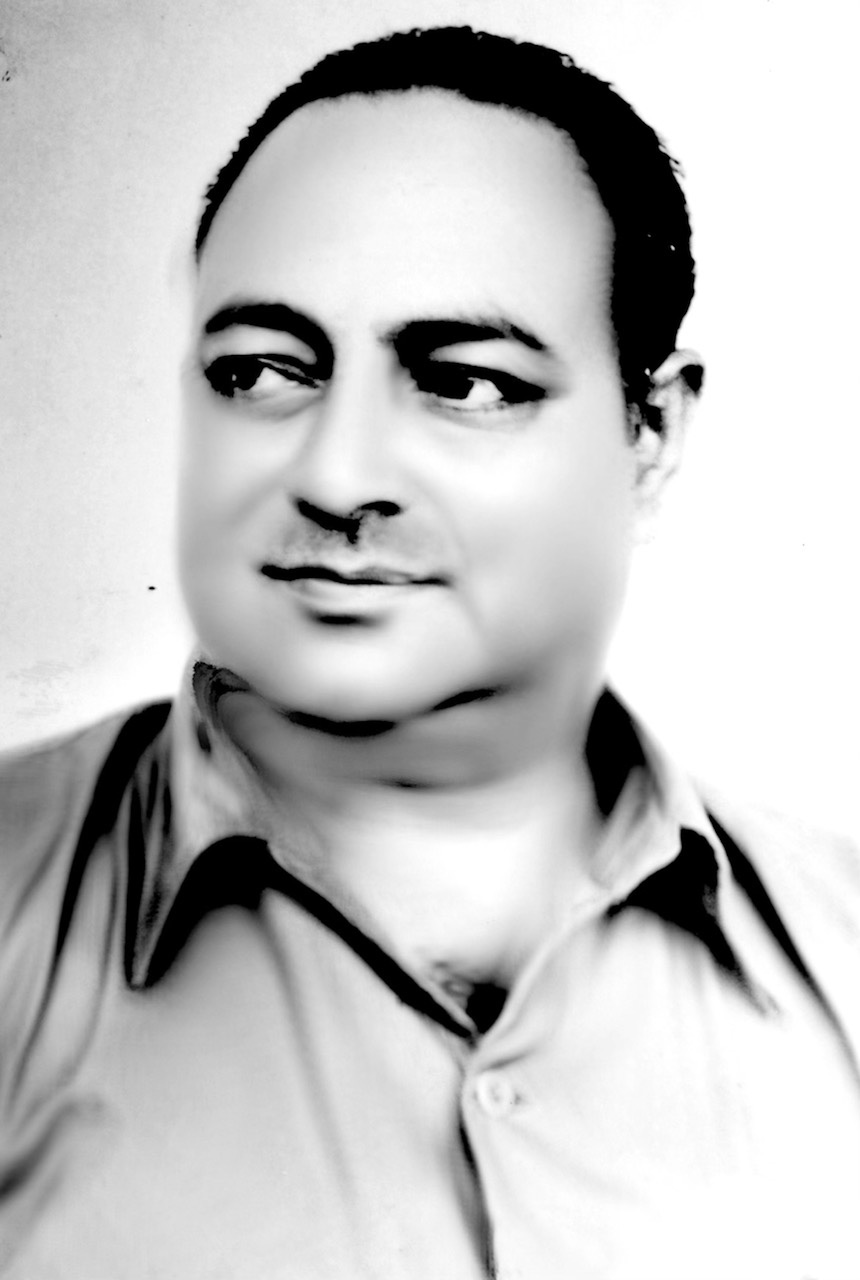
Balabhadra Singh II

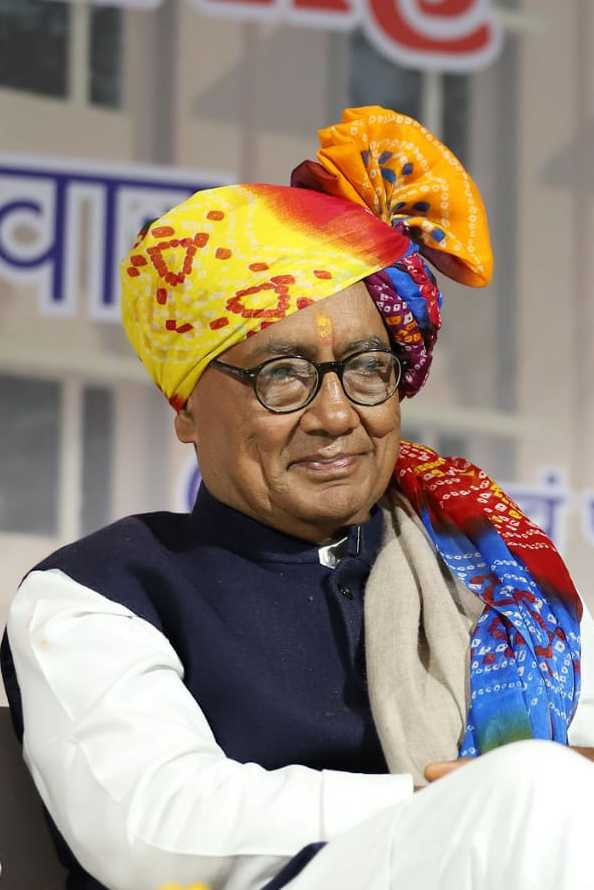
Digvijaya Singh

=== Patna ===
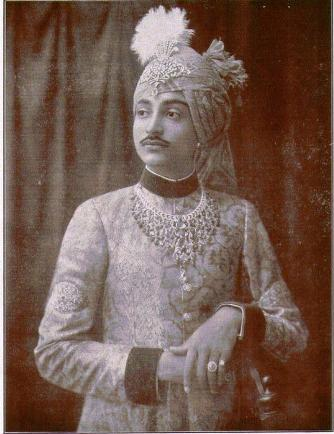
Rajendra Narayan Singh Deo

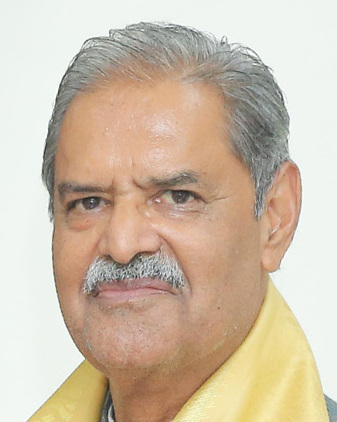
Kanak Vardhan Singh Deo

=== Tulsipur ===
Hardayal Singh

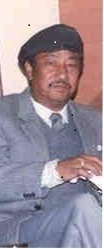
Prachanda Singh

=== Sirohi ===
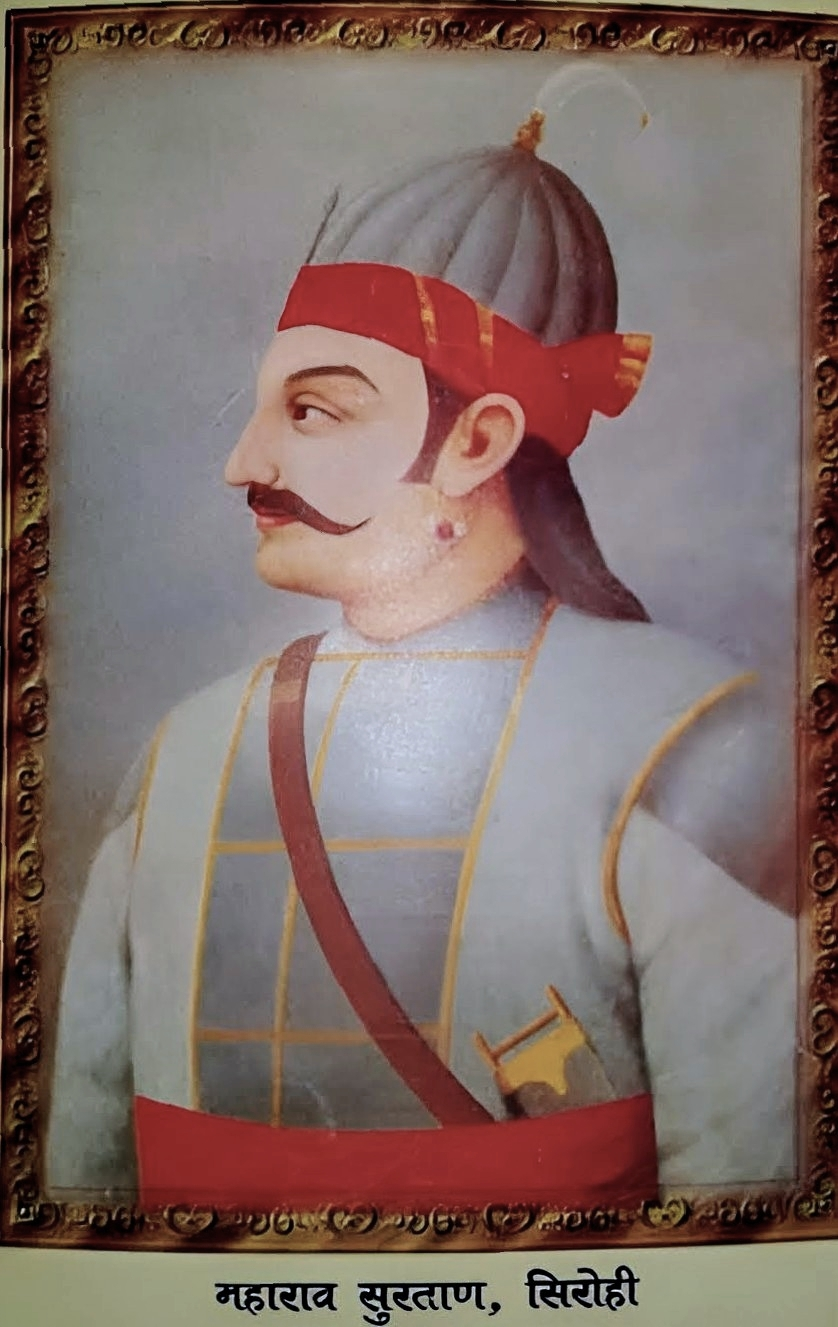
Rao Surtan Deora

=== Sambalpur ===
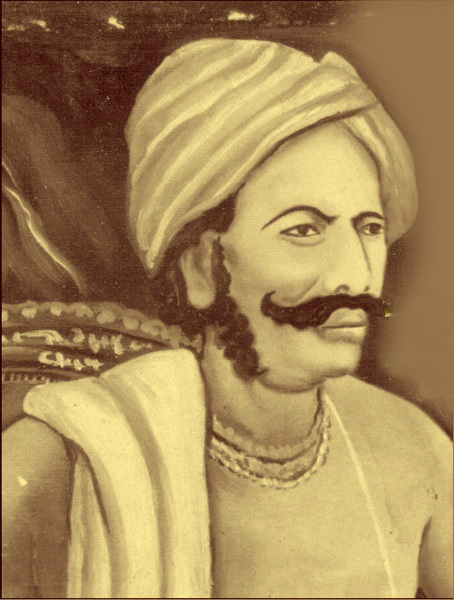
Surendra Sai

=== Sonepur ===
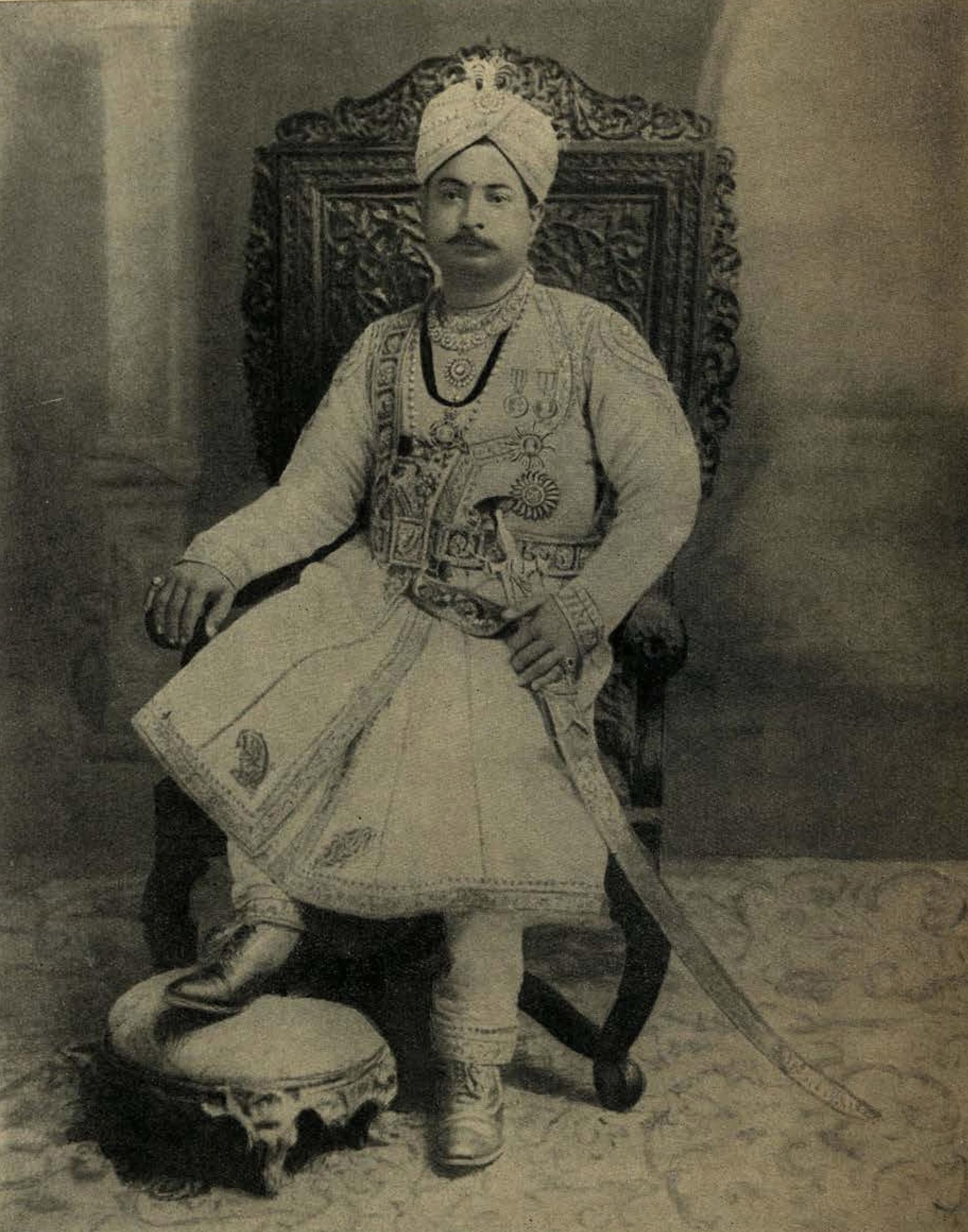
Bir Mitrodaya Singh Deo

=== Korea ===
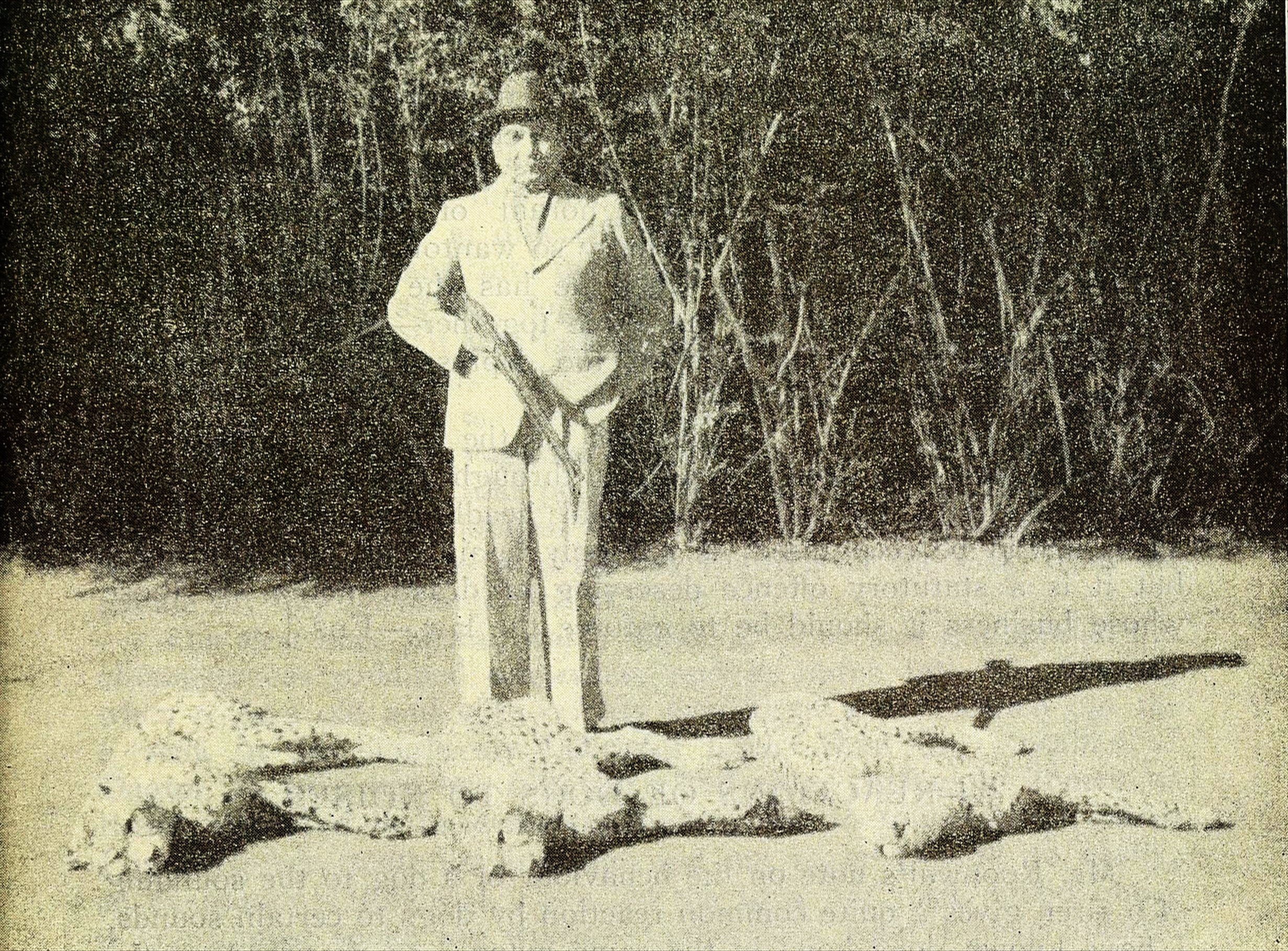
Ramanuj Pratap Singh Deo

== Forts and Palaces ==
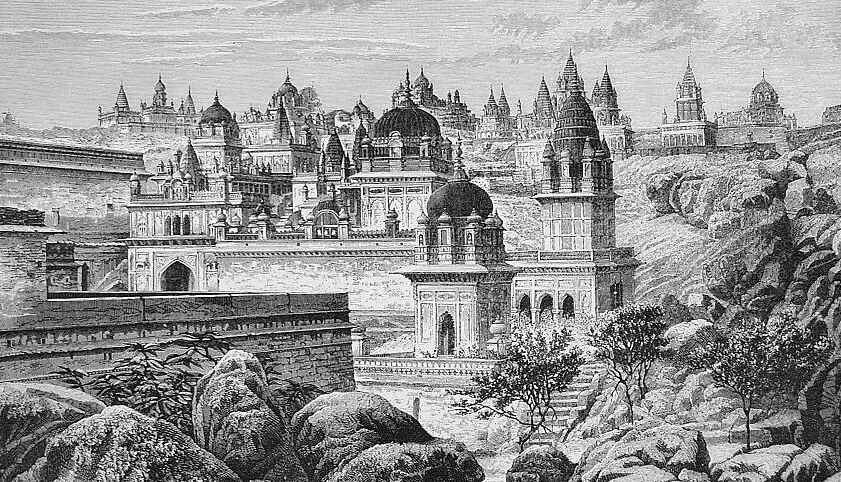
Jalore Fort

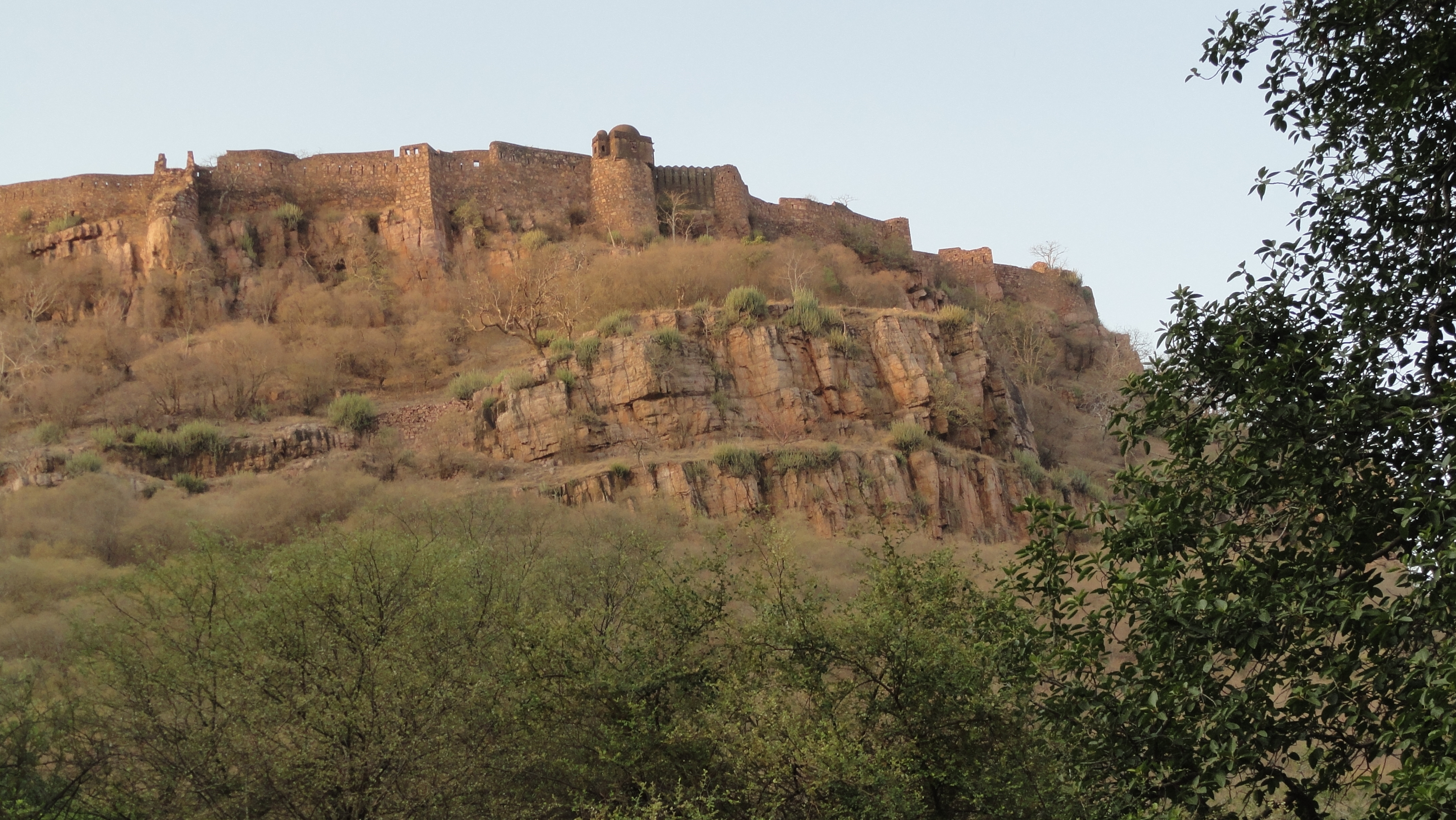
Ranthambore Fort

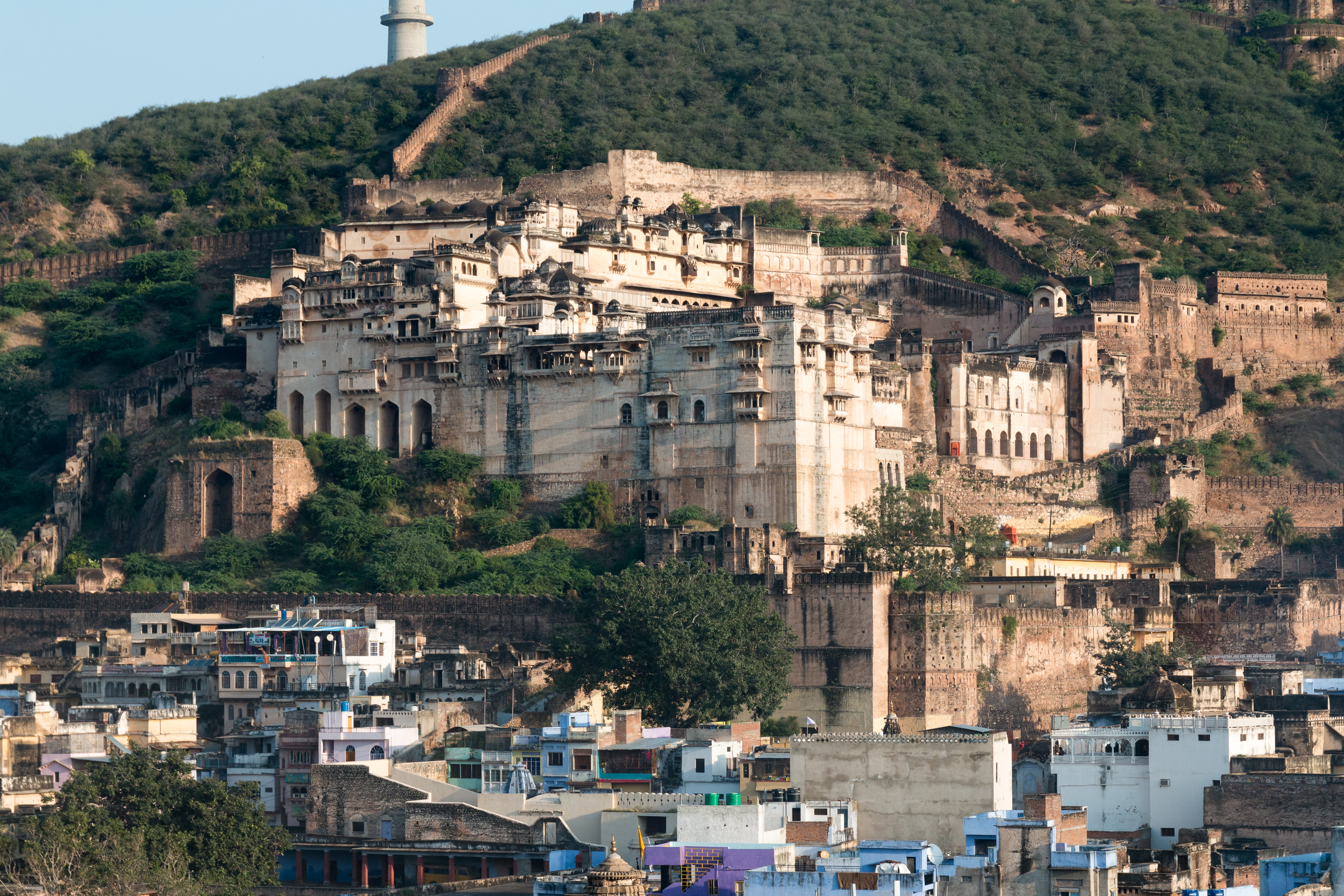
Taragarh Fort, Bundi

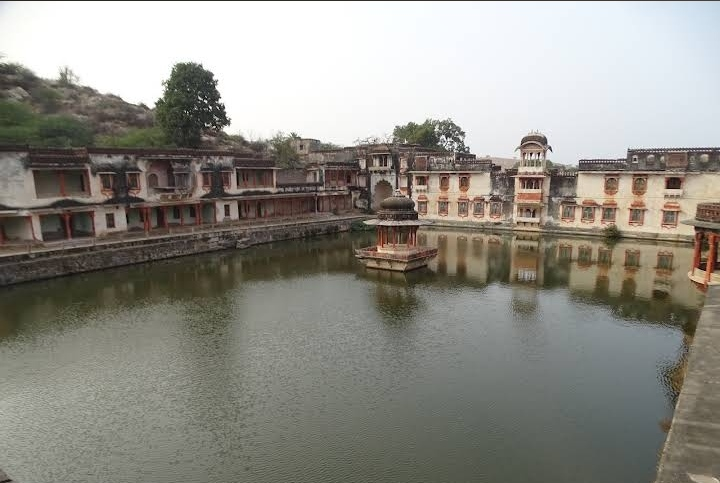
Phool Sagar Palace

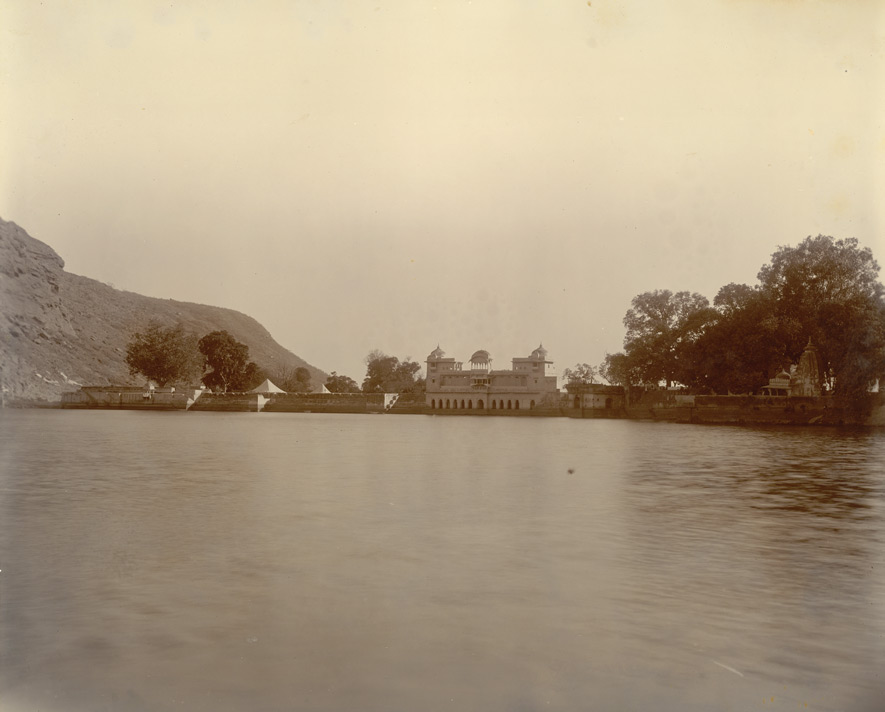
Sukh Mahal

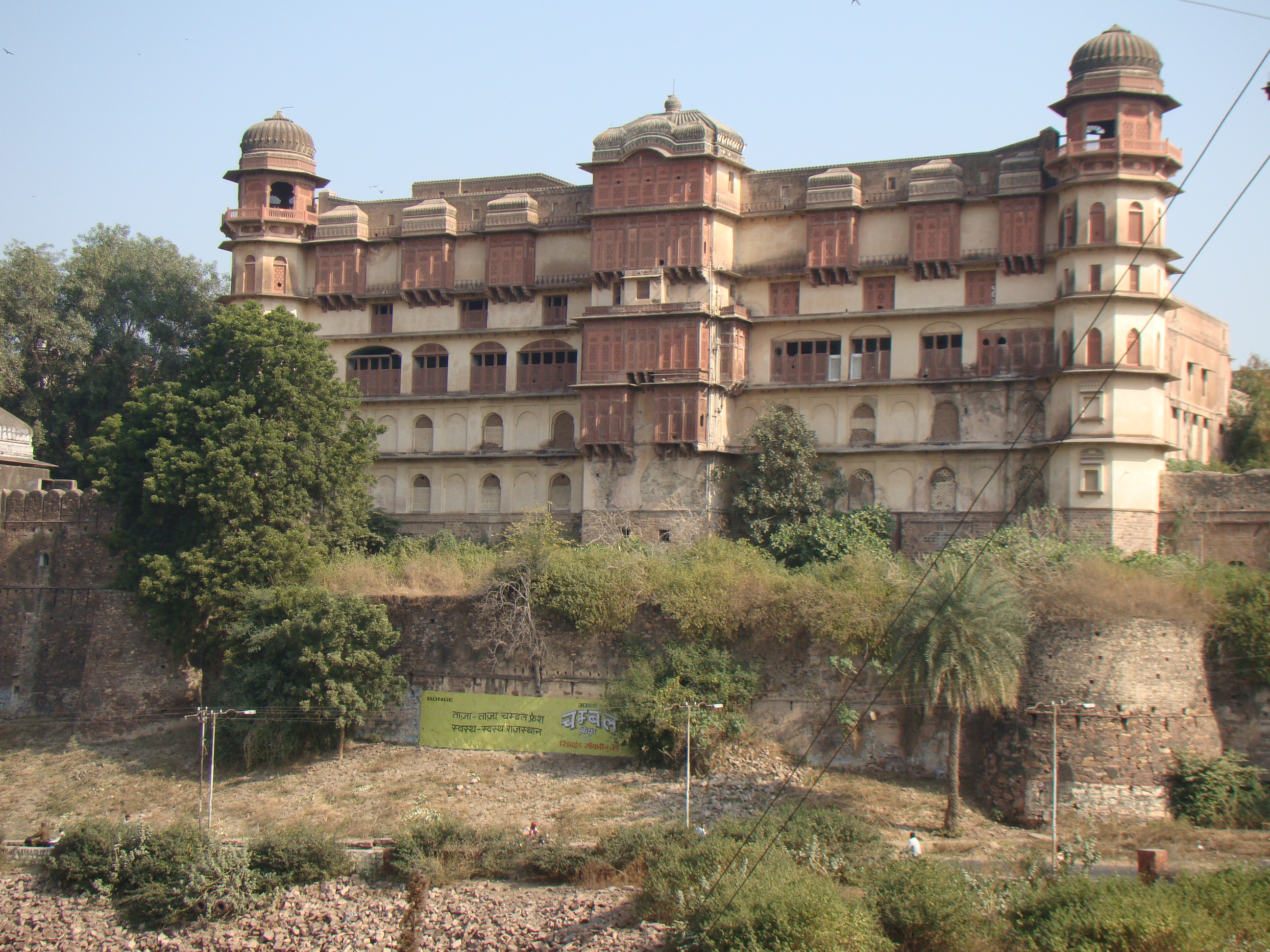
Garh Palace, Kota

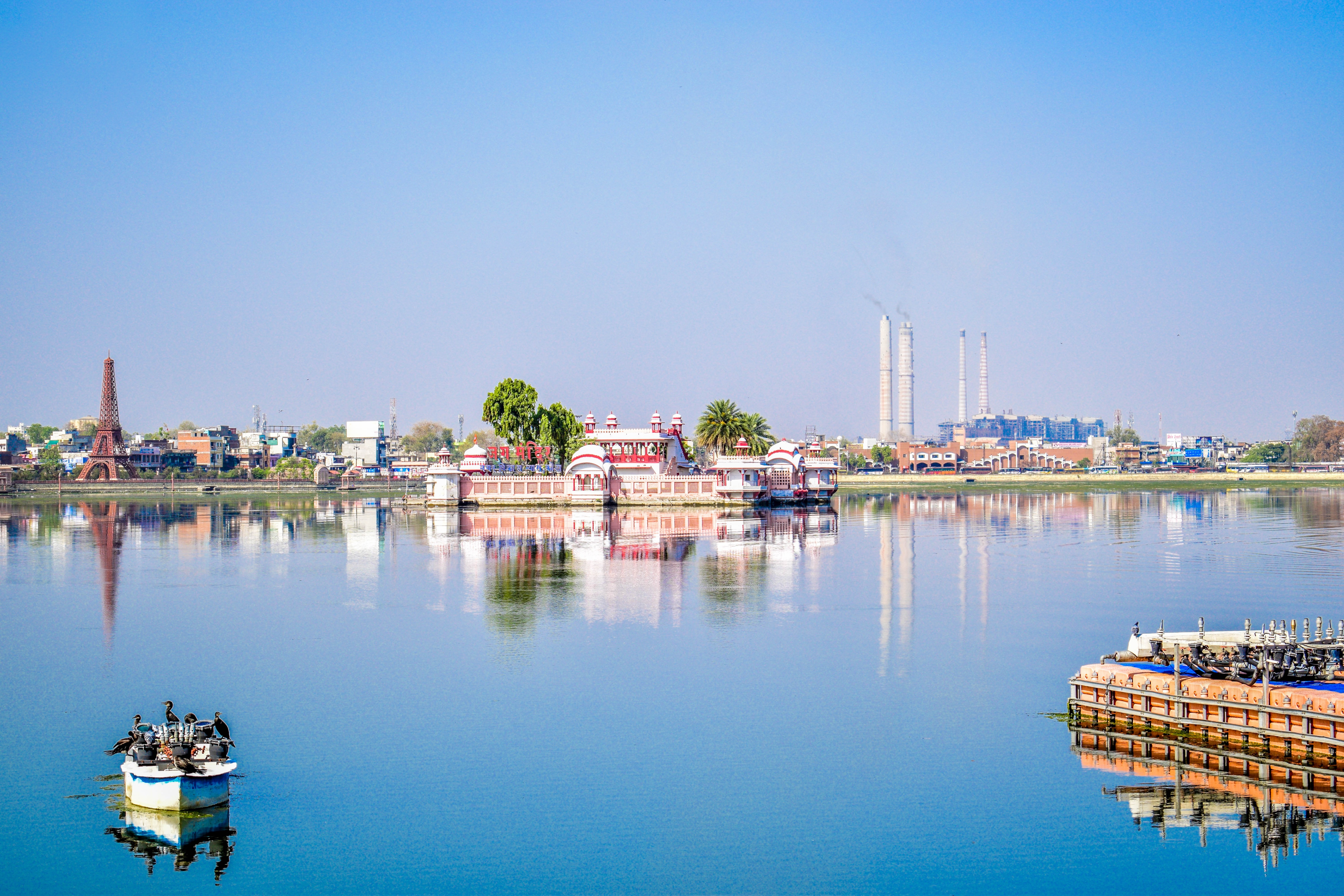
Jag Mandir Palace, Kota

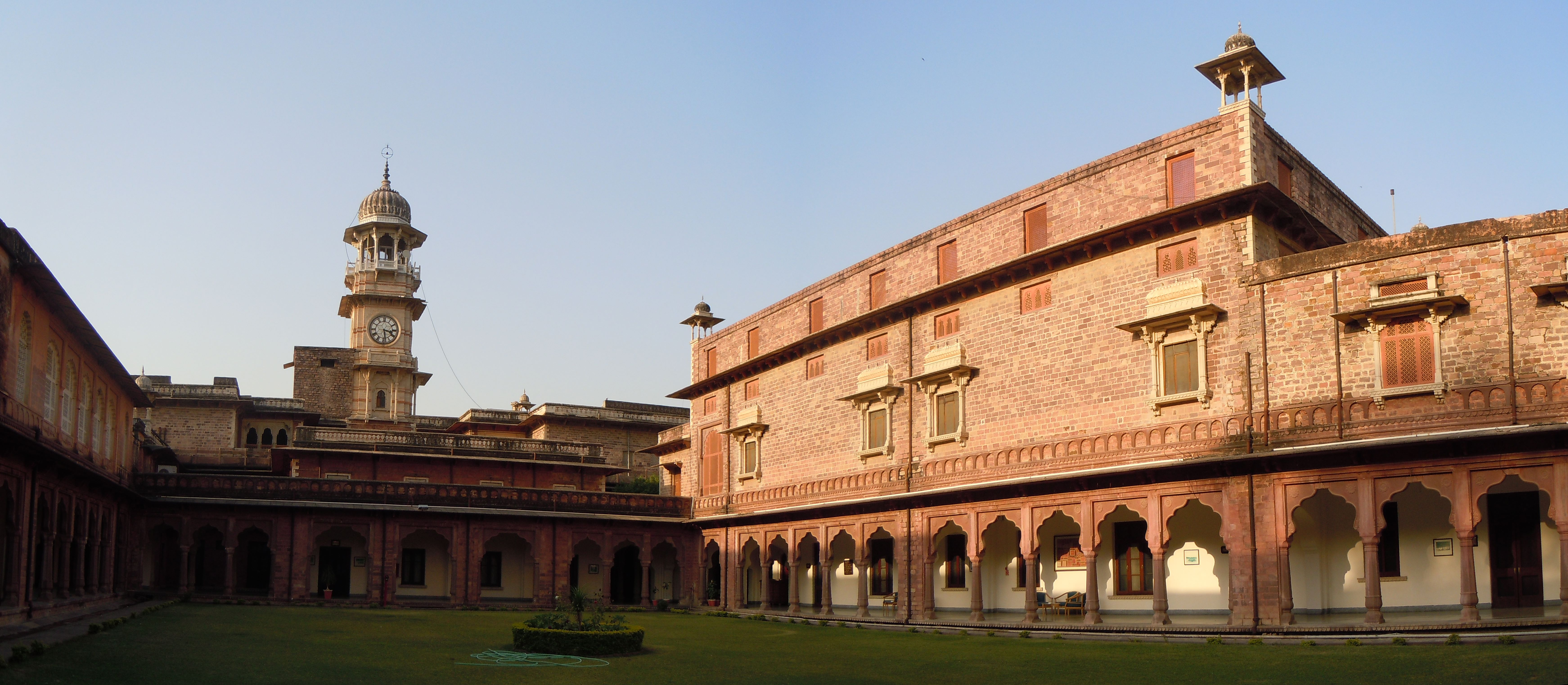
Umed Bhawan Palace

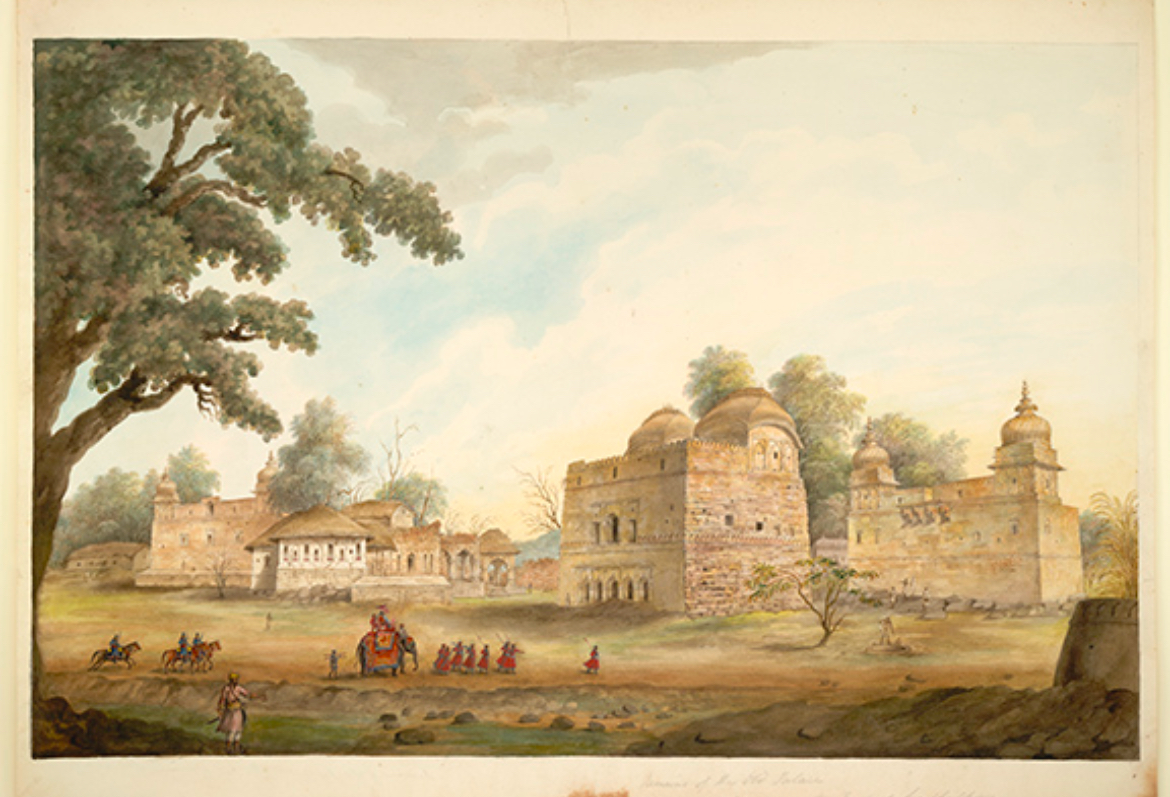
Sambalpur Palace

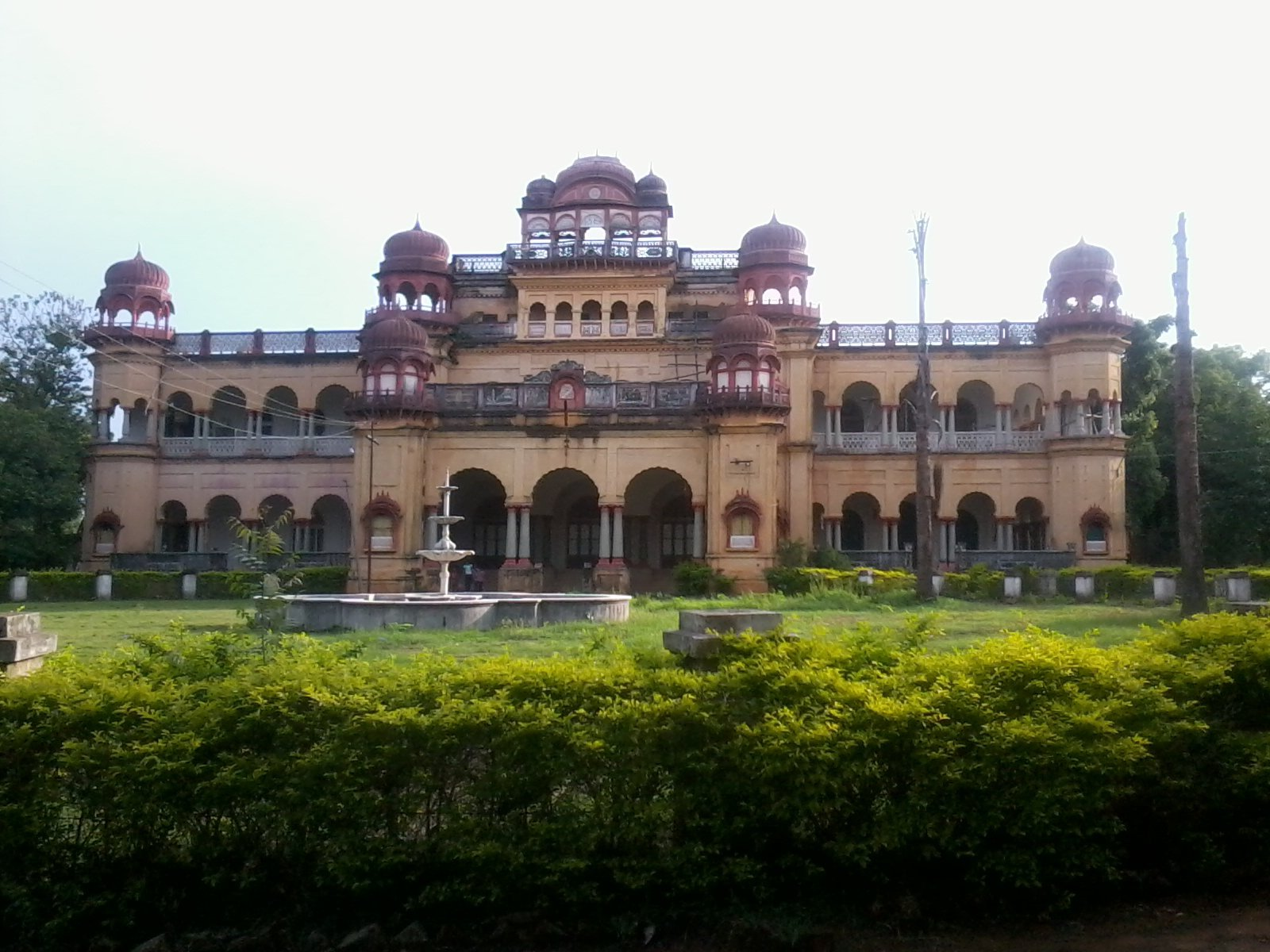
Balangir palace

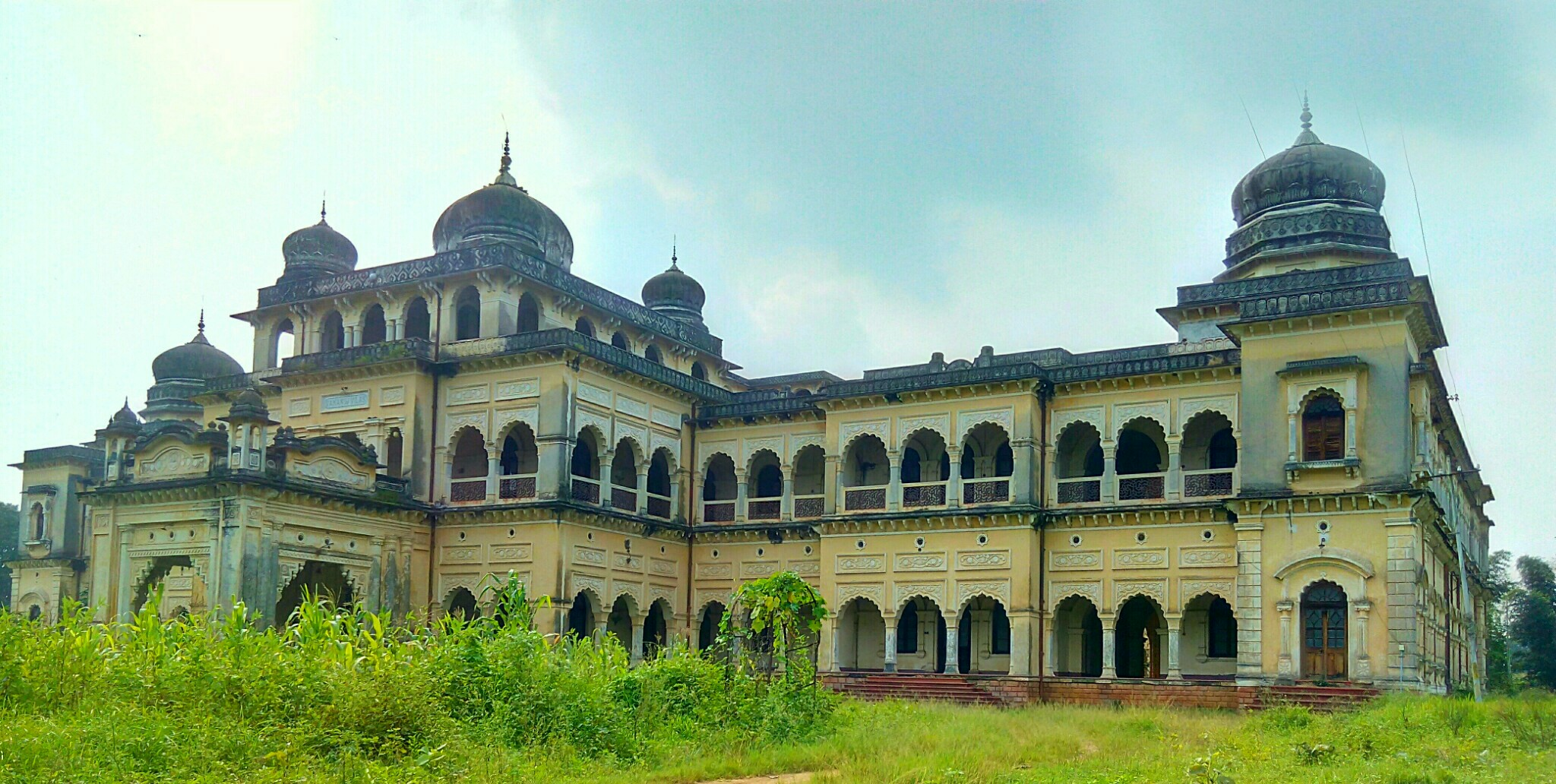
Koriya palace

== Flags ==
Flag	Kingdom
	Sirohi
	Bundi
	Kotah
	Vav (Wao)
	Dhami
	Sonepur
	Korea
