= Sunel-Tappa =

Sunel-Tappa is a small region which was merged on 1 November 1956 into Rajasthan state from then Madhya Pradesh state. Reason for merging was that it was far from its then Bhanpura tehsil as well its then Mandsaur district. At present it is located in southern-western part of Jhalawar district of Rajasthan. Sunel is a small town in and Ahu river flows in this region.
