= Mahindu =

King of Naddula from 994 to 1015

King of Naddula
- Reign: c. 994–1015 CE
- Predecessor: Vigrahapala
- Successor: Ashvapala
- Dynasty: Chahamanas of Naddula
- Father: Vigrahapala

Mahindu (r. c. 994–1015 CE), also known as Mahendra or Mahindra, was an Indian king belonging to the Naddula Chahamana dynasty. He ruled the area around Naddula (present-day Nadol in Rajasthan).

== Reign ==
Mahindu succeeded his father Vigrahapala on the throne of Naddula.

According to the Bijapur inscription of the Hastikundi Rashtrakuta prince Dhavala, a ruler named Mahendra helped him against Durlabharaja. F. Kielhorn identified this Mahendra with Mahindu, the king of Naddula. D. R. Bhandarkar identified Durlabharaja as Durlabharaja Chaulukya. However, historian Dasharatha Sharma points out that Durlabharaja Chaulukya had not ascended the throne when this inscription was issued. Sharma, therefore, identified Durlabharaja as Durlabharaja Chahamana,

Dhavala seems to have been a close ally of Mahindu, and helped him against the Paramara king Munja.

=== Hemachandra's legend ===
Dvyashrya-Kavya, a legendary text by the Chaulukya court scholar Hemachandra, states that Mahendra-raja organized a swayamvara (husband-choosing ceremony) for his sister Durlabha-devi. Besides Durlabharaja, he invited the rulers of Anga, Andhra, Kashi, Kuru, Mathura and Ujjayini to this ceremony. Durlabha-devi chose Durlabharaja as her husband. Out of jealousy, the other invitees formed a confederacy and attacked his contingent, while he was returning to his capital. Durlabharaja defeated their combined army. Mahindu's younger daughter Lakshmi-devi married Nagaraja, the younger brother of Durlabharaja.

On basis of this legend, historian R. B. Singh theorizes that the Chahamana-Chaulukya rivalry concluded with a matrimonial alliance. He also concludes that Mahindu was a powerful ruler, because of which several distant kings responded to the swayamvara invitation.

Other historians doubt the historicity of this legend. According to A. K. Majumdar, the king of Naddula was a relatively insignificant ruler, and it is hard to believe that so many major rulers left their kingdoms to attend his ceremony at a time when northern India was under attacks from Mahmud of Ghazni. Moreover, it is unlikely that Durlabharaja would have been able to defeat a confederacy of all these powerful kings.

== Successors ==
Mahindu had two sons: Ashvapala and Anahilla. He was succeeded by Ashvapala, followed by Ashvapala's son Ahila. Anahilla succeeded Ahila on the throne of Naddula.
