= Jojalladeva =

King of Naddula from 1090 to 1110

King of Naddula
- Reign: c. 1090–1110 CE
- Predecessor: Prithvipala
- Successor: Asharaja
- Dynasty: Chahamanas of Naddula
- Father: Jendraraja

Jojalla-deva (r. c. 1090–1110 CE) was an Indian king belonging to the Naddula Chahamana dynasty. He ruled the area around Naddula (present-day Nadol in Rajasthan). The Chahamana records claim that he invaded the Chaulukya kingdom, and occupied their capital Anahilapataka.

== Reign ==
Jojalladeva was a son of the Chahamana king Jendraraja. He is also known as Jojaladeva, Jojaka and Yojaka. He succeeded his elder brother Prithvipala on the throne of Naddula.

According to the Sundha Hill inscription, Jojalladeva occupied the Chaulukya capital Anahillapura by force. The veracity of this claim is doubtful, because the Chaulukya king Karna was a powerful ruler. According to the epic poem Hammira Mahakavya, the neighbouring Shakambhari Chahamana king Dushala (Durlabharaja III) also defeated Karna. Historian R. B. Singh theorizes that the two Chahamana branches formed an alliance against Karna and occupied the Chaulukya capital for a short time. According to historian A. K. Majumdar, Jojalladeva may have raided the Chaulukya capital while Karna was engaged in a conflict at another place. According to Dasharatha Sharma, there is another possibility: Jojalladeva invaded the Chaulukya kingdom during the early reign of Karna's son Jayasimha Siddharaja, who was a minor at the time.

An inscription records Jojalladeva's order to allow courtesans to attend festivals and processions of deities. Some Brahmins, as well as the Jains of Vidhichaitya movement, were opposed to dancing of courtesans in their temples. Jojalladeva's issued an order to punish any "ascetic, old or learned person" who opposed the presence of courtesans. The courtesans were entitled to attend the religious ceremonies with their managers, artists and musicians.

Jojalladeva probably died heirless, because of which he was succeeded by his younger brother Asharaja.
