= Chahamanas of Naddula =

Dynasty of Rajasthan, India (950–1197)

- c. 950 CE–1197 CE
- Find spots of the inscriptions issued during the Naddula Chahamana reign.
- Capital: Naddula
- Religion: Hinduism (official); Jainism (revered)
- Government: Monarchy
- History
  - Established: c. 950 CE
  - Battle of Kasahrada (1197): 1197 CE
- Today part of: India

The Chahamanas of Naddula, also known as the Chauhans of Nadol, were an Indian dynasty. They ruled the Marwar area around their capital Naddula (present-day Nadol in Rajasthan) between 10th and 12th centuries. They belonged to the Chahamana (Chauhan) clan of the Rajputs.

The Chahamanas of Naddula were an offshoot of the Chahamanas of Shakambhari. Their founder, Lakshmana (alias Rao Lakha), was the son of the 10th century Shakambari ruler Vakpatiraja I. His brother Simharaja succeeded their father as the Shakambhari ruler. The subsequent rulers fought against the neighbouring kingdoms of the Paramaras of Malwa, the Chaulukyas, the Ghaznavids, as well as the Chahamanas of Shakambhari. The last ruler Jayata-simha was probably defeated by the Ghurid Empire general Qutb al-Din Aibak in 1197 CE.

== History ==
=== Early rulers ===
Lakshmana, the founder of the dynasty, was a son of the Shakambhari Chahamana king Vakpatiraja I. While his elder brother Simharaja succeeded Vakpatiraja, he carved out a principality at Naddula in the mid-10th century. According to the legendary text Lakhana Raula Prabandha, the Brahmanas of Naddula hired him to protect the town against freebooters called the Medas.

Lakshmana's son Shobhita defeated the ruler of Arbuda (modern Mount Abu), who probably belonged to a Paramara branch. Shobhita's son Baliraja fought against the Paramara king Munja, with both the sides claiming victory. Baliraja probably died heirless, and was succeeded by Lakshmana's younger son Vigrahapala.

Vigrahapala's son Mahindu helped the Hastikundi Rashtrakuta prince Dhavala against one Durlabharaja, who can be identified as the Shakambhari Chahamana king Durlabharaja. Mahindu was succeeded by his elder son Ashvapala, whose son and successor Ahila seems to have repulsed an invasion by the Chaulukya king Bhima I. Ahila, who probably died heirless, was succeeded by Mahindu's younger son Anahilla.

=== Expansion ===
Anahilla (r. c. 1024-1055 CE) was among the dynasty's most successful rulers, and greatly expanded the kingdom. According to the Sundha Hill inscription, he defeated Bhima, captured Shakambhari, killed the Paramara king Bhoja's general Sadha, and defeated the Turushkas (Turkic people). Historian Dasharatha Sharma theorizes that the Bhoja occupied Shakambhari after defeating the Shakambhari Chahamana king Viryarama, and Anahilla helped Viryarama's successor Chamundaraja in evicting the Paramaras. On the other hand, R. B. Singh theorizes that Anahilla helped Bhoja against Viryarama, but their alliance broke, leading to a conflict between Anahilla and Bhoja's general Sadha. The Turushkas were probably a Ghaznavid force.

Anahilla was succeeded by his sons Balaprasada and Jendraraja one after another. Jendraraja appears to have defeated a Chaulukya ruler, either Bhima I or Bhima's successor Karna. Jendraraja's sons Prithvipala, Jojalladeva, and Asharaja succeeded him one after another. Prithvipala defeated Karna, probably in alliance with his other neighbours such as the Shakambhari Chahamana king Vigraharaja III and the Paramara king Udayaditya. He also seems to have defeated a Paramara chief of Vagada. He Jojalladeva is said to have occupied the Chaulukya capital Anahillapura, possibly during a raid.

=== Dynastic feuds ===
Asharaja was dethroned by Prithvipala's son Ratnapala around 1119 CE. As a result, he sought shelter from the Chaulukya king Jayasimha Siddharaja. As a Chaulukya vassal, he participated in Jayasimha's war against the Paramara king Naravarman. Meanwhile, Ratnapala was succeeded by his son Rayapala, who was dethroned by Asharaja's son Katukaraja around 1145 CE. Katukaraja was succeeded by Asharaja's younger son Alhanadeva, who served as a vassal to the Chaulukya king Kumarapala. For a brief period, Kumarapala replaced Alhanadeva with his own governor at Naddula, when the Chaulukyas were fighting a war against the Shakambhari Chahamana king Arnoraja. Later, he reinstated Alhanadeva as the ruler of Naddula. In the mid-12th century, Alhanadeva curbed some disturbances in Saurashtra on behalf of Kumarapala.

Alhanadeva was succeeded by his elder son Kelhanadeva, while his younger son Kirtipala established the Chahamana principality at Jalore.

=== Decline ===
In 1178 CE, the Ghurids led by Muhammad of Ghor, invaded the Chaulukya kingdom and temporarily dislodged Kelhanadeva from Naddula. Kelhanadeva, his brother Kirtipala and other Chaulukya feudatories helped the Chaulukyas defeat the Ghurids at the Battle of Kasahrada in 1178 CE. As a result, Kelhana managed to regain control of Naddula. As a Chaulukya feudatory, Kelhanadeva also repulsed an invasion by the Yadava ruler Bhillama V.

By the time of Kelhanadeva's son Jayatasimha, the Ghurids had grown more powerful, having defeated the Shakambhari Chahamana king Prithviraja III. In 1197 CE, the Ghurid general Qutb al-Din Aibak invaded Naddula and surrounding regions. Jayatasimha abandoned Naddula, and probably joined a Hindu confederacy to oppose the Ghurids at Mount Abu. Qutb al-Din Aibak defeated this confederacy, and the Naddula kingdom disintegrated into several principalities in the subsequent days. Samantasimha, who is attested by five inscriptions dated 1199-1201 CE, might have been a successor of Jayatasimha.

== Coinage ==
Alexander Cunningham had two Horseman and bull type coins, he categorised those coins as "unknown Rajput coins". One coin he published had legend on the reverse as "Sri Kalhana or Kilahana". Scholar Prafulla Chandra Roy suggested that these coins belong to Chauhan dynasty of Nadol. Col James Tod also procured many Horseman and bull type coins from Nadol.

== List of rulers ==
Following is a list of Chahmana rulers of Naddula, with approximate period of reign, as estimated by R. B. Singh:

List of Chauhan rulers of Naddula
Serial no.	Kings	Reign (CE)
1	Lakshmana alias Rao Lakha or Lakhan	950–982
2	Shobhita	982–986
3	Baliraja	986–990
4	Vigrahapala	990–994
5	Mahindra alias Mahindu	994–1015
6	Ashvapala	1015–1019
7	Ahila	1019–1024
8	Anahilla	1024–1055
9	Balaprasada	1055–1070
10	Jendraraja	1070–1080
11	Prithvipala	1080–1090
12	Jojalladeva	1090–1110
13	Asharaja alias Ashvaraja	1110–1119
14	Ratnapala	1119–1132
15	Rayapala	1132–1145
16	Katukaraja	1145–1148
17	Alhanadeva	1148–1163
18	Kelhanadeva	1163–1193
19	Jayatasimha	1193–1197

== Family tree ==
Chahamanas of Naddula

Lakshmana^{(1)} r. c. 950-982
Shobhita^{(2)} r. c. 982-986	Vigrahapala^{(4)} r. c. 990-994
Baliraja^{(3)} r. c. 986-990	Mahindu^{(5)} r. c. 994-1015
Ashvapala^{(6)} r. c. 1015-1019	Anahilla^{(8)} r. c. 1024-1055
Ahila^{(7)} r. c. 1019-1024	Balaprasada^{(9)} r. c. 1055-1070	Jendraraja^{(10)} r. c. 1070-1080
Prithvipala^{(11)} r. c. 1080-1090	Jojalladeva^{(12)} r. c. 1090-1110	Asharaja^{(13)} r. c. 1110-1119
Ratnapala^{(14)} r. c. 1119-1132	Katukaraja^{(16)} r. c. 1145-1148	Alhanadeva^{(17)} r. c. 1148-1163
Rayapala^{(15)} r. c. 1132-1145	Kelhanadeva^{(18)} r. c. 1163-1193
Jayatasimha^{(19)} r. c. 1193-1197
