= Baliraja =

King of Naddula from 986 to 990

King of Naddula
- Reign: c. 986–990 CE
- Predecessor: Shobhita
- Successor: Vigrahapala
- Dynasty: Chahamanas of Naddula
- Father: Shobhita

Bali-rāja (r. c. 986–990 CE) was an Indian king belonging to the Naddula Chahamana dynasty. He ruled the area around Naddula (present-day Nadol in Rajasthan). He was involved in a conflict with the Paramara king Munja, with both sides claiming victory.

== Reign ==
Baliraja was the son of his predecessor Shobhita.

The Chahamana-Paramara conflict that had started during his father's reign continued during his rule. According to the Sundha Hill inscription of his descendant, he defeated the Paramara king Munja. On the other hand, the Paramara court poet Parimala suggests that Munja was successful in this campaign. According to Parimala, Munja also defeated the Gurjara ruler, who had to take shelter with the ruler of Maru. Here, the Gurjara ruler can be identified with the Chaulukya king Mularaja. The identity of the ruler of Maru (Marwar) is not certain, but he was most probably Baliraja.

Baliraja seems to have died heirless, as he was succeeded by his paternal uncle Vigrahapala.
