= Bhima I =

King of Gujarat from 1022 to 1064

King of Gujarat
- Reign: 1022–1064
- Predecessor: Durlabharaja
- Successor: Karna
- Spouse: Bakula devi, Udayamati
- Issue: Mularaja, Kshemaraja, Karna, Haripala
- Dynasty: Chaulukya (Solanki)
- Father: Nagaraja

Find spots of inscriptions issued during the reign of Bhima I

Bhima I (r. 1022–1064) was a Chaulukya king who ruled parts of present-day Gujarat, India. The early years of his reign saw an invasion from the Ghaznavid ruler Mahmud, who sacked the Somnath temple. Bhima left his capital and took shelter in Kanthkot during this invasion, but after Mahmud's departure, he recovered his power and retained his ancestral territories. He crushed a rebellion by his vassals at Arbuda, and unsuccessfully tried to invade the Naddula Chahamana kingdom. Towards the end of his reign, he formed an alliance with the Kalachuri king Lakshmi-Karna, and played an important role in the downfall of the Paramara king Bhoja.

The earliest of the Dilwara Temples and the Modhera Sun Temple were built during Bhima's reign. The construction of Rani ki vav is attributed to his queen Udayamati.

== Early life ==
Bhima's father Nagaraja was a son of the Chaulukya king Chamunda-raja. Chamunda was succeeded by Nagaraja's brothers, Vallabha-raja and Durlabha-raja, in that order. Both Vallabha and Durlabha died childless. According to the 12th-century author Hemachandra, Durlabha was very fond of his nephew Bhima, and appointed Bhima as his successor before his death. Durlabha and Nagaraja died soon after Bhima's ascension to throne.

== Military career ==
=== Ghaznavid invasion ===
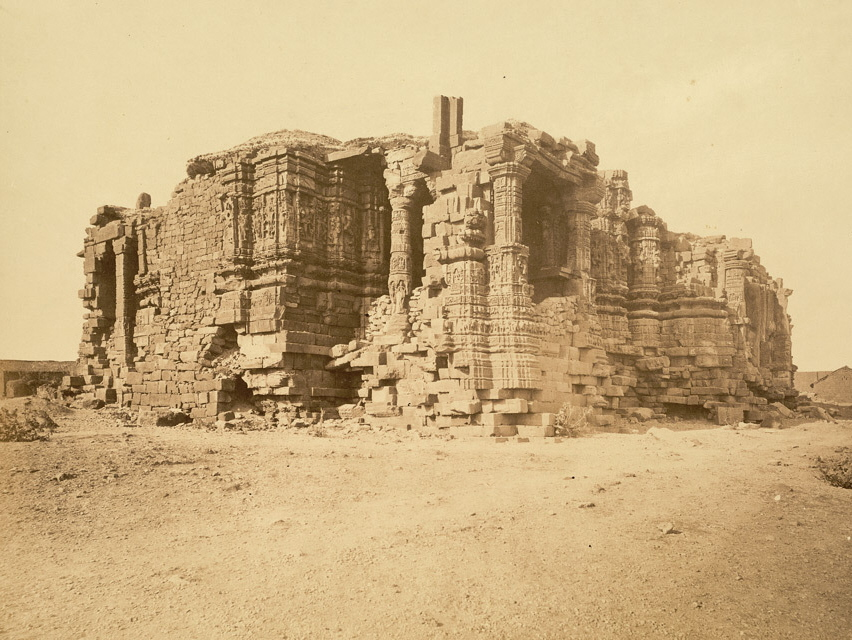
Ruins of the Somnath temple in 1869

Early during his reign, Bhīma faced an invasion by Mahmūd of Ghazni, whose plunder of the Somnāth temple has been described in detail by the medieval Muslim historians. According to Ali ibn al-Athīr, Mahmūd started out from Ghazni on 18 October 1025. At Multan, he planned his march in detail and gathered supplies. He left Multan on 26 November, with a large army well-equipped to cross the Thar Desert, and reached the Chaulukya capital in December 1025.

According to the Muslim accounts, Bhīma fled his capital Aṇahilapāṭaka (called Nahrwāla by the medieval Muslim historians). He took shelter in Kanthakot, allowing Mahmud to enter the Chaulukya capital unopposed. Mahmūd's sudden invasion, coupled with the lack of any fortifications in Nahrwāla, may have forced Bhima to abandon his capital. Other residents of the city also appear to have evacuated it, as the Muslim historians do not mention any massacre or looting in the Chaulukya capital.

Mahmūd rested at Nahrwāla for a few days, replenished his supplies, and then left for Somnāth. A relatively small force of 20,000 soldiers unsuccessfully tried to check Mahmūd's advance at Modhera. Historian A. K. Majumdar theorizes that the Modhera Sun Temple, might have been built to commemorate this defence. The upside down inscription in the cella of the temple proper evidences the destruction and reconstruction probably shortly after 1026.

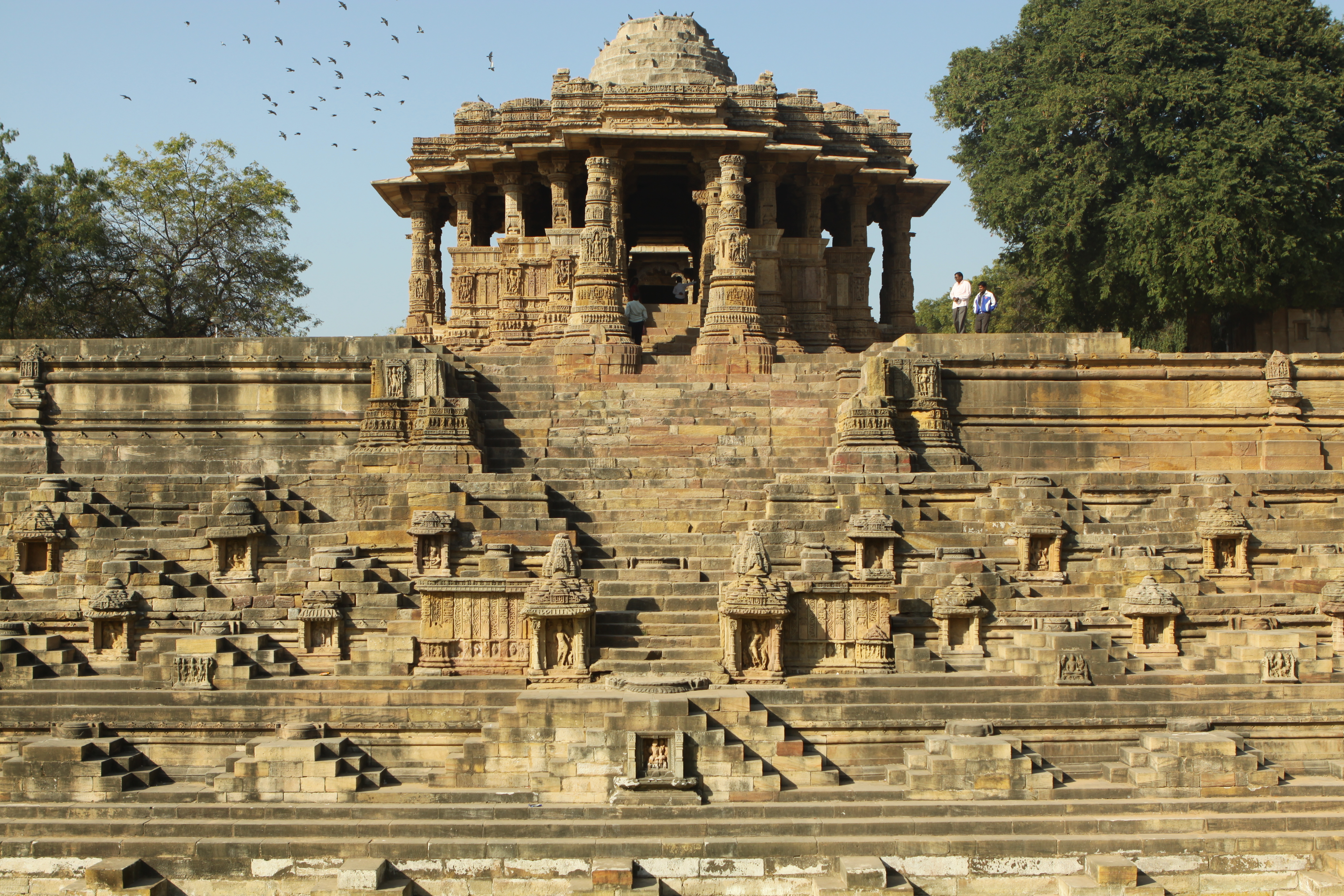
Sun Temple, Modhera was constructed around a year after Mahmud's invasion

Mahmūd then advanced to Delavada. Although the town surrendered without offering any resistance, Mahmūd massacred all its residents. Finally, Mahmūd's army reached Somnāth on 6 January 1026. The Muslim historians suggest that the town was well-defended, probably by a fort guarding the temple. According to Abu Sa'id Gardizi, the commander of the defending force fled to a nearby island. Other defenders put up a resistance, but Mahmūd managed to capture the fort by 8 January. Mahmūd then desecrated the temple, and looted a huge amount of wealth including jewels and silver idols.

During his return journey, Mahmūd came to know that a powerful Hindu king named Param Dev had gathered a large army to fight him. Gardezi, in his Kitab Zainu'l-Akhbar (c. 1048), states that Mahmūd chose to avoid any confrontation with this king. The invader was carrying back a large amount of looted wealth, which may have motivated him to avoid a battle. Mahmūd decided to return via Mansura in Sindh, although the route connecting Gujarat and Sindh was more dangerous than the desert route to Multan. Later Muslim historians also mention this incident. The 16th-century historian Firishta identified Param Dev with Bhīma I, calling him the king of Nahrwāla. Historian A. K. Majumdar agrees with this identification, arguing that "Param" might be a Muslim mistranscription of "Bhīma". Scholars who are critical of this theory identify Param dev with the Paramara king Bhoja, who ruled the neighbouring territory of Mālwa. K. N. Seth and Mahesh Singh point out that Bhīma had ascended the throne recently, and was not a powerful ruler at the time of Mahmud's raid. In fact, as attested by the Muslim historians, he had fled his capital and hid in Kanthkot. The Muslim historians before Firishta, such as Gardizi and Nizamuddin Ahmad, mention the king of Nahrwāla and Param Dev as two distinct kings. Unlike Bhīma, Bhoja was a powerful and famous ruler at that time. Bhoja was also a Shaivite, and according to the Udaipur Prashasti, had constructed a temple dedicated to Somanātha (an aspect of Śiva). Thus Mahmīd's desecration of the Somnāth temple in Gujarat would have motivated Bhoja to lead an army against him. Based on these evidences, several scholars identify Param Dev with Bhoja. "Param Dev" is probably a corruption of "Paramara-Deva" or of Bhoja's titles Paramabhattakara-Parameshvara.

=== Invasion of Sindh ===
According to the 12th-century scholar Hemacandra, who was patronized by the Caulukyas, Bhīma defeated Hammuka, a ruler of Sindh. This claim has also been repeated by the 14th-century chronicler Merutuṅga. Hemacandra's account of Bhīma's war against Sindh goes like this: one day Bhīma's spies told him that the kings of Andhra, Puṇḍra and Magadha obeyed him. On the other hand, Hammuka (the king of Sindhu, that is, Sindh) and Karṇa (the king of Cedi) not only refused to acknowledge his supremacy, but also defamed him. Bhīma then marched to Sindh, bridging and crossing the Indus river in the process. He defeated Hammuka, who was forced to acknowledge his supremacy. Later, he also defeated Karṇa.

There is no epigraphic evidence of Bhima having defeated the king of Sindh. In absence of any corroborating evidence, the historical accuracy of this account is uncertain. Historian A. K. Majumdar theorizes that Hammuka might have been a descendant of the Saindhava dynasty, which probably originated from Sindh. This dynasty is known to have last ruled western Saurashtra in 915. Like Hammuka, the names of its rulers ended in -ka: Ranaka, Jaika and Agguka.

=== Paramāras of Arbuda ===
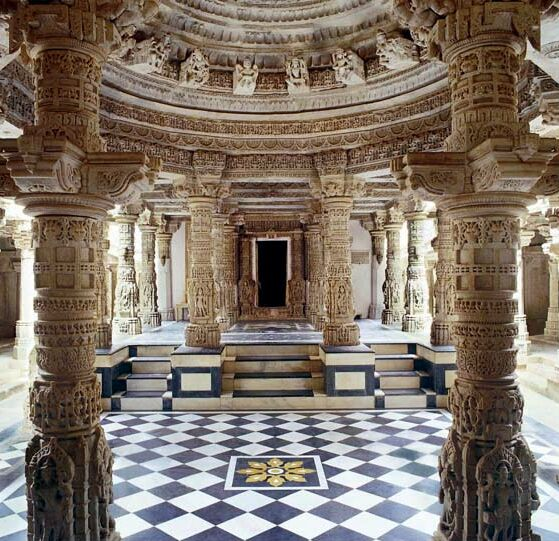
Vimal Vasahi Temple, Mount Abu

The Paramāra branch of Arbuda had been feudatories of the Caulukyas since Mūlarāja's reign. However, sometime before 1031, the Abu Paramāra ruler Dhandhuka rebelled against Bhīma. Bhima defeated him, and appointed Vimala as the new daṇḍapati (governor) of Arbuda. Vimala commissioned the shrine of Adinātha at Mount Abu in 1031, so Dhandhuka's rebellion must have happened before this year.

Dhandhuka took shelter with Bhoja, the Paramara king of Mālava. According to Jinaprabha Suri's Tirtha Kalpa, Bhima later restored Dhandhuka as his vassal.

A 1042 inscription of Dhandhuka's son Pūrṇapāla states that he was ruling over Arbuda-maṇḍala as a Mahārājadhirāja ("king of great kings"), after having defeated his enemy. This suggests that the Paramāras of Arbuda may have again rebelled against Bhīma's authority. However, the area was back under Bhīma's control by 1062, as attested by an inscription of Vimala.

=== Paramāras of Bhinmal ===
Bhima defeated and imprisoned Kṛṣṇa-deva, a ruler of the Paramāra branch of Bhinmal. However, the Naḍḍula Cāhamānas defeated Bhima, and freed Krishna-deva. This is attested by the Sundha Hill inscription of the Cāhamānas. Subsequently, Kṛṣṇa-deva ruled independent of Bhīma; his inscriptions describe him as a Mahārājadhirāja.

=== Cāhamanas of Naḍḍula ===
The Cāhamānas of Nāḍḍula ruled the territory to the north of the Caulukya kingdom. According to their Sundha Hill inscription, the Cāhamāna king Aṇahilla defeated Bhīma. Aṇahilla probably repulsed an invasion from Bhīma.

The Sundha Hill inscription as well as another Chahamana inscription state that the later king Anahilla also defeated the elephant force of Bhima. Anahilla is also said to have destroyed Bhima's army and captured a large part of his territory. His sons Balaprasada and Jendraraja also took part in the war against Bhima. Balaprasada forced Bhima to release Krishna-deva (the Paramara ruler of Bhimal) from the prison. Jendraraja defeated Bhima's force at Shanderaka (modern Sanderao).

The location of the battles suggests that Bhima was the aggressor in this war, and the Chahamanas repulsed his invasion. The war continued during the reign of Bhima's successor Karna.

=== Paramaras of Malwa ===
Bhima formed an alliance with the Kalachuri king Lakshmi-Karna, and played a significant role in the downfall of Bhoja, the Paramara dynasty of Malwa. This achievement has been recorded by several Chaulukya chroniclers and inscriptions.

The most detailed account of the rivalry between Bhima and Bhoja is given by the 14th-century chronicler Merutunga. However, it is hard to separate the historical truth from fiction in Merutunga's legendary account, which goes like this: Bhima and Bhoja were initially friends, but Bhoja made a plan to invade Gujarat. When Bhima's spy informed him about Bhoja's plan, Bhima sent his ambassador Damara to Bhoja's court. Damara instigated Bhoja to attack the Chalukyas of Kalyani, who had killed the earlier Paramara ruler Munja. Thus, Damara managed to divert Bhoja's attention away from Bhima's kingdom. While Bhoja was facing a war with the Kalyani Chalukyas, Damara lied to him that Bhima had also started a march against him. This worried Bhoja, who begged Damara to convince Bhima to abandon his march towards Malwa. Damara agreed to do so if Bhoja gifted Bhima an elephant couple, which Bhoja did.

Merutunga further states that while Bhima was engaged in a war against the king of Sindh, Bhoja's digambara general Kulachandra sacked the Chaulukya capital Anahilapataka. Subsequently, Merutunga mentions several incidents that suggest that the two kings maintained diplomatic ties. One day, while Bhoja was worshipping his family deity at a temple on the outskirts of his capital Dhara, the goddess warned him that he was surrounded by enemy soldiers. Bhoja was nearly killed by the Gujarati soldiers Aluya and Koluya, but managed to escape.

Merutunga finally describes Bhoja's death as follows: One day, the Kalachuri king Karna challenged Bhoja to a war or a temple-building contest. Bhoja chose the second option, and lost the contest to Karna. However, Bhoja refused to acknowledge Karna's supremacy. As a result, Karna invaded Malwa from the east, supported by 136 vassals. He also asked Bhima to invade Malwa from the east. Bhoja died of a disease, as these two kings invaded his kingdom. After his death, Karna captured his capital and all his wealth.

According to Merutunga, it was Karna who captured Dhara after Bhoja's death. Other Chaulukya chroniclers claim that Bhima captured Dhara. It is possible that Bhima raided Dhara at a later date. One particular chronicle Kirti-Kaumudi claims that Bhima captured Bhoja, but generously released him and spared his life. This is not corroborated by historical evidence.

=== Kalachuris of Tripuri ===
Bhima and the Kalachuri king Lakshmi-Karna remained allies until Bhoja's death. Subsequently, there seems to have been a dispute between them over sharing the spoils of their victory. The Chaulukya chroniclers claim that Bhima subdued Karna easily, but such claims are of little historical value. The 12th-century writer Hemachandra claims that Bhima sent his ambassador Damodara to Karna, demanding his share of the Paramara assets. Damodara's description of Bhima's power scared Karna, who started praising Bhima and gifted him Bhoja's golden throne. The 14th-century chronicler Merutunga claims that Bhima demanded half of Bhoja's kingdom from Karna. When Karna refused, Bhima's ambassador Damara entered Karna's palace with 32 foot soldiers and abducted Karna as the Kalachuri king slept. Karna ultimately made peace by surrendering a golden shrine to Bhima.

These accounts by the Chaulukya chroniclers appear to be historically inaccurate, as Karna was too powerful to be subdued by an ambassador of Bhima. Hemachandra does not mention Bhima's conflict with Bhoja at all, and Bhima's allies named by him in the struggle against Karna are all fictitious. Merutunga's account seems to be derived partly from Hemachandra's Dvyashraya and partly from Kirti-Kaumudi.

That said, there is some historical evidence of a conflict between Bhima and Karna. Karna's Rewa stone inscription claims that when he approached the Gurjara country (that is, Bhima's kingdom of Gujarat), the Gurjara women shed tears and became widows. It is possible that Bhima gained some advantage over Karna, after the Kalachuris were decisively defeated by the Kalyani Chalukya king Someshvara I.

== Personal life ==
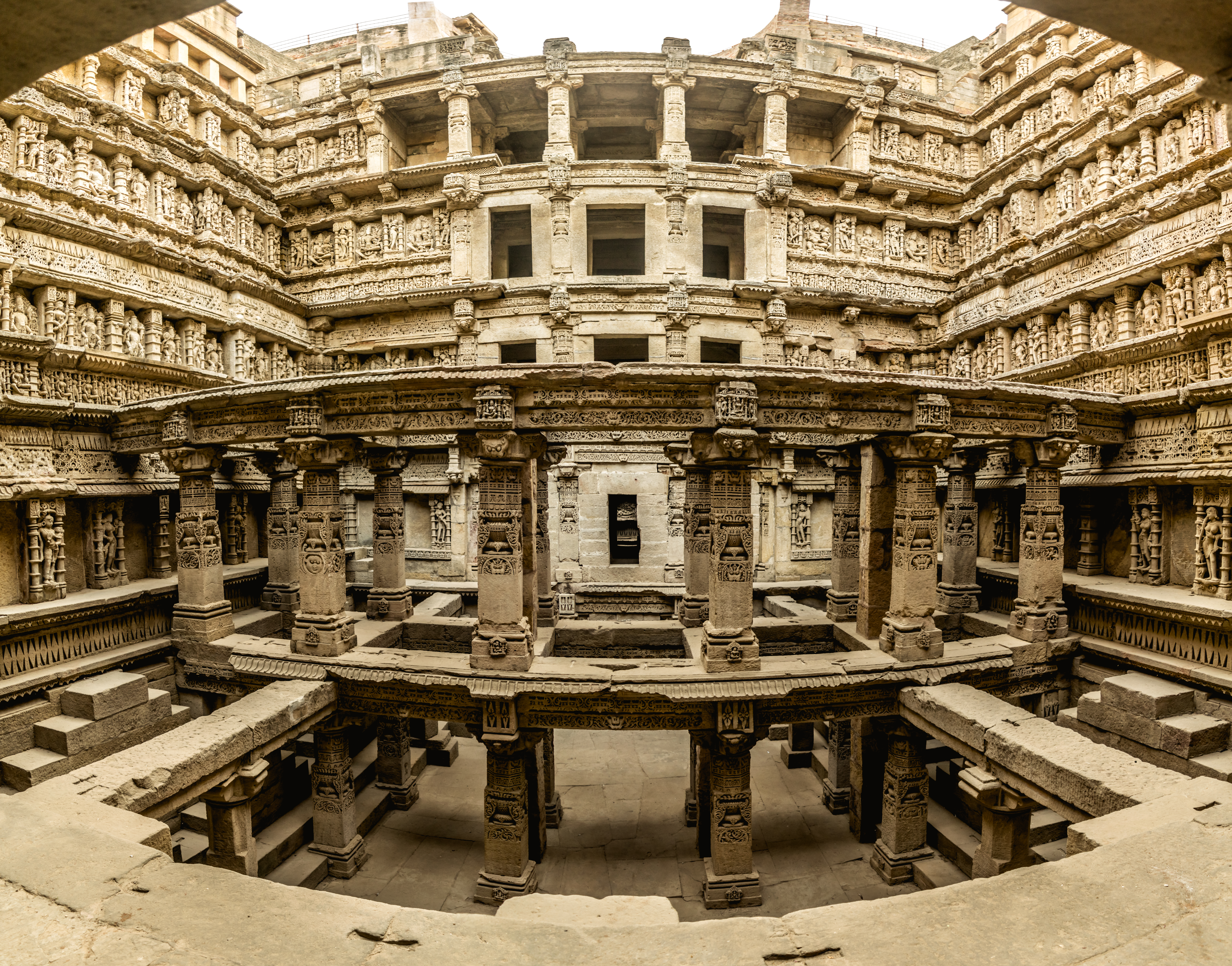
Popular tradition attributes the construction of Rani ki vav to Bhima's queen Udayamati

Bhima's queen was Udayamati. According to Hemachandra, he had three sons: Mularaja, Kshemaraja, and Karna. Mularaja died during Bhima's lifetime, and Kshemaraja rejected the throne. As a result, Karna succeeded Bhima.

Merutunga, on the other hand, states that Bhima's three sons were Mularaja, Karna and Haripala. Of these, Haripala was born of a courtesan named Bakuladevi. Historian A. K. Majumdar theorizes that Merutunga's account appears to be more accurate, since voluntary rejections of thrones were very rare. Hemachandra, who was a royal courtier, probably wanted to avoid mentioning the illegitimate son Haripala, and therefore, glossed over the genealogy.

=== Temples and constructions ===
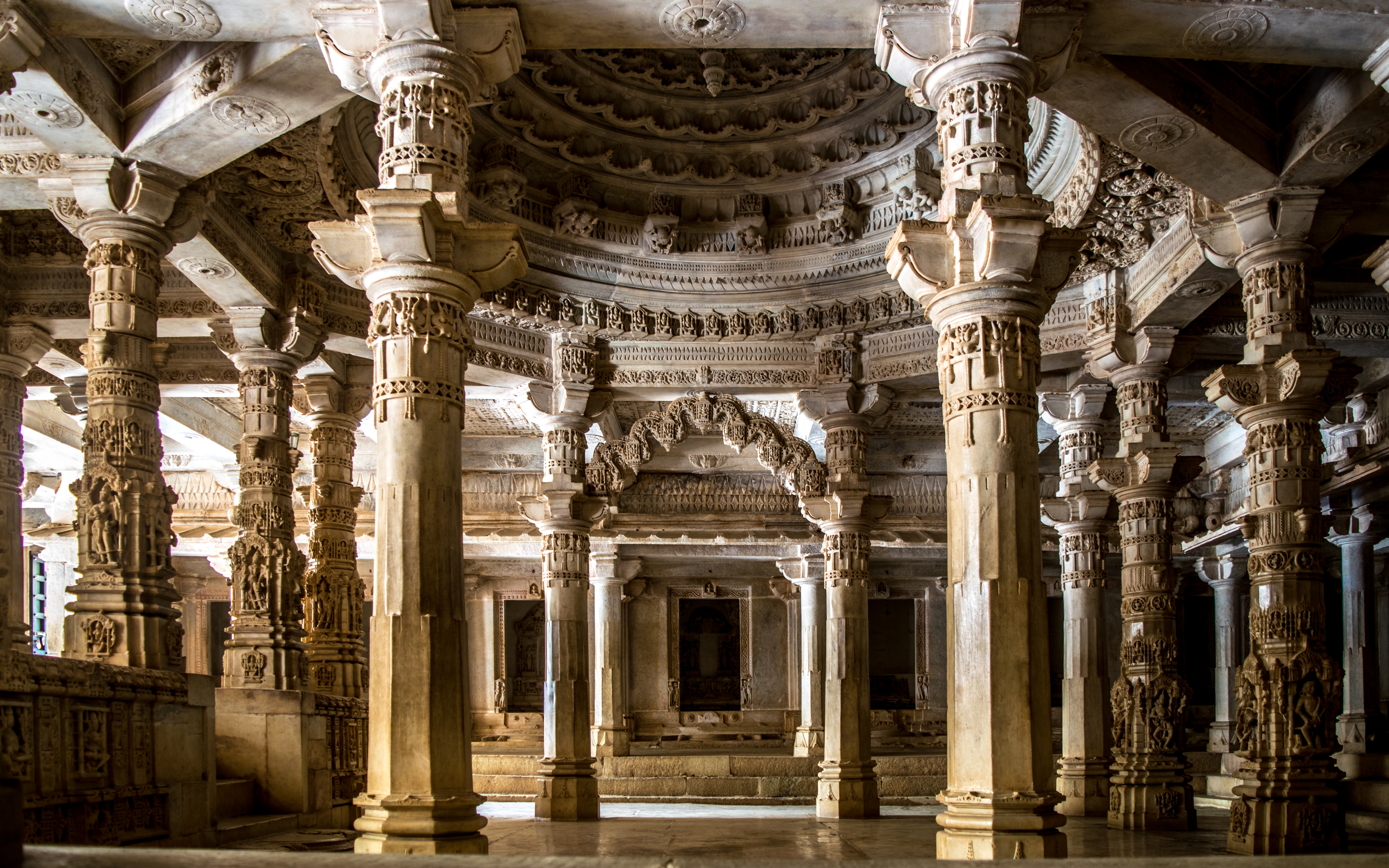
Intrinsic carvings inside Kumbharia Mahavira temple

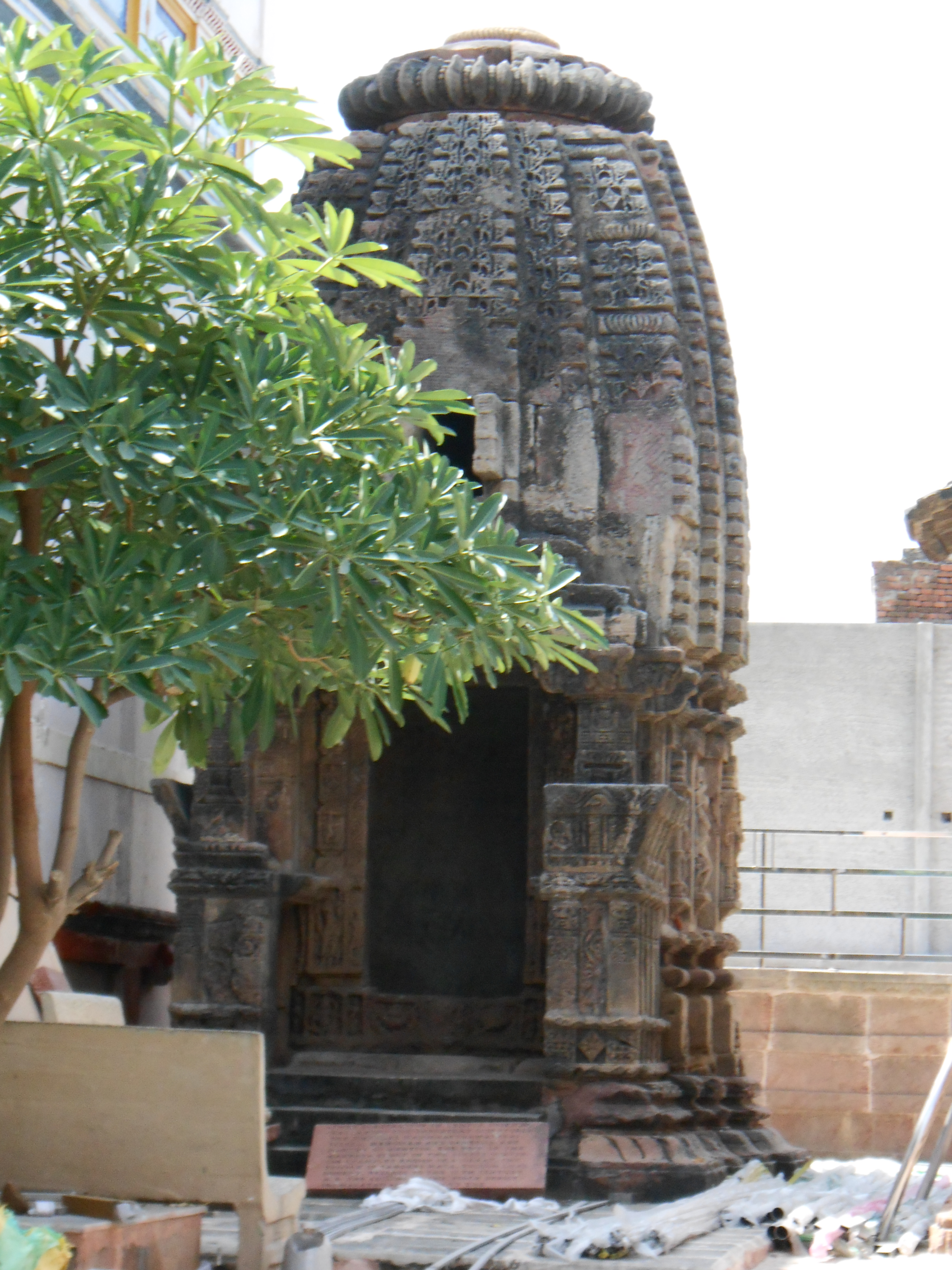
Shiva temple near Sanderi Mata temple

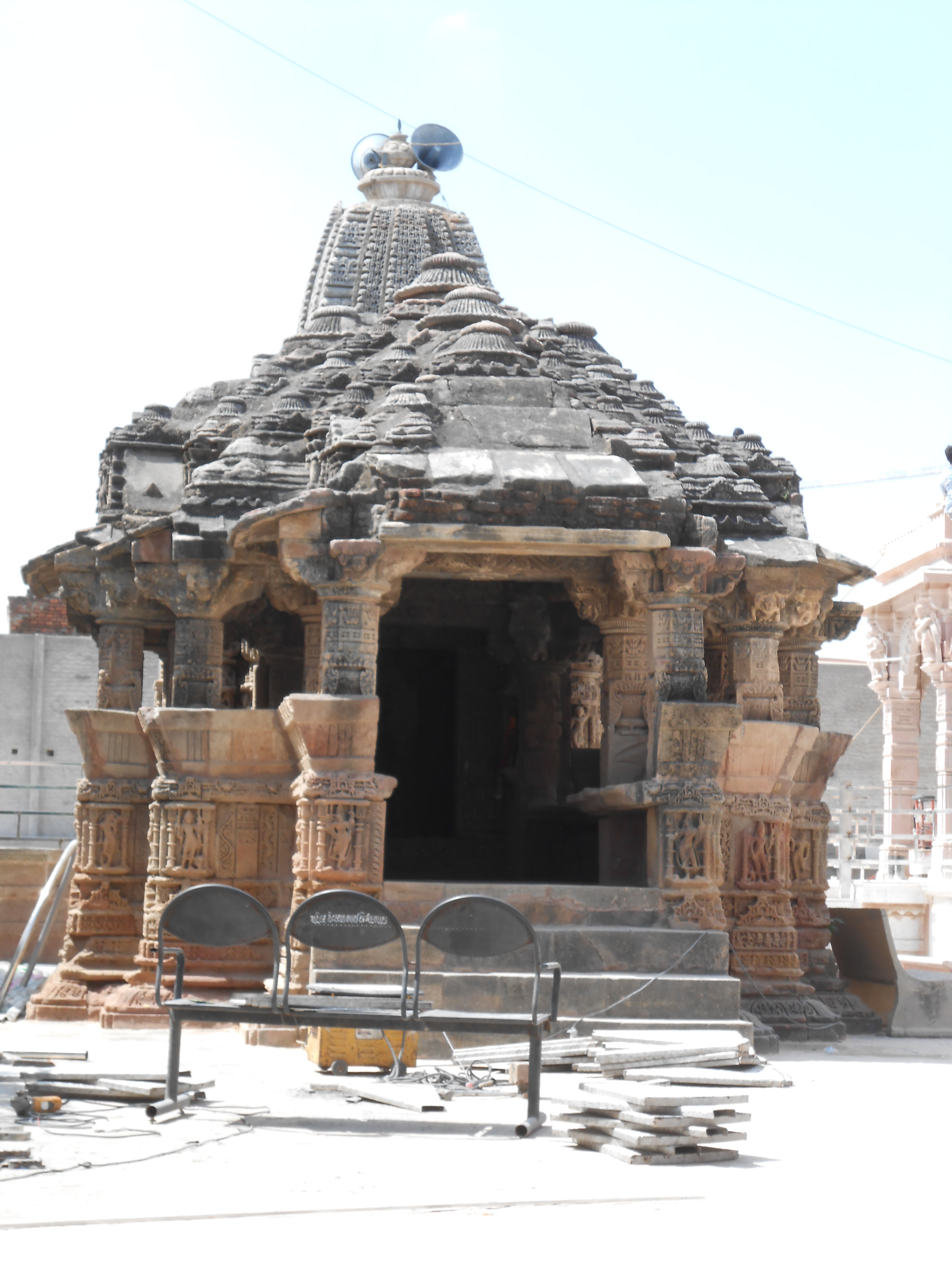
Another temple near Sanderi Mata temple

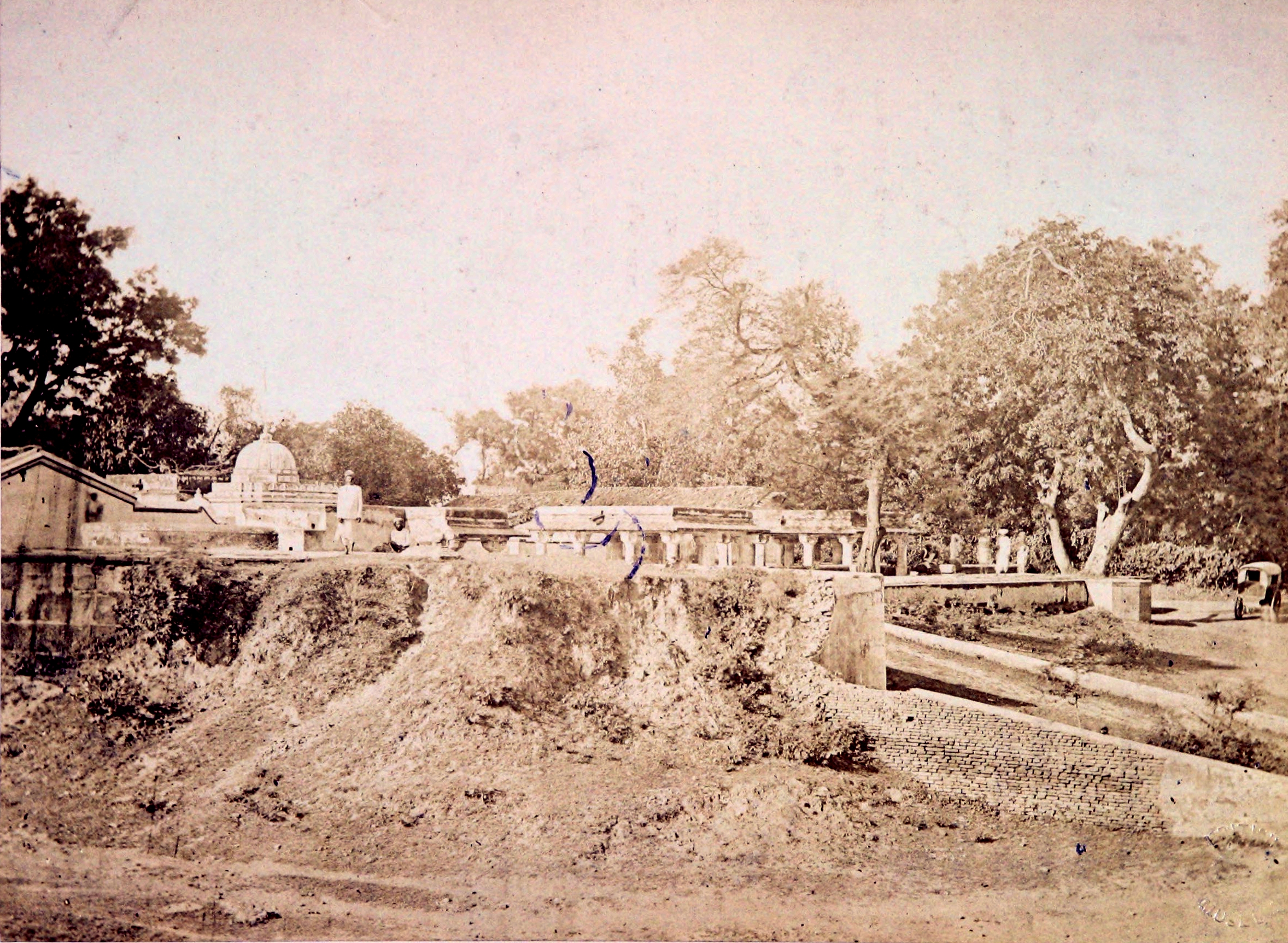
Mata Bhavani's Stepwell, Ahmedabad

Bhima, also known as Bhimadeva, commissioned several religious as well as secular buildings. Merutunga states that he built Tripurushaprasada temple at Anahilapataka (now Patan) for merit of his deceased son. He also built Bhimeshwara and Bhattarika Bhiruani temples. He rebuilt Somnath Temple after its destruction by Ghazni. Merutunga credits Udayamati with excavating a reservoir at Anahilapataka; this tank is said to have been better than the Sahastralinga Tank in the town. According to popular tradition, she also commissioned the Rani ki vav (Queen's stepwell). His minister and later governor of Chandravati, Vimala built Adinath Jain temple, one of the Dilwara Temples, on Mount Abu during the last years of Bhima's reign. He had also built one more temple at Patan and Vimala Vasahi on Shatrunjaya (renovated in the 17th century). The Modhera Sun Temple (1026–27) except its Rangamandapa and tank was reconstructed during Bhima's reign. Bhaktamarastrotra Vritti (1370 CE) and Ratnamandira's Upadeshatarangini (c. 15th century) mentions the construction of Adinatha and Parshwanatha temples by Shreshthi Jhinah at Dhavalakka (Dholka) during this period.

Vagheshwari/Khambhalai Mata temple at Dhinoj in Patan district was built during the same period as Modhera Sun temple. Achaleshwara Mahadev and Jagannatha temples on Mount Abu were contemporary of Adinath temple. Limboji Mata temple at Delmal in north Gujarat is also of the same period. The small shrine of Someshwara at Gorad near Mehsana; Shiva temple and Sanderi Mata temple at Sander in Patan district belongs to the 11th century. A ruined shrine in Mulamadhavpura in Saurashtra is contemporary of Shiva temple at Sander. Pankhnath Mahadev and the early surviving parts of Ambika temples at Khedbrahma are also of this period. The large marble temple of Mahavira (1062 CE), of five Jain temples at Kumbhariya, is the last major temple of this period. The vase-and-foliage pillars and lintels of a temple of this period at Patan is reused in the inlet sluice chamber of Khan Sarovar. The Tanka Mosque in Dholka has four decorated bhadraka pillars reused from a small shrine of this age. The badly renovated Sun temple and another temple dedicated to Daityasudana Vishnu at Prabhas Patan also belongs to this period.

Ankol Mata stepwell at Davad and Mata Bhavani's Stepwell in Ahmedabad belonged to the third quarter of the 11th century.
