= Balaprasada =

King of Naddula from 1055 to 1070

King of Naddula
- Reign: c. 1055–1070 CE
- Predecessor: Anahilla
- Successor: Jendraraja
- Dynasty: Chahamanas of Naddula

Bala-prasada (IAST: Bālaprasāda, r. c. 1055–1070 CE) was an Indian king belonging to the Naddula Chahamana dynasty. He ruled the area around Naddula (present-day Nadol in Rajasthan).

== Reign ==
Balaprasada was the eldest son of his predecessor Anahilla. According to an inscription, he defeated other rulers even as a child. This suggests that he ascended the throne at a young age.

According to the Chahamana records, the Chaulukya king Bhima I had imprisoned another ruler named Krishnadeva; Balaprasada forced Bhima to release Krishnadeva. Historian D. C. Ganguly identified Krishnadeva with Krishnaraja, a ruler of the Paramara branch of Bhinmal. According to historian Dasharatha Sharma, Balaprasada requested (not forced) Bhima release Krishnaraja, which indicates that he accepted Bhima's suzerainty.

Balaprasada appears to have died without issue, as he was succeeded by his younger brother Jendraraja.
