= Prithvipala =

King of Naddula from 1080 to 1090

King of Naddula
- Reign: c. 1080–1090 CE
- Predecessor: Jendraraja
- Successor: Jojalladeva
- Issue: Ratnapala
- Dynasty: Chahamanas of Naddula
- Father: Jendraraja

Prithvi-pala (IAST: Pṛthvīpāla, r. c. 1080–1090 CE) was an Indian king belonging to the Naddula Chahamana dynasty. He ruled the area around Naddula (present-day Nadol in Rajasthan). He achieved military successes against the Chaulukyas, the Paramaras of Vagada, and a Ghaznavid raider.

== Reign ==
Prithvipala was eldest son of the Chahamana king Jendraraja. He succeeded his father on the throne of Naddula.

According to the Sundha Hill inscription, Prithvipala defeated the Gurjara (Chaulukya) king Karna. The Shakambhari Chahamana king Vigraharaja III also claimed to have helped the Paramara king Udayaditya defeat Karna. Historian R. B. Singh theorizes that these three neighbouring kings (Prithvipala, Vigraharaja and Udayaditya) formed an alliance against Karna in order to curb his growing power.

Another Chahamana inscription states that Prithvipala defeated a ruler named Mandalika at Rohadavapika. This ruler can be identified with a ruler of the Paramara branch of Vagada.

The same inscription also states that Prithvipala was once surrounded by a Turushka (Turkic) enemy, and rescued by his younger brother Asharaja. The Turushka enemy can be identified as a Ghaznavid raider, who must have been a subordinate of the Ibrahim of Ghazna.

Prithvipala waived some taxes on the farmers, and may have commissioned an image of a deity known as Prithvipaleshvara.

Prithvipala had a son named Ratnapala, but he was succeeded by his younger brother Jojalladeva. It is possible that Ratnapala was born after Prithvipala's death, or that he was a minor at the time of his father's death. Prithvipala was thus succeeded by his brothers Jojalladeva and Asharaja. Ratnapala gained control of the throne during Asharaja's reign.
