= Shobhita =

King of Naddula from 982 to 986

King of Naddula
- Reign: c. 982–986 CE
- Predecessor: Lakshmana
- Successor: Baliraja
- Dynasty: Chahamanas of Naddula

Shobhita (IAST: Śobhita, r. c. 982–986 CE) was an Indian king belonging to the Naddula Chahamana dynasty. He ruled the area around Naddula (present-day Nadol in Rajasthan), and achieved military successes against the Paramaras of Chandravati.

== Reign ==
Shobhita was a son of his predecessor Lakshmana. He is also known as Sohita or Sohiya.

According to the Sundha Hill inscription, Shobhita "took away the glory of" the lord of Arbuda (Mount Abu). Historian R. B. Singh theorizes that this lord of Arbuda was probably Aranyaraja, a ruler of the Paramara branch of Abu. Dasharatha Sharma identifies him with another Paramara ruler named Dharanivaraha, who had been attacked and defeated by the Chaulukya king Mularaja. Sharma theorizes that Shobhita sided with Mularaja in this conflict.

Shobhita has been described as the lord of Dhara in the Sewari inscription of his descendant Ratnapala. Dhara was the capital of the imperial Paramara dynasty of Malwa. Historian D. C. Ganguly speculated that "Dhara" was a mistake for "Thara", which was a city in the 12th century Mewar region. However, according to Dasharatha Sharma, Shobhita fought against the Paramaras of Malwa, and occupied their capital Dhara. R. B. Singh notes that Shobhita's successor Baliraja is said to have defeated an army of the Paramara monarch Munja. Singh theorizes that Shobhita might have captured Dhara for a brief period, while Munja was busy in his southern campaigns against the Chalukyas of Kalyani.

Shobhita was succeeded by his son Baliraja. A Mount Abu inscription wrongly names Baliraja as the predecessor of Shobhita: this is directly contradicted by other inscriptions of the family.
