= Vigraharaja II =

King of Sapadalaksha
- Reign: c. 971–998 CE
- Predecessor: Simharaja
- Successor: Durlabharaja II
- Dynasty: Chahamanas of Shakambhari

Vigraharāja II (r. c. 971–998 CE) was a king belonging to the Shakambhari Chahamana dynasty. He ruled the Sapadalaksha country, which included parts of present-day Rajasthan in north-western India.

== Early life ==
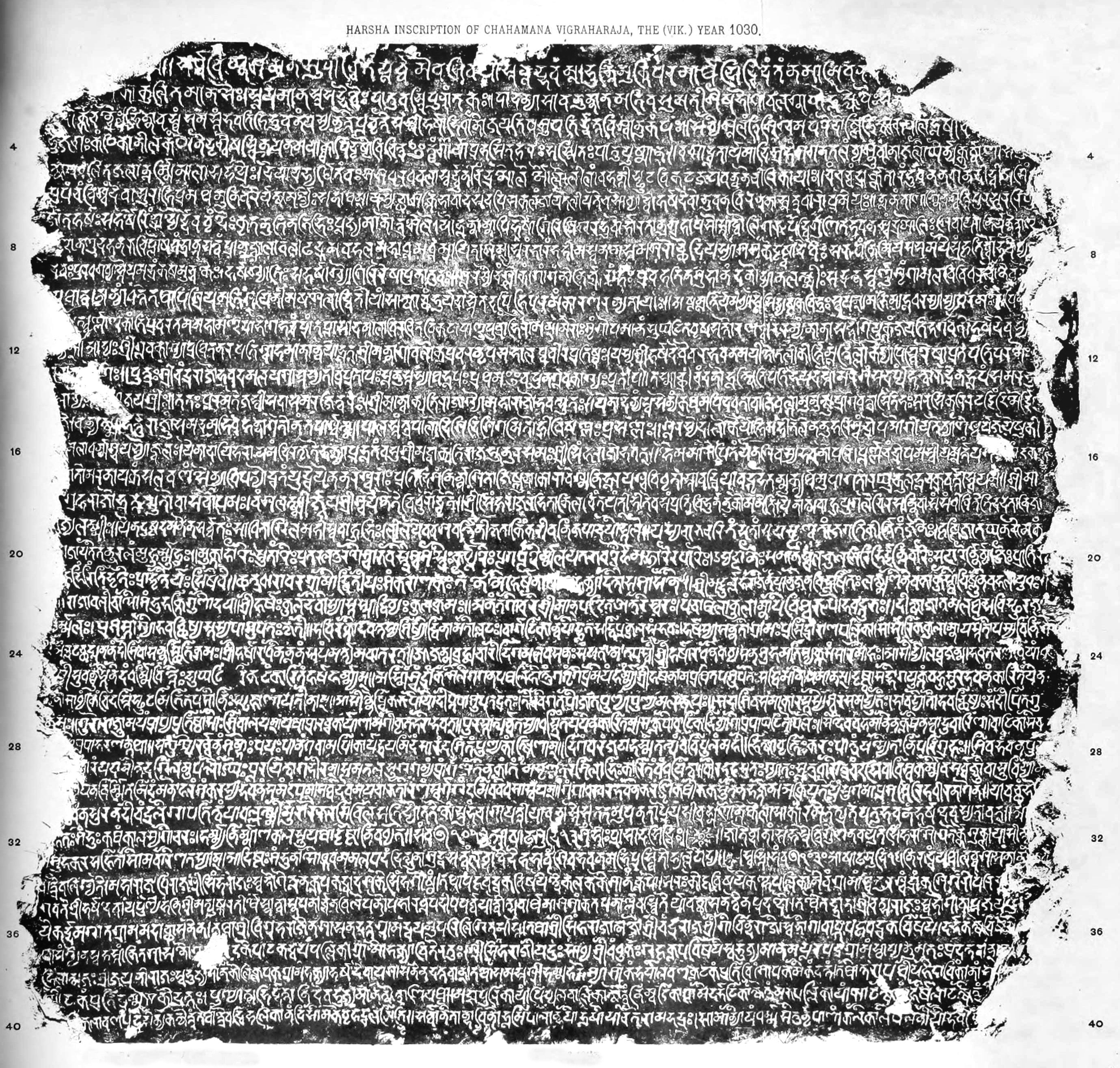
Harsha inscription of the Chahamana Vigraharaja in Vikrama 1030 (973 CE).

Vigrahraja was born to the Chahamana ruler Simharaja. He had three brothers Durlabharaja II (his successor), Chandraraja and Govindaraja. The Chahamanas were originally feudatories to the Gurjara-Pratiharas, but Simharaja had assumed the title Maharajadhiraja taking advantage of their decline. Vigraharaja II was the probably first truly independent king of the Chahamana dynasty.

The 973 CE Harsha inscription issued by Vigraharaja states that he revived the fortunes of his distressed family. It indicates that he achieved several military successes and acquired vassals.

== Military career ==
Prithviraja Vijaya states that Vigraharaja had a large cavalry.

=== Chaulukyas of Gujarat ===
According to the eulogists of Vigraharaja's successors, he defeated Mularaja, the Chaulukya king of Gujarat. As this achievement is not mentioned in the Harsha inscription, Vigraharaja must have defeated Mularaja after 973 CE. The Chahamana chronicle Prithviraja Vijaya, which describes the Chaulukyas of Gujarat as "Gurjaras", states that Mularaja fled to Kantha-durga (modern Kanthkot) during Vigraharaja's invasion. The 15th century Hammira Mahakavya claims that Mularaja was killed in this battle, and Vigraharaja sacked his territory. Another Chahamana chronicle Surjana-Charita also mentions the victory of the Chahamanas over the Gurjaras.

However, the Gujarat-based 14th century poet Merutunga gives a different account of events. According to his Prabandha-Chintamani, Mularaja's kingdom was attacked simultaneously by the neighbouring kingdoms of Sapadalaksha and Tilinga. Sapadalaksha was the Chahamana territory, while Tilanga here refers to the kingdom of the Kalyani Chalukya ruler Tailapa II. This invasion happened at the time of Navratra religious festival. Mularaja moved to the Kantha-durga, and hoped that the Sapadalaksha ruler would return to his capital Shakambhari to worship his family goddess Ashapuri during the festival. When this did not happen, Mularaja visited the Sapadalaksha king's camp unannounced, and asked him not to attack Gujarat while Mularaja was engaged in a war with the Tilanga ruler. The Sapadalaksha ruler agreed to the demand. Mularaja then defeated the Tilanga army led by General Barapa. When the Sapadalaksha ruler learned about this, he fled away from Gujarat.

It is hard to determine the historical truth in these contradictory accounts. According to historian R. B. Singh, Mularaja ceded a part of his territory to the Chahamanas. Dasharatha Sharma also theorized that Vigraharaja had the upper hand in the conflict, as even Merutunga agrees that Mularaja had to take shelter in the Kantha-durga. That said, the Hammira-Mahakavya's claim of Vigraharaja killing Mularaja appears to be inaccurate.

=== Chaulukyas of Lata ===
According to Prithviraja Vijaya, Vigraharaja marched to the region around the Narmada river, and subjugated a king of the lunar dynasty. After his victory, he built a temple dedicated to the goddess Ashapuri at Bhrigukachchha (modern Bharuch), on the banks of Narmada.

At that time, Bhrigukachchha was ruled by the Lata Chalukyas, who were originally feudatories of the Kalyani Chalukyas. So, it appears that Vigraharaja defeated the Lata Chalukya ruler Barapa (or Varappa), who once served as the Kalyani Chalukya general.

According to Dasharatha Sharma, one possibility is that Vigraharaja allied with Barapa to defeat the Gujarat Chaulukya king Mularaja, but this is only a conjecture. Historian R. B. Singh, on the other hand, theorized that after Vigraharaja subjugated Mularaja, the allied army of Vigraharaja and Mularaja attacked Barapa. This theory is based on a narrative in Hemachandra's Dvyashraya Kavya, which was composed under the Gujarat Chaulukya patronage. According to this narrative, Mularaja and his son Chamundaraja marched to Bhrigukachchha, and killed Varappa.

=== Other conflicts ===
According to the 16th century Muslim historian Firishta, in 997 CE, the ruler of Ajmer joined an alliance formed by the ruler of Lahore against the Ghaznavid ruler Sabuktigin. Since Vigraharaja ruled over the present-day Ajmer area at that time, it would appear that he fought against the Ghaznavids. However, the accuracy of Firishta's account is doubtful. Earlier accounts by Muslim historians do not mention any such alliance.

== Legacy ==
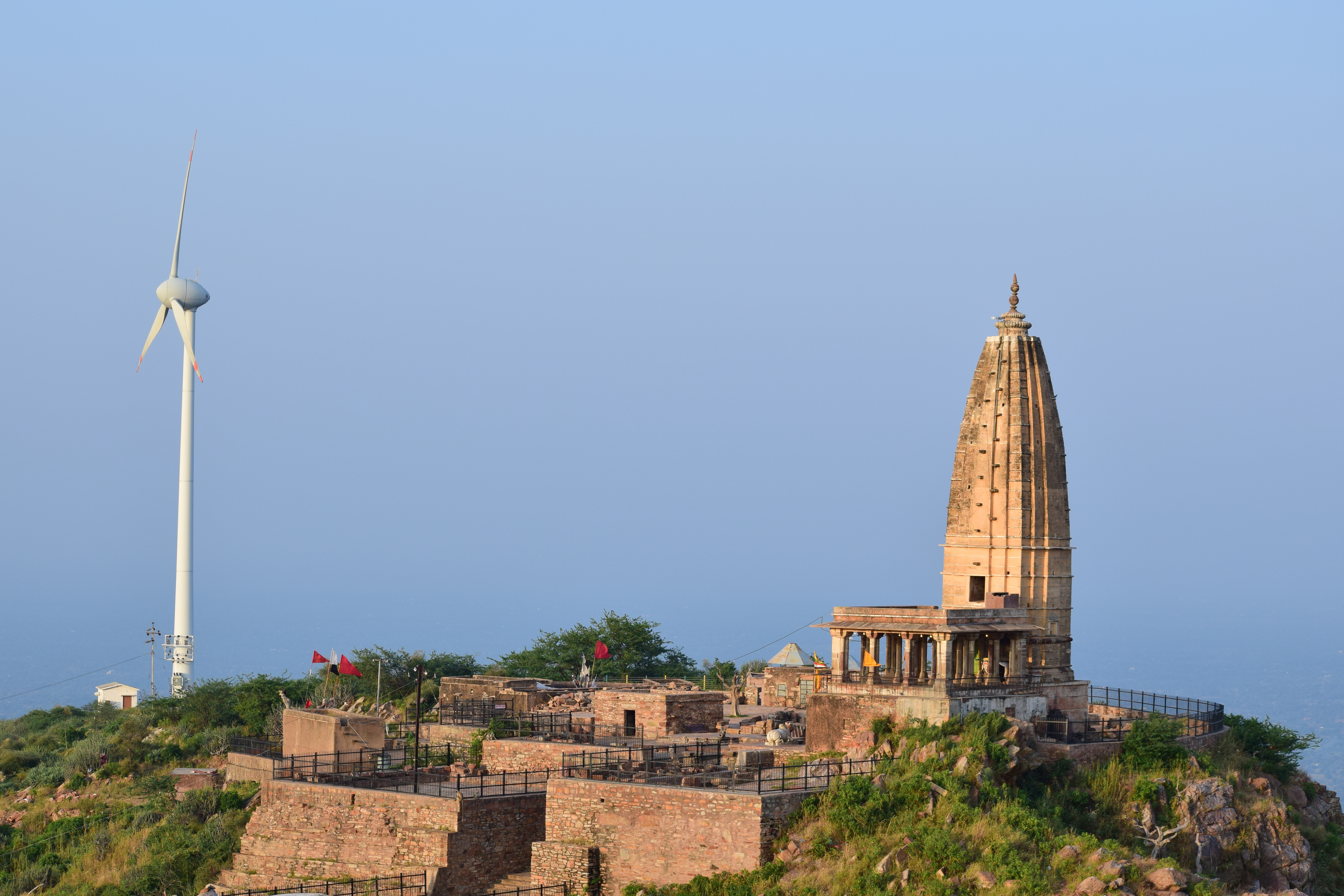
The temple of Harsha-deva

A stone inscription dated to Vigraharaja's reign has been found at Harsha temple. This inscription records the grant of two villages by the king for maintaining the temple dedicated to the deity Harsha-deva. The villages were named Chhatrachara and Shankaranka.

Vigraharaja was succeeded by his brother Durlabharaja II. The Harsha inscription compares them to Rama-Lakshmana and Krishna-Balarama.
