= Vigrahapala (Chahamana dynasty) =

King of Naddula from 990 to 994

King of Naddula
- Reign: c. 990–994 CE
- Predecessor: Baliraja
- Successor: Mahindu
- Dynasty: Chahamanas of Naddula
- Father: Lakshmana

Vigraha-pāla (r. c. 990–994 CE) was an Indian king belonging to the Naddula Chahamana dynasty. He ruled the area around Naddula (present-day Nadol in Rajasthan).

== Reign ==
Vigrahapala was a son of the Chahamana monarch Lakshmana. His brother Shobhita and then his nephew Baliraja succeeded Lakshmana. Baliraja probably died heirless, because of which Vigrahapala became the new king.

Vigraharaja's short reign appears to have passed without any significant event. the Sundha Hill inscription omits his name among the list of Chahamana kings. However, he is attested as a ruler by other inscriptions, including the Mandore inscription of Sahajapala, the Nadol inscription of Kirtipala, and the Nadol inscription of Alhanadeva.

He was succeeded by his son Mahindu.
