= Jendraraja =

King of Naddula from 1070 to 1080

King of Naddula
- Reign: c. 1070–1080 CE
- Predecessor: Balaprasada
- Successor: Prithvipala
- Dynasty: Chahamanas of Naddula

Jendraraja (IAST: Jendrarāja, r. c. 1070–1080 CE) was an Indian king belonging to the Naddula Chahamana dynasty. He ruled the area around Naddula (present-day Nadol in Rajasthan), and achieved military successes against the Chaulukyas.

== Reign ==
Jendraraja was the younger son of the Chahamana king Anahilla. His predecessor was his elder brother Balaprasada, who appears to have died heirless. Jendraraja was also known as Jenduraja, Jindraraja, Jendrapala, Jesaladeva and Jayasaladeva.

According to the Sundha Hill inscription, Jendraraja defeated several of his enemies at Sandera, which can be identified with modern Sanderao. Historian Dasharatha Sharma believes that the leader of the defeated army was the Chaulukya king Bhima I. R. B. Singh believes him to be Bhima's successor Karna.

Jendraraja is said to have been a proficient in polity (neeti). An inscription of his descendant Rajyapala mentions a temple named Jendrarajeshvara in Nadol. This temple was probably commissioned by Jendraraja.

Jendraraja had three sons: Prithvipala, Jojalladeva, and Ashvaraja. These three sons succeeded him one after another.
