= Ashvapala =

King of Naddula from 1015 to 1019

King of Naddula
- Reign: c. 1015–1019 CE
- Predecessor: Mahindu
- Successor: Ahila
- Dynasty: Chahamanas of Naddula
- Father: Mahindu

Ashvapala (IAST: Aśvapāla, r. c. 1015–1019 CE) was an Indian king belonging to the Naddula Chahamana dynasty. He ruled the area around Naddula (present-day Nadol in Rajasthan).

== Reign ==
Ashvapala was the son of his predecessor Mahindu (also known as Mahendra). He had a brother named Anahilla.

Ashvapala's reign seems to have been peaceful. He was succeeded by his son Ahila, who appears to have died heirless. Ashvapala's brother Anahilla then ascended the throne of Naddula. The Nadol inscriptions of Alhana and prince Kirtipala omit Ashvapala's name from the genealogy of the Naddula Chahamana kings, presumably because they were not his descendants.
