= Durlabharaja =

Durlabharaja may refer to:

- Durlabharaja I (r. c. 784-809 CE), Shakambhari Chahamana king of India
- Durlabharaja II (r. c. 998-1012 CE), Shakambhari Chahamana king of India
- Durlabharaja (Chaulukya dynasty) (r. c. 1008–1022), Chaulukya (Solanki) king of India
- Durlabharaja III (r. c. 1065-1070 CE), Shakambhari Chahamana king of India
