= Vigrahapala =

Vigrahapala may refer to:

- Vigrahapala (Chahamana dynasty), 10th century Chahamana ruler of north-western India
- Vigrahapala I, 9th century Pala ruler of eastern India
- Vigrahapala II, 10th century Pala ruler of eastern India
- Vigrahapala III, 11th century Pala ruler of eastern India
