= Ahila =

King of Naddula from 1019 to 1024

King of Naddula
- Reign: c. 1019–1024 CE
- Predecessor: Ashvapala
- Successor: Anahilla
- Dynasty: Chahamanas of Naddula
- Father: Ashvapala

Ahila (r. c. 1019–1024 CE) was an Indian king belonging to the Naddula Chahamana dynasty. He ruled the area around Naddula (present-day Nadol in Rajasthan). He defeated the Chaulukya invader Bhima I.

== Reign ==
Ahila was the son of his predecessor Ashvapala. According to the Chahamana records, he defeated the Chaulukya king Bhima I. The Chaulukya records do not mention this defeat. Historian Dasharatha Sharma theorizes that Bhima invaded the Naddula kingdom to expand his territory, but was forced to retreat.

Ahila appears to have died heirless, probably at a young age, as he was succeeded by his paternal uncle Anahilla. The Nadol inscriptions of Alhana and prince Kirtipala omit Ahila's name from the genealogy of the Naddula Chahamana kings, presumably because they were not his descendants.
