= Dhananjay =

Dhanangay, Dhanangaya, or Dhanunjaya may refer to:

- Dhananjaya, another name of Arjuna, a hero of the ancient Indian epic Mahabharata
- Dhananjaya, a 10th-century Indian drama theorist and the author of Dasharupakam
- Dhananjay (actor) (born 1985), Indian actor
- Dhananjaya (gotra), a sub-caste of the Raju in India
- Dhananjay (film), a 2017 Indian Bengali-language drama film directed by Arindam Sil
- Dhananjay Mahadik, Indian politician
- Dhananjay Mahadik (field hockey), Indian field hockey player
- Dhananjay Mane, a fictional character in the 1988 Indian Marathi-language film Ashi Hi Banwa Banwi
- Dhananjay (politician), Indian politician from Bihar

== See also ==
- Dhananjayan
