= Eklahare =

- Census town
- Location in Maharashtra, India
- Coordinates: 19.9915°N 73.9091°E
- Country: India
- State: Maharashtra
- District: Nashik

Population (2001)
  - Total: 12,010

Languages
  - Official: Marathi
- Time zone: UTC+5:30 (IST)
- Telephone code: 0253
- Vehicle registration: MH 15

Eklahare is a census town in Nashik district in the state of Maharashtra, India.

== Demographics ==
As of 2001 India census, Eklahare had a population of 12,010. Males constitute 52% of the population and females 48%. Eklahare has an average literacy rate of 76%, higher than the national average of 59.5%: male literacy is 83%, and female literacy is 67%. In Eklahare, 10% of the population is under 6 years of age.

== Thermal power station ==
Eklahare houses the Nashik Thermal Power Station (NTPS). There is also the NTPS colony for the employees at the station. The thermal power station has rated capacity of 630 MW and has 3 units of 210 MW each. It uses a coal-fired boiler to produce steam for power generation.

== Shaktiman ==
Shaktiman is a scrap metal sculpture built by NTPS intended to be a symbol of visionary resourcefulness. It weighs 27 tonnes, is 17 metres tall, and is in the Guinness Book of Records. It is meant to stand as a symbol of innovative idea in word and spirit, inspiring visitors that wealth from waste can be a reality. Sculptor Dr. Sudhir Deshpande created it in 1990. He started it in 1989 and finished in 8 months.

== Transport ==
Eklahare is well connected to Nashik and Nashik Road Railway station by the buses of NTPS and City bus service of nashik. Hardly 6 km from Nashik road Railway station, accessible from the Jail Road area also only 3 km.
