= Vakpati Munja =

- Prithvi-Vallabha; Amoghavarsha; Sri-Vallabha; Vakpati-raja-deva; Parama-Bhattaraka; Utpala-Raja; Maharajadhiraja; Parameshvara

King of Malwa
- Reign: c. 972 CE - 990s CE
- Predecessor: Siyaka
- Successor: Sindhuraja
- Pradhan: Kaṇhapaika; Rudraditya
- Died: 994-998 CE; Deccan (Western Chalukya kingdom)
- Spouse: Kusumavati (according to Rajavallabha's Bhojacharitra)
- Issue: Chandana (speculated by K.N. Seth)
Names
- Vakpati Munja Parmar
Regnal name
- Vakpati II
- Dynasty: Paramara
- Father: Siyaka
- Mother: Vadaja
- Religion: Hinduism

Munja (reigned c. 972-990s CE), also known as Vakpati II, was an Indian ruler from the Paramara dynasty, who ruled the Kingdom of Malwa. He is known for consolidating the Malwa kingdom, for patronising poets and scholars and for achieving the military success against almost all of the neighbouring kingdoms.

Munja achieved military successes against the Chahamanas, the Guhilas, the Hunas, the Kalachuris, and the ruler of Gurjara region (possibly a Chaulukya or Pratihara ruler). He also achieved some early successes against the Western Chalukya king Tailapa II, but was ultimately defeated and killed by Tailapa some time between 994 CE and 998 CE.

== Early life ==
Munja succeeded Siyaka as the Paramara king, ascending the throne around 972 CE. According to Prabandha-Chintamani by the 14th century writer Merutunga, Munja was an adopted child of the king Simhadantabhatta (Siyaka). The king discovered him in a munja grassland. Since the king did not have any children of his own at that time, he adopted the child and named him Munja. Although the king later had a biological son named Sindhuraja, he appointed Munja as his successor. Historians doubt the authenticity of this legend, in absence of any supporting evidence. Another later poet Ballala states that Munja and Sindhuraja were biological brothers.

Munja is also known as "Vakpati" (Master of speech), Vakpati-raja, Vakpati-raja-deva, and Utpala-raja. In addition, he assumed the titles Amoghavarsha, Sri-vallabha and Prithvi-vallabha, which were used by the Rashtrakuta kings. This was probably meant to commemorate his predecessor Siyaka's victory over the Rashtrakuta king Khottiga.

== Military career ==
At the time of Munja's ascension, the Paramara kingdom was surrounded by Chahamanas of Shakambari, the Chahamanas of Naddula and the Guhilas of Medapata in the north; the Kalachuris of Chedi and the Chandelas in the east; the Chalukyas of Kalyani in the south; and the Chaulukyas of Gujarat in the west. Except the Chalukyas of Kalyani, Munja successfully dealt with his neighbours. Tilaka-Manjari, a work composed by Munja's court poet Dhanapala eulogizes him as an archer hero. Even the Kauthem inscription of the family of Munja's arch-rival Tailapa II mentions his bravery in wars against the Hunas, the Maravas (people of Marwar), and the Chedis (the Kalachuris).

Early during his reign, Munja defeated the elephant forces of the Guhilas, and plundered their capital Aghata (present-day Ahar in Udaipur). The defeated Guhila ruler (either Naravahana or his son Shaktikumara) took shelter with Dhavala, the Rashtrakuta ruler of Hastikundi. Munja's success is corroborated by the Bijapur inscription of Dhavala, which states that Munja "destroyed" Aghata, forcing the Guhila king to flee the battlefield and seek Dhavala's protection. As a result of this victory, the Paramaras gained control of the eastern part of Mewar, including Chittorgarh.

Munja also defeated the ruler of Gurjara, an ally of the Guhilas. The Bijapur inscription of Dhavala states that the armies of the defeated ruler were left without a leader, and sought asylum with him. Kshemendra's Auchitya-vichara-charcha alludes to the miserable condition of the Gurjara king. According to historians D C Ganguly and Dasharatha Sharma, the defeated king was Mularaja, the Chaulukya king of Gujarat. On the other hand, historians Pratipal Bhatia, K. N. Seth and K. C. Jain believe that he was the Pratihara ruler Vijayapala (r. 954-989 CE). According to Bhatia, Munja conquered Ujjain from the Pratiharas. Jain, however, states that Ujjain must have been conquered by his father Siyaka II since Munja issued land grants from Ujjain in 973 CE, just one year after his ascension.

The Paramara conquest of eastern Mewar brought them closer to the Chahamanas of Naddula (Chauhans of Nadol), who ruled the Marwar region, resulting in a conflict between the two kingdoms. Three Chahamana rulers Shobhita, Baliraja and Vigrahapala died within a period of 14 years, while Munja remained the Paramara king. K. C. Jain speculates that these deaths might have resulted from the Chahamana-Paramara conflict. The Paramara court poet Padmagupta states that the Munja "caused the pearls in the necklaces worn by the women of Marwar to dance". At the same time, the Sevadi copper plates of the later Chahamana ruler Ratnapala call Shobhita as the Lord of Dhara (the Paramara capital). Baliraja's records also claim that he defeated Munja's army. K. C. Jain theorizes that the Chahamanas achieved successes in early part of the struggle, but were ultimately pushed back by Munja.

Like his father Siyaka II, Vakpati also fought against the Hunas. The Gaonri plate issued by him in 981 CE records the grant of Vanika village in Huna-mandala to Brahmins. Vakpati's victory over Hunas does not appear to be decisive, because his successor Sindhuraja also had to fight against the Hunas.

According to the Udaipur Prashasti inscription of his descendant Udayaditya, Munja also defeated Yuvaraja II, the Kalachuri ruler of Tripuri. This claim is corroborated by the Kauthem grant inscription of Vikramaditya V, which states that "Utpala destroyed the power of the Chaidyas, the king of Chedis". However, this victory did not result in any territorial gains for the Paramaras.

The Udaipur Prashasti further claims that he subdued the Cholas and the Keralas. However, this seems to be hyperbolic praise, as the Chola and the Kerala kingdoms lay to the south of the Western Chalukya (Karnata) kingdom. According to K. C. Jain, it is possible that the Cholas and the Keralas sought his help against mutual enemies.

== War with Tailapa and death ==
Munja was a staunch rival of the Western Chalukya king Tailapa II, whose Karnata kingdom lay to the south of the Paramara kingdom. Tailapa considered himself as the successor of the Rashtrakutas, and therefore, wanted to control Malwa. The Udaipur Prashasti inscription states that Munja attacked Lata (present-day Gujarat), and defeated the Chalukya ruler of that area. According to one theory, the defeated ruler was Tailapa's Lata Chalukya vassal Barappa or his son Goggiraja. According to another theory, "Chalukya" here refers to the Chaulukyas of present-day Gujarat, and Munja fought with their king Mularaja.

The war between Munja and Tailapa has been described by Merutunga, whose account is based on a now-lost Apabhramsa poem called Munja-rasa. According to Merutunga, Tailapa harassed Munja by carrying out several raids into his kingdom, and Munja defeated Tailapa six times (sixteen times, according to some manuscripts). The Udaipur Prashasti also states that he defeated Tailapa. Despite these early successes, he could not subdue Tailapa. Against the advice of his prime minister Rudraditya, Munja decided to adopt a more aggressive policy and crossed the Godavari River in a campaign against Tailapa. Merutunga states that the minister foresaw Munja's defeat and committed suicide by jumping into a fire. In the ensuing conflict, Tailapa defeated Munja's army by force and fraud, and imprisoned him. In his victory against Munja, Tailapa appears to have been aided by his Yadava vassal Bhillama II. Bhillama's 1000 Sangamner inscription poetically boasts that he thrashed the goddess of prosperity Lakshmi on the battlefield because she had sided with Munja, and forced her to become an obedient housewife in the palace of Tailapa.

According to Merutunga, during his imprisonment, Munja and Tailapa's widowed sister Mrinalavati fell in love. Meanwhile, Munja's ministers entered Tailapa's kingdom in disguise, and managed to get in touch with Munja. They made a rescue plan, which Munja divulged to Mrinalavati, because he wanted to take her to Malwa. Mrinalavati told her brother about Munja's escape plan. As a result, Tailapa humiliated Munja by forcing him to beg door-to-door, and then had him executed.

While Merutunga's account may not be entirely accurate from a historical point of view, there is little doubt that Munja died in Deccan, as a result of his war against Tailapa. Ballala claims that Munja died a peaceful death after appointing Bhoja as his successor. However, this is not historically accurate. Munja was succeeded by his brother Sindhuraja. Moreover, his defeat and death at the hands of Tailapa is supported by the inscriptions of Tailapa's descendants. The Kauthem grant inscription of Vikramaditya V states that Tailapa imprisoned Utpala (another name for Munja). The Gadag inscription of Vikramaditya VI states that Munja was killed by Tailapa. The Ain-i-Akbari also states that Munja died in Deccan.

The exact year of Munja's death is not certain. Subhashita-Ratna-Sandoha by the Jain writer Amitagati states that it was completed in 994 CE (1050 VS), when Munja was reigning at Dhara. Tailapa died in 998 CE. Therefore, Munja must have died between 994 and 998 CE.

As a result of his victory against Munja, Tailapa conquered the southern part of the Paramara kingdom, possibly up to the Narmada River.

=== Successors ===
According to Merutunga's Prabandha-Chintamani, Munja's successor was his nephew Bhoja. However, according to Nava-sahasanka-charita and epigraphic evidence, Munja was succeeded by his brother (and Bhoja's father) Sindhuraja.

Merutunga mentions a legend about Munja's attempt to kill a young Bhoja. The legend is also repeated by Ballala with some variations. It states that an astrologer predicted the future greatness of Bhoja as a king. According to Merutunga's version, Munja wanted his own son to become the king. According to Ballala's account, Munja did not want Bhoja to surpass his glory. Both accounts state that the person ordered to carry out the execution faked the killing. Before his faked death, Bhoja wrote a message for Munja, upon reading which Munja felt great remorse. When he came learned that Bhoja was still alive, Munja appointed him as his heir. This legend is considered of spurious nature by the historians. Munja's court poet Dhanapala states that the king had great love for Bhoja. Merutunga and Ballala are later writers, and their accounts are not historically reliable. Moreover, historical evidence indicates that Munja's successor was Sindhuraja, not Bhoja.

The contemporary writers Padmagupta and Dhanapala state that Munja died childless. Merutunga states that the king had one son. Ballala states that he had multiple sons. D. C. Ganguly theorized that Munja had two sons, Aranyaraja and Chandana; he appointed these as the administrators of Abu and Jalor. A Paramara branch at Jalor is known to have been founded by one Vakpati-raja. According to K. N. Seth, this person is same as the Vakpati Munja. Seth speculates that Munja had only one son, Chandana, whom he appointed as the ruler of Jalor. Pratipala Bhatia rejects these theories, stating that Aranyaraja lived two generations before Munja, and there is no concrete evidence about Chandana being Munja's son either. The fact that Munja was succeeded by his brother Sindhuraja also indicates that he died without any heir. Another possibility is that Munja did not expect to die in his expedition against the Chalukyas. Therefore, he left the administration in hands of his brother Sindhuraja temporarily. His unexpected death left Sindhuraja as the king, and then the throne passed on to Sindhuraja's son Bhoja.

== Cultural and welfare activities ==
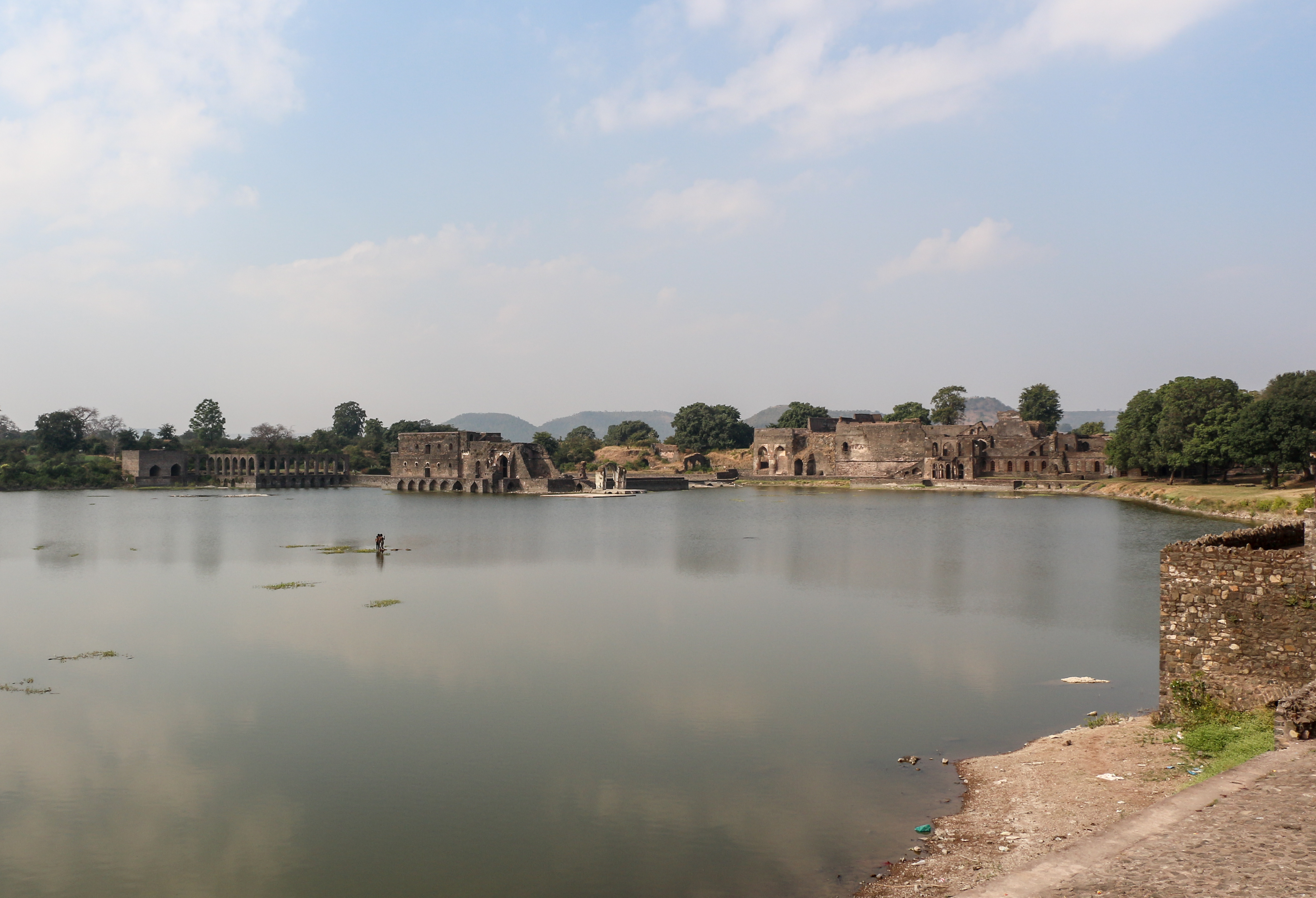
Munja Talao or Munj Talab, a pond in Mandu

Munja dug several tanks and erected many temples. He commissioned several buildings in his capital Dhara. He is believed to have excavated the Munja-sagara (Munj Sagar) lake in Dhara and the Munja-talao tank in Mandu. Munja also built temples and ghats (embankments) in Dharmapuri, Maheshvara, Omkara-Mandhata and Ujjayani. Munjapura, a former town in present-day Gujarat, was named after him.

Munja was renowned as a great patron of art and literature. His royal patronage attracted scholars from many parts of India. The poets patronized by him included Dhananjaya, Bhatta Halayudha, Shobhana Dhanika, Padmagupta and Amitagati. His grant to Vasantacharya, a philosopher from Ahichchhatra, is recorded in his Dharampuri inscription. His Gaonri inscriptions record the names of several Brahmins who had migrated to his kingdom from the present-day Bengal, Bihar and Assam in eastern India. Munja also composed poetry himself. Although no complete work composed by him is now available, the Kashmiri poet Kshemendra quotes three stanzas composed by him. The 12th century Jain writer Hemachandra describes Munja among the four learned kings; the other three being the legendary Vikramaditya and Shalivahana, and Munja's nephew Bhoja.

== Inscriptions ==
Find spots of Munja's inscriptions

The following inscriptions of Munja, all written in Sanskrit language and Nagari script, have been discovered.

=== 974–975 Dharampuri copper plates ===
This inscription records a grant, and is the first known Paramara inscription to be issued from outside Gujarat. It is dated 3 September 974 CE (1031 VS), if Chaitra is considered as the first month of the year. The date can alternatively be interpreted as 23 August 975 CE, if Kartika is considered the first month, as was common in some regions. The inscription is inscribed on two copper plates that were found by a farmer in Dharampuri of Dhar district. It was sent to the Central India Agency's Archives Office in Indore, and first translated into English by Fitzedward Hall in 1861.

The two plates contain 18 and 16 lines respectively. The second plate has a part of the sign manual of the king. It also shows the Paramara emblem Garuda in human form, about to strike a snake held in its left hand.

The inscription begins with a siddham symbol, followed by two mangala-shlokas (auspicious verses). The first verse praises the manly throat of Srikantha ("the one with auspicious throat" or Shiva), seeking more happiness. The second verse praises the body of Mura-ripu ("slayer of the Mura demon" or Krishna), requesting him to protect the world.

Next, the inscription mentions the following genealogy of the issuer, stating that each king meditated at the feet of his predecessor:

- Krishna-raja-deva (titled Parama-bhattaraka Maharajadhiraja Parameshvara)
- Vairisimha-deva (titled Parama-bhattaraka Maharajadhiraja Parameshvara)
- Siyaka-deva (titled Parama-bhattaraka Maharajadhiraja Parameshvara)
- Vakpati-raja-deva alias Amoghavarsha-deva (titled Prithvi-vallabha and Sri-vallabha)

The inscription records the grant of a taḍāra (meaning unknown) called Pipparika, which was located on the banks of the Narmada River. K. N. Seth identifies Pipparika with Pipri village near Manawar in Dhar district. The king made the grant while staying at Ujjayani (Ujjain), to increase the merit of his family. The donee was Vasantacharya, a Brahmin philosopher from Ahichchhatra.

The inscription mentions Kaṇhapaika, who is also mentioned in the 969 Ahmedabad copper plate of Munja's predecessor Siyaka, as the dapaka (the officer-in-charge of registering the grants).

=== 980 Ujjain grant ===
This inscription, discovered in Ujjain, was issued in 980 CE (1036 VS). The inscription states that it was issued by Vakpati-raja-deva alias Amoghavarsha, whose title it gives as Parama-bhattaraka Maharajadhiraja Parameshvara.

Like the Dharampuri grant, this inscription also begins with shlokas, followed by Munja's genealogy. The main objective of the inscription is to record the repairs to a temple of the goddess Bhatteshvari (identified with Harsidhhi).

The name of the dapaka is given as Rudraditya, followed by the sign-manual of the king. The inscription states that the king was at Bhagavatpura (identified with Bhagor village), when he made a gift to provide for the worship of the goddess, on 26 October 980, during a lunar eclipse. The charter of the gift was officially issued four months later, on when the king was staying at Gunapura (possibly the modern Gunavad village), after having achieved a great victory.

=== 981-982 Gaonri copper plates ===
This inscription, issued in 981-982 CE (1038 VS), records the grant of a village to Brahmins. It is recorded on three copper plates, which were discovered on 20 June 1931 in Gaonri (or Gaowdi) village near Ujjain. A palimpsest containing a record of the Rashtrakuta king Suvarnavansha (Govinda IV) was found on the outer side of the first copper plate. This record is dated 929-930 CE (851 Saka). S. K. Dikshit speculated that it might have been brought to Malwa by Munja's father Siyaka II, who had sacked the Rashtrakuta capital Manyakheta.

The plates are inscribed on one side only, and contain 23, 20 and 10 lines respectively. Like other Paramara inscriptions, the third plate shows a Garuda in human form, about to strike a snake.

As with other inscriptions, it begins with shlokas and the royal genealogy. Next, the inscription records the grant of the Vanika village in the Avaraka bhoga (subdivision) of Huna-mandala. S. K. Dikshit identifies Vanika and Avaraka as present-day villages of Benka and Awar near Agar. H. V. Trivedi identifies them as Bani and Avra villages near Shamgarh. The donees mentioned in the plates include Brahmins from a variety of gotras and shakha. Apart from Malwa, the Brahmins the came from distant regions such as Magadha, Dakshina (southern) Raḍha, Uttara-Kula, Savathika (possibly Savatthi or Bogra-Dinajpur region), Lata and Madhyadesha.

The grant was made on 16 October 981 CE, on the occasion of a lunar eclipse. The official charter was issued nine months later, on 3 July 982 CE. The inscription mentions the dapaka as Rudraditya, and ends with the royal sign-manual.

=== 986 Gaonri copper plates ===
This inscription, issued in 986 CE (1943 VS), records the grant of a village to a Brahmin. It begins with shlokas dedicated to Srikantha (Shiva) and Mura-ripu (Krishna), followed by the usual royal genealogy. It then states that while residing in Purna-pathaka, the king donated the village of Kadahichchhaka to a Brahmin named Sarvananda, who was the son of Dikshita Lokananda. This donee is also one of the Brahmins mentioned in the earlier Gaonri inscription. The location of Kadahichchhaka is given as Maddhuka-bhukti (province) in Ujjayani vishaya (subdivision) of the Avanti mandala. It is identified with the present-day Kadchha village near Gaonri.

The grant was made on the occasion of winter solstice on 22 December 986 CE. The date of the official charter is given as 31 December 986 CE.

== In popular culture ==
- Prithivivallabh, a 1921 Gujarati historical novel by Kanaiyalal Munshi portrayed life of Vakpati Munja
- Prithvi Vallabh, a 1924 silent film directed by Manilal Joshi
- Prithvi Vallabh, a 1943 Hindi film directed by Sohrab Modi
- Prithvi Vallabh - Itihaas Bhi, Rahasya Bhi, a 2018 Indian TV series aired on Sony Entertainment Television
