= Lakshmana (Chahamana dynasty) =

King of Naddula from 950 to 982

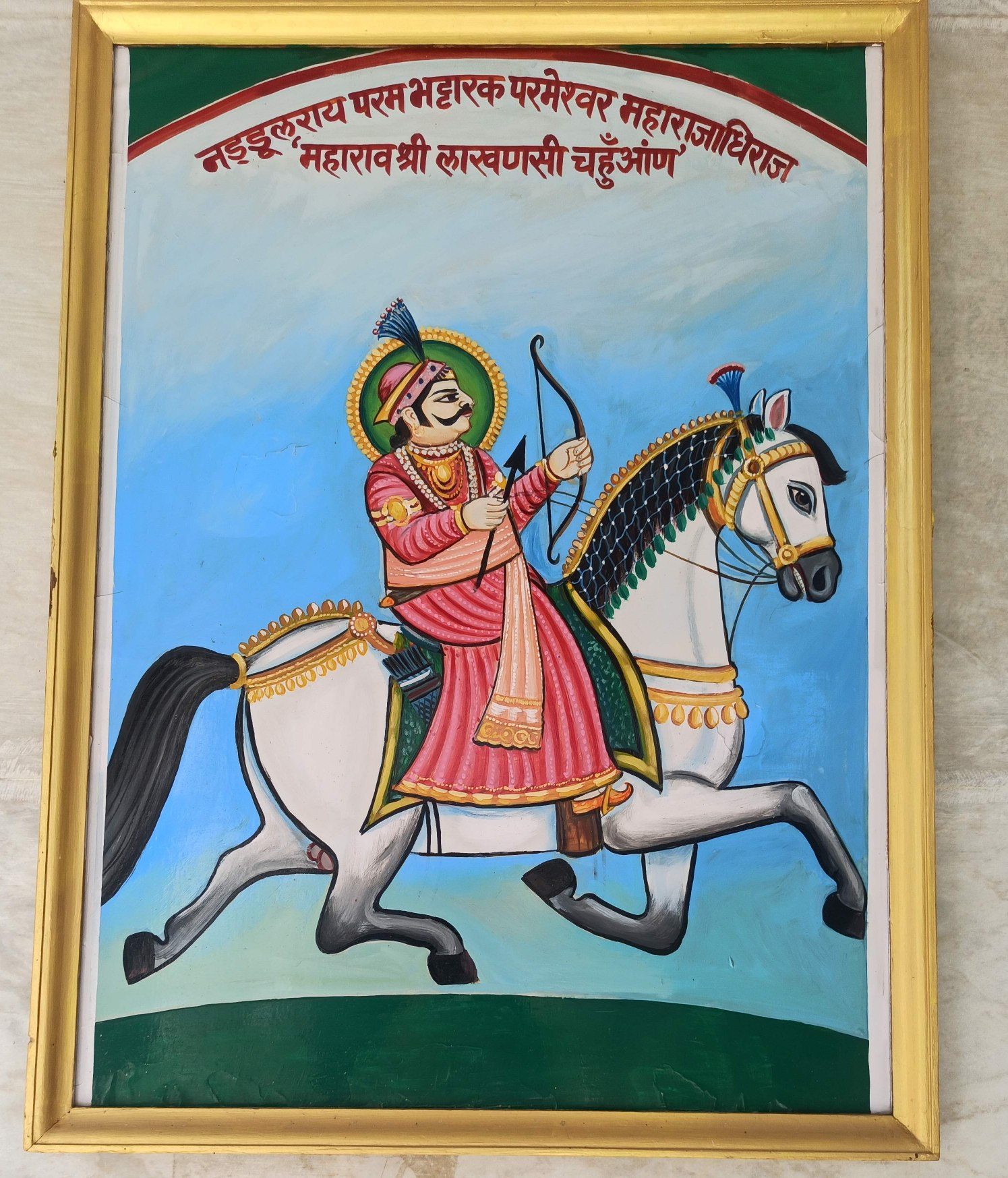
- Lakshmana aka Lakhansi Chauhan

King of Naddula
- Reign: c. 950–982 CE
- Successor: Shobhita
- Dynasty: Chahamanas of Naddula
- Father: Vakpatiraja I

Lakshmana (IAST: Lakṣmaṇa, r. c. 950–982 CE) also known as Raval Lakha or Lakhana was an Indian king who established the Naddula Chahamana dynasty. A son of the Shakambhari Chahamana king Vakpatiraja I, Lakshmana carved out a principality around Naddula (present-day Nadol in Rajasthan).

== Early life ==
In the medieval vernacular literature, Lakshmana is also known as Rao Lakha or Lakhana. He was born to the Shakambhari Chahamana king Vakpatiraja I, who was succeeded by his elder brother Simharaja.

The fact that Lakshmana was a son of Vakpatiraja is known only from the Naddula Chahamana records. The inscriptions of his parent dynasty do not mention him. The 973 CE Harsha stone inscription of the Shakambhari Chahamanas names two of his brothers and four of his nephews, but does not mention him. This might be because he was a rival claimant to the throne, or because he did not have cordial relations with Simharaja for some other reason.

Some later accounts state that Lakshmana's father was Simharaja. These include the 15th century Lakhana Raula Prabandha (a legendary biography of Lakshmana in Puratana Prabandha Sangraha collection), and the Nainsi ri Khyat of the 17th century chronicler Muhnot Nainsi. The Achaleshvara inscription of Luntigadeva names his father as Sindhuraja. However, these records can be ignored as inaccurate, as the earliest inscriptions clearly describe Lakshmana as a son of Vakpatiraja.

The Lakhana Raula Prabandha states that he left home on an indefinite journey. He was accompanied only by his wife and his servant. He stopped at a temple in Naddula to take rest during the journey, and decided to stay there. The legend suggests that Lakshmana was forced to quit his home, as he had no royal support during the journey.

== Reign ==
The Lakhana Raula Prabandha claims that Lakshmana single-handedly fought against the freebooters called the Medas, who had been raiding the Naddula area. This impressed the local Brahmanas, who hired him to guard the town. Gradually, Lakshmana built a small troop, and forced Medas to stay away from Naddula. One day, he ventured too far into Medapata (the Meda territory), while pursuing the Medas. He was seriously wounded in a fight against Medas, and felt helpless. But his family deity Ashapura appeared before him, and told him that a large number of horses belonging to the Malwa king would come to him. She instructed him to sprinkle saffron water on the horses. The next day, a convoy of 12,000 horses passed by Lakshmana. When he sprinkled the saffron water on them, their colour changed so drastically that the men accompanying the horses failed to recognize them. Thus, Lakshmana became the owner of these 12,000 horses. With help of these horses, Lakshmana was able to carve out a kingdom for himself. Nainsi ri Khyat contains a similar account, but states the number of horses as 13,000. These legends suggest that Lakshmana had a strong cavalry.

According to the Chahamana records, Lakshmana collected taxes from the gates of Patana, and levied tribute on Chittor. Historians such as G. H. Ojha and Dasharatha Sharma consider this to be an empty boast, as these two cities were ruled by independent rulers at the time. Patana was the capital of the Chaulukya king Mularaja, while Chittor was under the control of Guhila rulers Shaktikumara and Ambaprasada.

The construction of the Nadol Fort is attributed to Lakshmana. He is also said to have commissioned a Vishnu temple named after him at Nadol (possibly the Lakshmana-svamin temple mentioned in later 12th century inscriptions).

Lakshmana is said to have married a Vaishya woman in Naddula. He was succeeded by his son Shobhita alias Sohiya.
