= Dhananjayan =

Dhananjayan may refer to:

- G. Dhananjayan, an Indian film producer in Tamil cinema
- Dhananjayan Sriskandarajah, the Secretary General of CIVICUS: World Alliance for Citizen Participation
- Vannadil Pudiyaveettil Dhananjayan and Shanta Dhananjayan, an Indian dancing couple known as the Dhananjayans

== See also ==
- Dhananjay (disambiguation)
