= Dharampuri =

- Town
- Location in Madhya Pradesh, India Dharampuri (India)
- Coordinates: 22.17°N 75.35°E
- Country: India
- State: Madhya Pradesh
- District: Dhar
- Elevation: 139 m (456 ft)

Population (2011)
  - Total: 16,363

Languages
  - Official: Hindi
- Time zone: UTC+5:30 (IST)
- Postal code: 454449
- ISO 3166 code: IN-MP
- Vehicle registration: MP-11

Dharampuri is a town and headquarters of a tehsil in Dhar district in the state of Madhya Pradesh, India. It is situated on banks of river Narmada. It is a place of some historical and archaeological interest.

== Geography ==
Dharampuri is located at 22.17°N 75.35°E, on the north bank of the Narmada River. It has an average elevation of 139 metres (456 feet).

== History ==
Of historical importance is a copper-plate charter issued in V.S. 1031 (975 A.D.) by the Paramara king Vakpati Munja, which were reportedly dug out by a farmer in his field at Dharampuri. It records the gift of tax-free land to a Brahmin philosopher named Vasantacharya, son of Pandita Dhanika, who had migrated from Ahicchatra to Malwa. The continued religious importance of the town into the Sultanate period is attested by the Tal Masjid, which preserves an inscription recording its construction by Shaikh Idrak in 910 H. (1504-05 A.D.).

== Demographics ==
As of 2001 India census, Dharampuri had a population of 13,229. Males constitute 51% of the population and females 49%. Dharampuri has an average literacy rate of 62%, higher than the national average of 59.5%: male literacy is 70% and, female literacy is 53%. In Dharampuri, 16% of the population is under 6 years of age.

== Important places ==
=== Bilwamriteshwar Mahadev Temple ===
It is situated on island between two streams of river Narmada. It is believed that Maharishi Dadhichi used to worship Lord Shiva here. It is said that this temple is of Ramayan Era. On Mahashivratri large crowd gather here to worship Lord Shiva. The Lord is locally known as Jagirdar Sarkar also.
