= Kanthkot Fort =

Fort in Kutch, Gujarat

Coordinates: 23°29′2″N 70°27′43″E

- Kutch, Gujarat, India
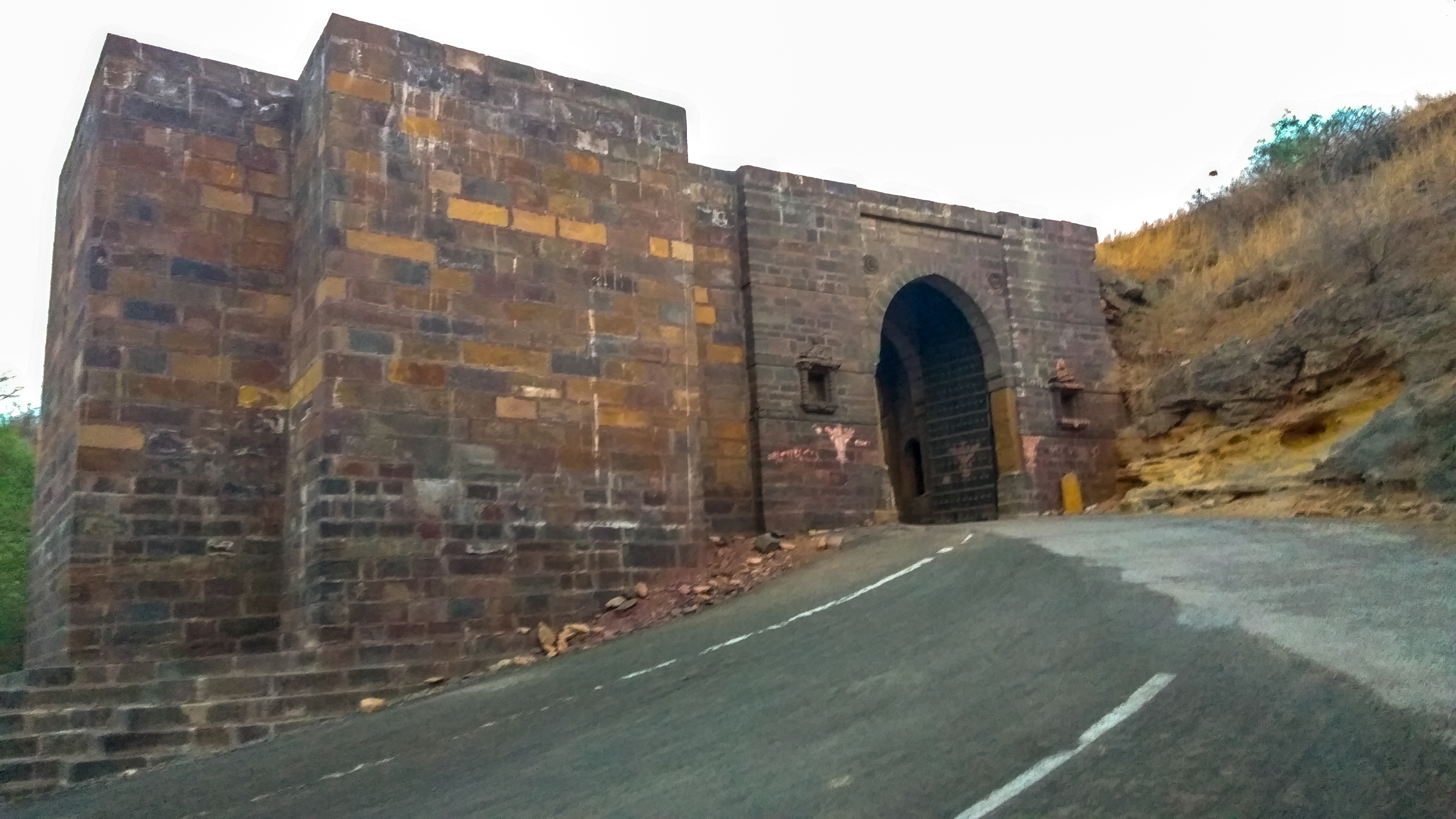
- Kanthkot Fort Gate

Site information
- Type: Fort
- Controlled by: Government of Gujarat
- Condition: Ruins

Site history
- Built: 843 CE
- Built by: Kathis
- Materials: Granite Stones and lime mortar

Kanthkot fort is located near Kanthkot village, Bhachau Taluka of Kutch, Gujarat.

== History ==
Kanthkot is an old fort on the top of an isolated rocky hill about three miles (5 km) in circumference, has walls built of massive blocks repaired in many places by smaller stones. It is said, in the eighth century, to have been the capital of the Kathis and to have been taken from them by the Chavdas.

According to the local story the present fort was begun about 843 (Samvat 900). A part of the wall crossed the fireplace of the great ascetic Kanthadnath, who in anger destroyed it. Then the builders appeasing the ascetic called the fort after his name, and were allowed to finish it. About the middle of the tenth century, under the name Kanthadurg, it appears as the place to which the Chaulukya king Mularaja fled, when pressed (950) by Tailapa II of Kalyani. In the eleventh century (1024) it is believed to be the fort Khandaba, forty parasangas from Somnath and between that place and the desert, where Bhima I sought shelter from Mahmud Ghazni. About the middle of the twelfth century (1143) the Raja of Kanthagam, probably Kanthkot, from the west is mentioned as joining the Nagor chief against Kumarapala of Anhilwad Patan.

In the thirteenth century, it was the capital of the Vaghelas from whom, about the close of the century (1270), it was taken by Mod and Manai Samma. Mod befriended Vaghela who not only gave Kanthkot but also his daughter in marriage to Mod’s son Sad. Sad lived in Kanthkot and made it his capital. Sad’s son Ful named the fort Kanthadurg.

In the beginning of the fifteenth century (1410) it was besieged by Muzaffar Shah (1390-1411). It afterwards passed to the Deda branch of the Jadejas. During the reign of Jadejas, Kanthkot was given as an estate to Dedaji, the second son of Rao Raydhan Ratna. At the close of the sixteenth century is mentioned by Mughal vizier Abu'l-Fazl ibn Mubarak as one of the chief Kutch forts.

In 1816, it surrendered to a British detachment under Colonel East, when the fortifications were razed to the ground before the Cutch State accepted the suzerainty of British in 1819. Although, the Kanthkot remained under Jadeja rulers till independence of India in 1947.

== Architecture ==
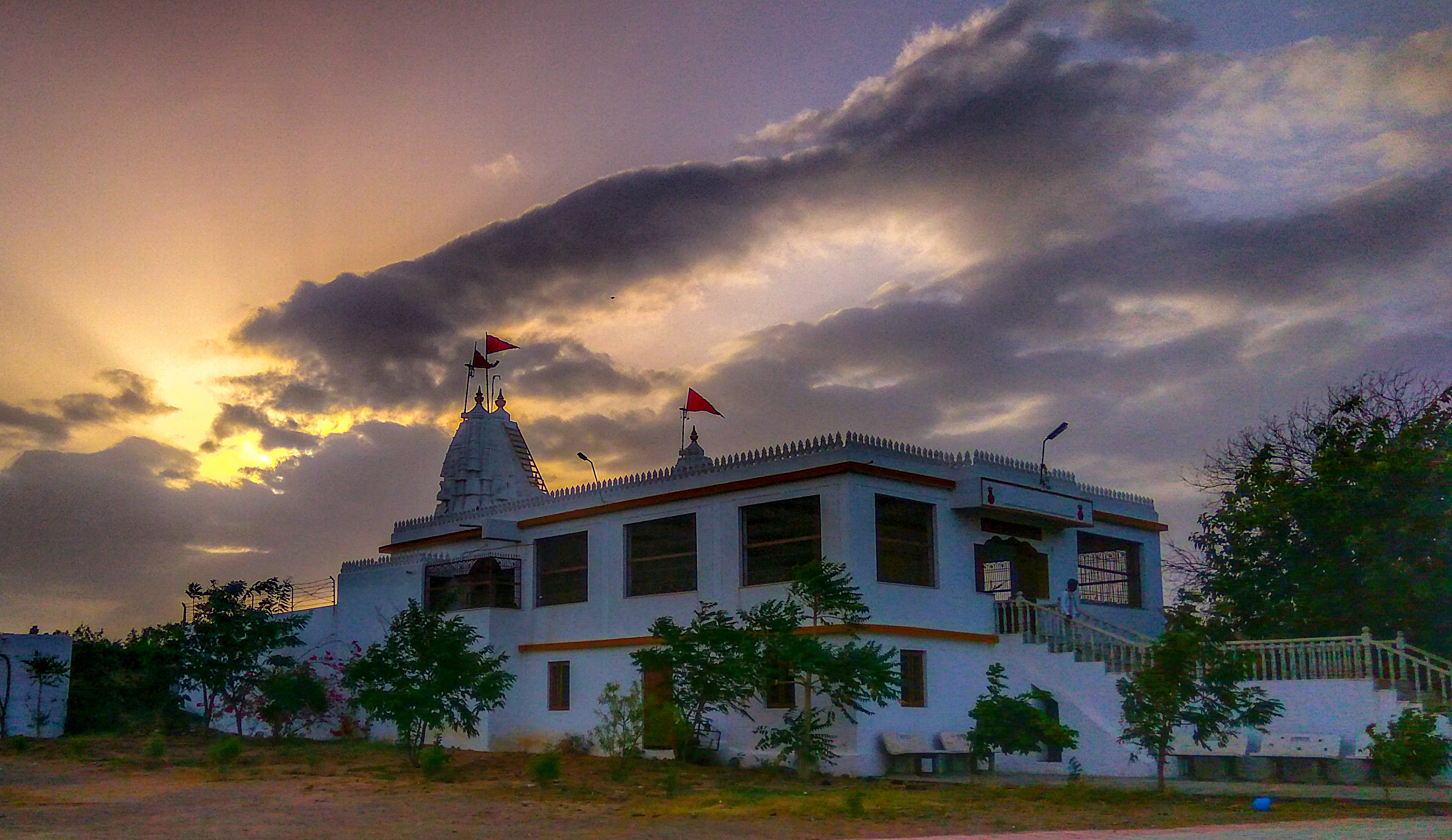
Kanthadnath temple, Kanthkot Fort

In the west of the hill in a ravine are two large deep wells and one ruined stepwell built of blocks of sandstone. Of these wells one called Bhamario is 12 feet in diameter and 76 deep, the other the Nogan well is 18 feet round and 63 deep.

On the hill are the remains of three temples, one to the ascetic Kanthadnath, the second an old Jain temple to Mahavir, the third a temple to the Sun.

Kanthadnath's shrine on the west point of the hill was, about 1820, built by Deda Jadejas in the place of a much larger temple, probably the work of Mod Samma (1270), ruined by the 1819 Rann of Kutch earthquake. The present shrine, built on a high platform, is domed and measures 28 feet by 14 and 28 high. It has a fine domed porch supported on four pillars, and inside a white marble image of Kanthadnath sitting cross-legged.

The much ruined Jain temple of Mahavir has had a double entrance hall, mandap. A writing on a pillar in the entrance hall dated 1283 (Samvat 1340) states that the builders were Atmadevnath's sons, Lakha and Sohi. On a pilaster in the screen on the outside, Atmadev's son Pasil is said to be the builder. The family who built the temple are believed to be relatives of Jagdusha of Bhadresar.

Close to the Jain temple, the ruin is an old temple to the Sun, Surya, the Kathis' favourite god. There is a writing, described as an incorrect stringing together of the praises of Shiv under the incarnation of Rudra. The temple still contains the image of the Sun god, represented with a male and female attendant on each side. The figure is much like that of Vishnu. Near a more modern shrine on the wall are a number of graves of Shaiv Atits, some of unusual form, a ling mounted on a series of round or square plinths laid one over the other.

Kanthkot fort is now a tourist attraction of Kutch.
