= Dasharupakam =

10th century Indian treatise on theater

Dasharupakam (Daśarūpakam) is a treatise on the structure and rules (Lakshana or Prakarana grantha) for popular theatre and drama presentations of the time, written by Dhananjaya in the 10th century. He was the court poet of Paramara king Munja. Several techniques and methods presented in the Natya Shastra and Dasharupakam are very much in use in today's theatre. The author starts with salutations, among others, to Bharata the author of Natya Shastra, whose detailed exposition he bases his work on. He however in his own words says that he has attempted to present the same in an ordered and concise fashion in his book, so it can be consumed by common folk. Rupakam means one that has a form and can be seen - essentially referring to theatre and drama performances. He uses the same word used by Bharata to refer to his work, and defines ten types of theatre performances - DashaRupakam - Ten Forms of Plays.

In the course of describing the forms of the plays, the author discusses, the subjects of Vastu(Plot), Netaa(the protagonist), and the Rasa (the emotive aspect) - which are essential to a play.

The Dasharupakam comprises four chapters, each termed as Prakaasha, and has about 300 karikaas (verses) in total, as opposed to the 6000 of the Natya Shastra. In the field of Sanskrit literature it is tradition to use unique word to refer to each chapter in a book. (Other terms used elsewhere include Ullaasas, Parichedaas, Udyota etc.). The author treats Nrutyam,Nruttham as components of a rupakam only (play);

The first chapter describes the rules for rupakam, they key elements of Drama (Vastu-the plot, Netaa(the protagonist), and Rasa (the emotive aspect)). Then discusses the types and characteristics of the Plot The second chapter explains the characteristics that the Netaa (protagonist) heroes and heroines must possess. (neta) The third chapter discusses the ten types of drama. The fourth chapter discusses Rasa in detail. However the author also states that since Rasa is a heavy subject - he will only present concise descriptions

The most famous commentary on the work, known as Avaloka, was written by Dhanika, a younger brother of the author.. Dhanika has worked to collect example verses from various plays of the time for each rule or lakshana. (such as Ratnavali, Mrucchakatikam, Venisamhara, Mahaveeracharitam etc.) and add to this book.

== Ten Rupakas according to Dasharupakam ==
1. Natakam
2. Prakaranam
3. Anka
4. Eehamruga
5. Dima
6. Samavakara
7. Bhana
8. Prahasanam
9. Veethi
10. Vyayoga
