= Durlabharaja II =

- Maharajadhiraja

King of Sapadalaksha
- Reign: c. 998–1012 CE
- Predecessor: Vigraharaja II
- Successor: Govindaraja III
- Dynasty: Chahamanas of Shakambhari
- Father: Simharaja

Durlabharaja II (r. c. 998–1012 CE) was an Indian king belonging to the Shakambhari Chahamana dynasty. He ruled the Sapadalaksha country, which included parts of present-day Rajasthan in north-western India.

Durlabha-raja was a son of the Chahamana king Simharaja. He succeeded his brother Vigraharaja II on the Chahamana throne. The Harsha inscription of Vigraharaja compares the two brothers to Rama-Lakshmana and Krishna-Balarama. He had two other brothers, named Chandraraja and Govindaraja (not to be confused with the Chahamana kings bearing same names).

Two 999 CE inscriptions from Durlabha's reigns have been discovered at Kinsariya (Parbatsar tehsil) and Sakrai in Rajasthan. According to the Sakrai inscription, he assumed the title Maharajadhiraja ("king of kings"). The Kinsariya inscription states that he was known as Durllanghya-Meru, which implies that his enemies obeyed his orders. The inscription also states that he conquered the Asosittana or Rasoshittana mandala. Historian R. B. Singh speculates that this might be present-day Rohtak district, which Durlabha probably captured from a Tomara king.

Durlabha also finds a mention in a 996 CE inscription of Dhavala, a chief of the Hastikundi Rashtrakuta branch. According to this inscription, Dhavala came to aid of a king named Mahendra, who had been overpowered by Durlabha. This Mahendra can be identified with the contemporary Naddula Chahamana king, who was a feudatory of Durlabha's rivals, the Chaulukyas. The inscription states that Dhavala used both diplomacy and force to relieve Mahendra. According to D. R. Bhandarkar, the Durlabharaja mentioned in Dhavala's inscription was a different king: the Durlabharaja Chaulukya.

The early medieval Muslim historians state that the ruler of Ajmer joined a confederacy of Hindu kings to support Anandapala against Mahmud of Ghazni in 1008 CE. R. B. Singh identifies this ruler as Durlabharaja. The confederacy failed to stop Mahmud from repeatedly plundering the Hindu territories.

Among Durlabha's subordinates, a minister named Madhava and a feudatory named Dadhichika Chachcha are known. He was succeeded by his brother Govindaraja III.
