= Sundha Mata Temple =

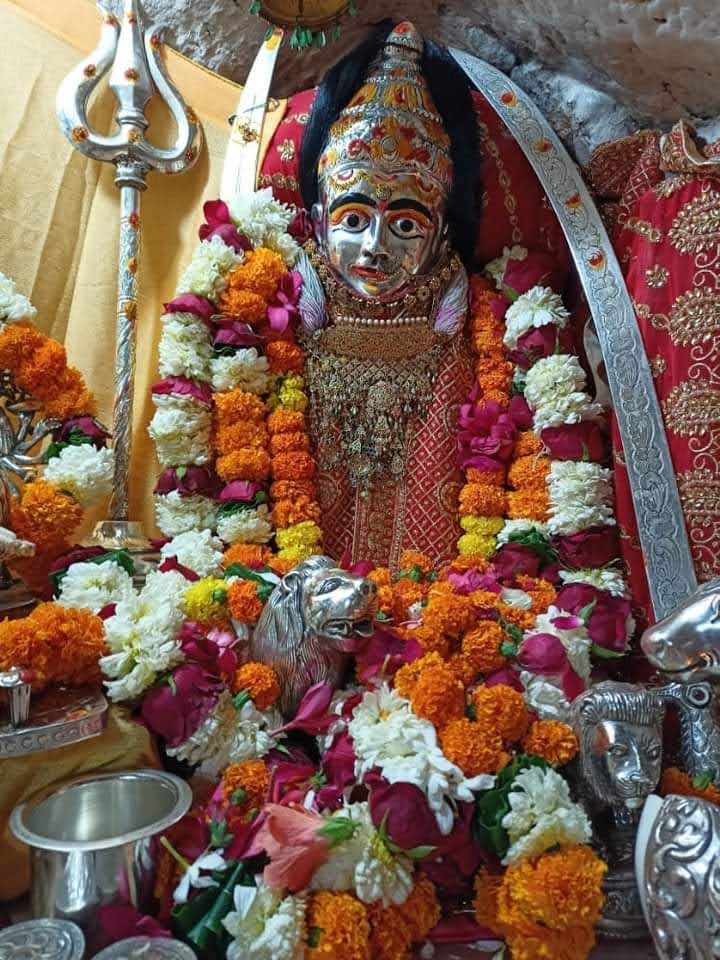
- Chamuda Mata of Sundha

- Location in Rajasthan Sundha Mata Temple (India)

Religion
- Affiliation: Hinduism
- District: Jalore
- Deity: Chamunda Devi

Location
- Location: Sundha, Bhinmal
- State: Rajasthan
- Country: India
- Coordinates: 24.833°N 72.367°E

Architecture
- Creator: unknown
- Completed: unknown

Sundha Mata temple is a temple of the Hindu goddess Chamunda on a hilltop called Sundha, at longitude 72.367°E and latitude 24.833°N, in Jalore District of Rajasthan, India. It is believed to be more than 900 years old. It was built by Deval Pratiharas, with help from the Chauhans of Jalore.
