= Dasharatha Sharma =

Indian historian and Indologist (1903–1976)

- Born: 1903; Churu, Bikaner State, British Raj
- Died: 1976 (aged 72–73)
- Education: MA in History and Sanskrit
- Occupation: Indologist

Dasharatha Sharma (1903–1976) was an Indologist with a particular interest in the history of the Rajasthan region of India. Born in the Rajasthani city of Churu, he studied in the city of Bikaner and at the University of Delhi. He had degrees of Master of Arts (M.A.) in History and Sanskrit and received a Doctor of Literature (D. Litt.) for his thesis, Early Chauhan Dynasties.

== Academic appointments ==
Sharma was the head of the Department of History at Hindu College, University of Delhi, and later was appointed Reader (equivalent of Associate Professor) in Ancient History at the University of Delhi. In 1966, he was appointed as Professor and Head of the Department of History at the University of Jodhpur (now renamed Jai Narain Vyas University) and later became Dean of the Faculty of Arts at the same institution. After retirement from the University of Jodhpur, Prof. Sharma served as Director of the Rajasthan Puratattva Mandir near the Rajasthan Oriental Research Institute in Jodhpur. He also presided over the Ancient History section of the Indian History Congress in 1967 and the General History section of the Rajasthan History Congress in 1969.

== Authorship ==
Sharma published over 400 research papers and notes on a wide range of subjects. His Early Chauhan Dynasties was first published in 1959; a revised edition was published in 1975 and reprinted in 2002. The manuscript argues that the Agnikula myth of the origin of Rajputs was adapted from Valmiki and calculates the year of birth for Prithiviraj III using planetary positions described in the Prithvirajavijaya. It also attributes the success of Muhammad Ghori to the rivalry between the Chauhans of Shakhambari and the Chaulukyas (Solanki) of Gujarat. Amongst other subjects, Lectures on Rajput history and culture elaborate on the origin of the Rajputs, bring attention to the celebration in Kannauj after Prithviraj III was defeated at the Second Battle of Tarain, follow the 13th-century Rajput struggle for survival, and discuss the Rajput resurgence represented by Maharana Kumbha and Rao Jodha.

In 1960, Sharma was appointed by the Rajasthan State Archives as General Editor of a comprehensive history of Rajasthan to be published by the Government of Rajasthan. This became the definitive work on the history of Rajasthan. Titled Rajasthan through the Ages this work was largely written by Sharma and was published in 1966. Samrat Prithiviraj Chauhan tritiya aur unka yug (in Hindi) is an updated text on Prithviraja III.

=== Monographs ===
- Early Chauhan Dynasties: a study of Chauhan political history, Chauhan political institutions, and life in the Chauhan dominions, from 800 to 1316 A D :Dasharatha Sharma; with a foreword by K.M. Panikkar. ISBN 0-8426-0618-1
- Rajasthan through the ages: a comprehensive and authentic history of Rajasthan, prepared under the orders of the Government of Rajasthan (Volume I) General Editor: Dasharatha Sharma. Publisher: Rajasthan State Archives, Bikaner, 1966.
- Lectures on Rajput history and culture (Raghunath Prosad Nopany Lectures 1966), Motilal Banarsidass, Jawahar Nagar, Delhi, 1970. ISBN 0-8426-0262-3.
