= Nadol =

- Census town
- Location in Rajasthan, India Nadol (India)
- Coordinates: 25.367°N 73.45°E
- Country: India
- State: Rajasthan
- District: Pali
- Talukas: Desuri

Government
  - Body: Gram Panchayat
- Elevation: 309 m (1,014 ft)

Population (2001)
  - Total: 9,020

Languages
  - Official: Hindi, Marwari
- Time zone: UTC+5:30 (IST)
- PIN: 306603
- Telephone code: 02934
- Vehicle registration: RJ-22
- Sex ratio: 1033 ♂/♀
- Lok Sabha constituency: Pali (Lok Sabha Constituency)
- Vidhan Sabha constituency: Bali
- Civic agency: Gram Panchayat
- Avg. annual temperature: 30 °C (86 °F)
- Avg. summer temperature: 44 °C (111 °F)
- Avg. winter temperature: 05 °C (41 °F)

Nadol is a census town in Desuri tehsil of Pali district, India. Ashapura Mataji temple and Shri Nadol Tirth attract pilgrims.

== History ==
Nadol was originally called Naddula. The Chahamanas of Naddula (called Chauhans of Nadol in vernacular legends) ruled the town and its surrounding areas during the 10th-12th century CE. Their founder was Lakshmana, a prince of the Shakambhari Chahamana dynasty. He carved out a principality at Nadol, while his brother Simharaja ascended the ancestral throne. Nadol was ruled by his descendants until Jayatasimha was defeated by the Ghurids. Later, the Jalor Chahamana king Udayasimha (a relative of Jayatasimha) captured Nadol. The area was captured by the Delhi Sultanate after Alauddin Khalji defeated Udayasimha's descendant Kanhadadeva in 1311.

The town is also famous for the temple of Ashapura Mata which was built by the first chauhan ruler of Nadol Lakshmana Chauhan in 10th century. She is worshipped as a kuldevi of chaunhans of the region.

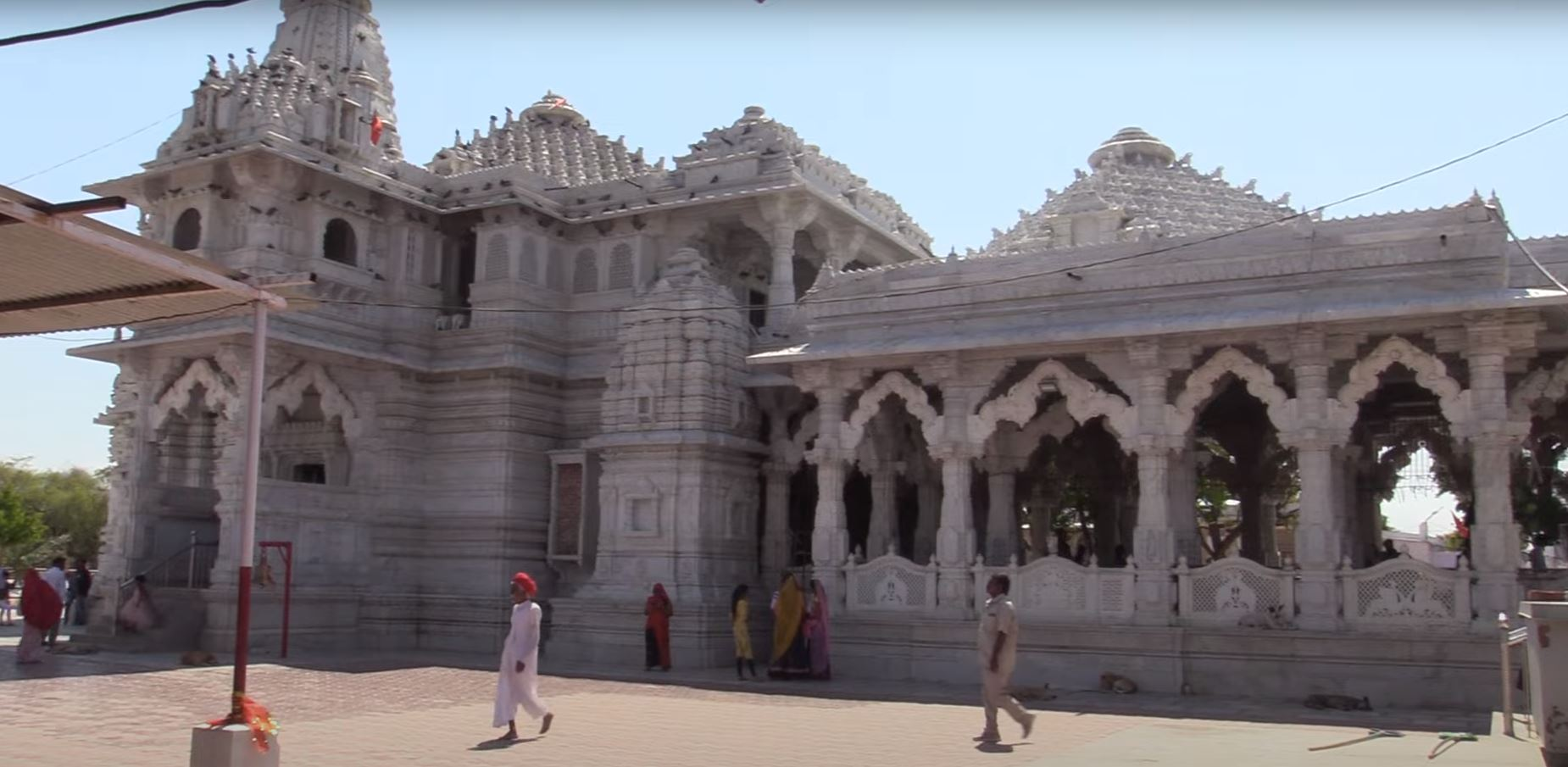
Nadol Ashapura temple

Recent excavations by Dept. of Archaeology, Rajasthan has revealed that though this area was occupied since Stone age, Nadol was a flourishing town during 9th-10th century. First excavation was done in 1996, but recent excavation done at Juna Khera has revealed traces of Living rooms, Kitchen, furnaces. Stone blocks of marble and granite were used in construction of buildings, mud mortar was also used in construction. Coins from Chauhan era were also found.

== Temple of Ashapura Mata ==
The temple of Ashapura Mata was built by the first Chauhan king of Nadol, Lakshmana, after establishing his rule over Nadol with the blessings of their Kuldevi Shakambhari devi of Sambhar. As he became ruler of Nadol with the blessings obtained from Sakabhari Devi by fulfilling his hope, Sakambhari Devi became famous as "Ashapura Mata." Since then, it has been the main pilgrimage site for the whole Chauhan clan in the region. Today, the temple is the main attraction for Nadol's tourism.

== Demographics ==
According to Census 2001, Nadol has a population of 9,020, including 4,437 males and 4,583 females.
