= Rayapala =

King of Naddula from 1132 to 1145

- Maharajadhiraja Parameshvara

King of Naddula
- Reign: c. 1132–1145 CE
- Predecessor: Ratnapala
- Successor: Katukaraja
- Dynasty: Chahamanas of Naddula

Rayapala (IAST: Rāyapāla, r. c. 1132–1145 CE) was an Indian king belonging to the Naddula Chahamana dynasty. He ruled the area around Naddula (present-day Nadol in Rajasthan), before his relative Katukaraja seized the power.

== Reign ==
Rayapala was the son of his predecessor Ratnapala, and ascended the throne around 1132 CE. He assumed the title Maharajadhiraja Parameshvara, which indicates his sovereign status.

Rayapala had two queens: Padmala-devi and Manala-devi. Padmala was the mother of princes Sahajapala and Sahanapala. The deities Padmaleshvara, Sahajapaleshvara and Sahanapaleshvara were named after these three persons. Manala was the mother of princes Rudrapala and Amritapala.

Rayapala's father Ratnapala had dislodged his uncle Asharaja to ascend the throne of Naddula. In 1145 CE, Asharaja's son Katukaraja seized the throne of Naddula. According to historian Dasharatha Sharma, Rayapala's immediate successor was his son Sahajapala, who probably lost the control of his kingdom during a war between his two powerful neighbours: Arnoraja and Kumarapala.
