= Katukaraja =

King of Naddula from 1145 to 1148

King of Naddula
- Reign: c. 1145–1148 CE
- Predecessor: Rayapala
- Successor: Alhanadeva
- Dynasty: Chahamanas of Naddula
- Father: Asharaja

Katuka-raja (IAST: Kaṭukarāja, r. c. 1145–1148 CE) was an Indian king belonging to the Naddula Chahamana dynasty. He ruled the area around Naddula (present-day Nadol in Rajasthan), after seizing the power from his relative Rayapala.

== Reign ==
Katukaraja was a son of the Chahamana monarch Asharaja, who was dislodged by his brother Ratnapala. After losing the throne of Naddula, Asharaja became a vassal of the Chaulukya emperor Jayasimha Siddharaja. Meanwhile, Ratnapala was succeeded by his son Rayapala. Around 1145 CE, Katukaraja seized the throne of Naddula. This is apparent from Katukaraja's 1144-45 Sewari inscription, in which he assumes the title Maharajadhiraja.

The inscriptions of Katukaraja are dated in the Simha calendar era, which was used in the present-day Gujarat region. His successors were vassals of the Chaulukya kings of Gujarat. Based on this, historian R. B. Singh believes that he captured Naddula with help of the Chaulukya emperor Kumarapala. Singh further theorizes that following Jayasimha's death, Katukaraja may have helped Kumarapala in a war of success against a rival claimant to the Chaulukya throne.

According to a Sewari inscription, as a prince, Katukaraja made a donation to Jains for the worship of Shantinatha, on the occasion of Shivaratri.

Katukaraja's successor was his younger brother Alhanadeva, who served as a vassal of Kumarapala. Another of his brothers, Purnapaksha, also accepted Kumarapala's suzerainty. Purnapaksha controlled the principality of Ratanpur, and is mentioned as a subordinate of Kumarapala in the Ratanpur inscription of his queen Girija-devi.
