= Alhana =

Alhana may refer to:

- Alhana Starbreeze, a fictional character in the Dragonlance novels
- Alhanadeva, 12th century Indian king
- Ajayaraja II, 12th century Indian king; called Alhana in the epic poem Hammira Mahakavya
