= Ladol =

Ladol may refer to:

- Ladol, Gujarat, a town in India
- Ladol, Alabel, a barangay in Philippines
- LADOL or Lagos Deep Offshore Logistics Base, an industrial Free Zone in Nigeria
