= Asharaja =

King of Naddula from 1110 to 1119

- Maharajadhiraja

King of Naddula
- Reign: c. 1110–1119 CE
- Predecessor: Jojalladeva
- Successor: Ratnapala
- Dynasty: Chahamanas of Naddula
- Father: Jendraraja

Asharaja (IAST: Āśārāja, r. c. 1110–1119 CE) was an Indian king belonging to the Naddula Chahamana dynasty. He ruled the area around Naddula (present-day Nadol in Rajasthan), before being dethroned by his nephew Ratnapala. He then accepted the suzerainty of his family's rival, the Chaulukya king Jayasimha Siddharaja. He participated in Jayasimha's successful war against the Paramara king Naravarman. His son Katukaraja seized the Naddula throne after his death.

== Reign ==
Asharaja was the youngest son of the Chahamana king Jendraraja. He is also known as Ashvaka (Aśvaka) and Ashvaraja (Aśvarāja). He succeeded his elder brothers Prithvipala and Jojalladeva on the Chahamana throne. According to the Sundha Hill inscription, he once rescued Prithvipala, when the latter had been surrounded by a Turushka (possibly Ghaznavid) army.

According to his 1110 CE Sewari inscription, Asharaja bore the title Maharajadhiraja ("king of great kings"). He was in control of the Naddula throne at least until 1115 CE, when his son Katukaraja was styled as the heir apparent (yuvaraja). However, by 1119 CE, his nephew (Prithvipala's son) Ratnapala had become the Chahamana king, as attested by a Sewari inscription. Ratnapala probably forcibly dislodged Asharaja, because of which Asharaja chose to become a vassal of the rival Chaulukya king Jayasimha Siddharaja. Beginning with Asharaja's reign, the Naddula kingdom started declining because of family feuds.

Asharaja's 1143 CE Bali inscription states that he subsisted on the feet (that is, was a vassal) of Jayasimha. As a Chaulukya subordinate, Asharaja participated in Jayasimha's war against the Paramara king Naravarman. The Nanana inscription of Asharaja's descendant Alhana boasts that when Asharaja arrived at the Paramara capital Dhara, Naravarman hid himself in the fort. The Sundha Hill inscription also states that Jayasimha was pleased with the Asharaja's assistance in the Paramara territory of Malava.

Asharaja commissioned the Chandaleshvara temple as well as other temples dedicated to Shiva. He granted the Pinchchhavalli village to the Tripurusha temple. He also built several gardens, free kitchens, prapas (water fountains or cisterns), tanks, wells and stepwells. During his reign, prince Katukaraja made a donation to a Jain shrine at Sewari.

Asharaja had at least two queens: Delhana-devi and Chandala-devi. Delhana was the daughter of one Rudrapala, and the mother of Alhanadeva. Asharaja's son Katukaraja appears to have grabbed power in Naddula by dislodging Ratnapala's son Rayapala, with support from the Chaulukya ruler Kumarapala. He is styled as a Maharajadhiraja in his 1144-45 Sewari inscription. Katukaraja's younger brother Alhanadeva succeeded his the Chahamana king, and ruled as Kumarapala's vassal. Jayatasimha, another son of Asharaja, is named as the heir apparent (yuvaraja) of the Samipati bhukti (province) in the 1144-45 CE inscription.
