= Jagaddeva =

Jagaddeva may refer to:

- Jagaddeva (Paramara dynasty), 11th century prince from the Paramara dynasty of central India
- Jagaddeva (Chahamana dynasty), 12th century ruler from the Chahamana dynasty of north-western India
