= Kumarapala (Chaulukya dynasty) =

King of Gujarat from 1143 to 1172

Kumārapāla
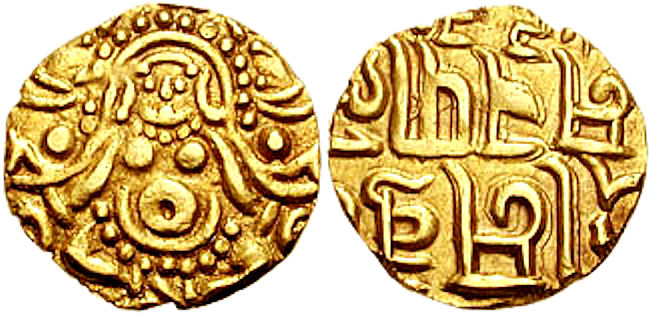
- Coin of Kumarapala featuring a seated Lakshmi on one side and Śrīmat-Kumārapāladeva written on other side.

King of Gujarāta
- Reign: 1143–1172
- Predecessor: Jayasiṃha Siddharāja
- Successor: Ajayapāla
- Born: Dadhisthali (now Dethali near Siddhpur)
- Dynasty: Chaulukya (Solaṅkī)
- Father: Tribhuvanpāla
- Religion: Jainism, Shaivism

Kumarapala (r. 1143–1172) was a ruler from the Chaulukya (Solanki) dynasty of present-day western India. He ruled present-day Gujarat and surrounding areas, from his capital Anahilapataka (modern Patan).

Kumarapala was a descendant of the Chaulukya king Bhima I. The information about him largely come from two sources – the numerous Sanskrit and Apabhramasa-Prakrit language inscriptions and the Jain texts. These provide a highly inconsistent historical profile in some respects, and corroborate each other in some. Both portray Kumarapala as a keen and generous patron of arts and architecture, one who supported the divergent religious Indian traditions in Western India, particularly Gujarat and Rajasthan region.

Kumarapala inscriptions predominantly invoke Shiva – a Hindu god, and they do not mention any Jain Tirthankara or Jaina deity. The major Veraval inscription calls him Mahesvara-nripa-agrani (worshipper of Shiva), and even Jain texts state that he worshipped Somanatha (Somesvara, Shiva). He rebuilt a spectacular Somanatha-Patan tirtha site with many Hindu temples, bathing ghats and pilgrim facilities, according to one inscription, thereby expanding the Somnath temple his father rebuilt after the plunder and destruction by Mahmud of Ghazni. The inscriptions suggest that he was a Hindu and participated in Brahmanic rituals, at least till the last known inscriptions that mention him.

According to Jain texts such as those written by Hemachandra and Prabhachandra, Kumarapala spent his early life in exile to avoid persecution by his relative and predecessor Jayasimha Siddharaja. He ascended the throne after Jayasimha's death, with help of his brother-in-law. He ruled for nearly three decades, during which he subdued a number of neighbouring kings, including the Chahamana king Arnoraja and the Shilahara king Mallikarjuna. He also annexed the Paramara territory of Malwa to his kingdom by defeating Ballala. Kumarapala, state the Jain text, became a disciple of the Jain scholar Hemachandra and adopted Jainism towards the end of his reign. The Jain texts composed after his death, additionally state that after his conversion, Kumarapala banned all killing of animals in his kingdom – a law that would be consistent with the Ahimsa principle. Multiple legendary biographies by medieval Jain chroniclers present him as the last great royal patron of Jainism. However, the inscriptions and the evidence from rulers who succeeded Kumarapala do not corroborate the Jain texts. Furthermore, the Jaina chronicles differ substantially in important details about his life.

== Sources of information ==
The information about him largely come from two sources – the numerous Sanskrit and Apabhramasa-Prakrit language inscriptions and the Jain texts. These provide a highly inconsistent historical profile in some respects, and corroborate each other in some. Both portray Kumarapala as a patron of all arts and architecture, leaving behind a legacy of major Hindu and Jain temples and tirtha sites. These different sources of information also present him as a king who supported the divergent religious Indian traditions in Western India, particularly Gujarat and Rajasthan region.

Kumarapala is the subject of several major chronicles by medieval Jain scholars. These scholars include Hemachandra (Dvyashraya and Mahaviracharita), Prabhachandra, Somaprabha (Kumarapala-Pratibodha), Merutunga (Prabandha-Chintamani), Jayasimha Suri, Rajashekhara and Jina-Mandana Suri, among others. Of all the Indian kings, the largest number of chronicles have been written about Kumarapala. However, these chronicles differ substantially in important details about his life.

== Background ==
=== Ancestry ===
All sources state that Kumarapala was the successor of Jayasimha Siddharaja, who was his relative and hated him.

According to Hemachandra, Kumarapala was a descendant of the earlier Chaulukya king Bhima I through Kshemaraja, Devaprasada and Tribhuvanapala. Kshemaraja, who was the elder son of Bhima, renounced his rights to the throne, and retired to Dadhisthali as an ascetic. His younger brother Karna succeeded their father on the throne. Karna sent Keshmaraja's son Devaprasada to look after him at Dadhisthali. After Karna's death, his own son Jayasimha ascended the throne. When Devaprasada learned about Karna's death, he sent his son Tribhuvanapala to Jayasimha's court, and committed suicide. Kumarapala was Tribhuvanapala's son, and succeeded Jayasimha.

Jayasimha Suri also provides a similar genealogy. He mentions some additional details: Kshemaraja and Karna were Bhima's sons by different women; and Kumarapala was the eldest son of Tribhuvanapala and Kashmiradevi. The genealogy given by Somaprabha and Prabhachandra is similar to the one provided by Hemachandra, but Prabhachandra omits the name of Kshemaraja.

According to Merutugna, Kumarapala was a descendant of Bhima I through Haripala and Tribhuvanapala. Haripala was a son of Bhima and a concubine named Bakuladevi. Merutunga's genealogy seems to be historically inaccurate, as the fragmentary Chittorgarh inscription corroborates Hemachandra's genealogy. However, historian A. K. Majumdar notes that the voluntary rejections of thrones are very rare, and therefore, Hemachandra's claim of Kshemaraja having voluntary give up his throne is doubtful. Hemachandra, who was a royal courtier, probably invented a fictional narrative to avoid mentioning the illegitimate son Haripala. This also explains why Karna's son Jayasimha Siddharaja hated Kumarapala.

Jina-Mandana Suri attempted to reconcile Merutunga's account with Jayasimha Suri's account. According to him, Kshemaraja's mother was Bakuladevi and Karna's mother was Udayamati. Bhima gave his kingdom to his younger son Karna, to please his younger wife Udayamati.

Multiple chroniclers state that Kumarapala's brother-in-law Krishna-deva served as Jayasimha's general. According to Prabhachandra, Kumarapala's brother Kirtipala also served as Jayasimha's general, in an expedition against Navaghana.

== Early life and ascension ==
Kumarapala's contemporary chronicler Hemachandra does not mention anything about the king's life before his ascension to the throne. This is unusual, because Hemachandra's narratives about other kings of the dynasty describe their early lives. Historian Ashoke Majumdar theorizes that this might be because Hemachandra played a significant role in Kumarapala's early life, as mentioned by later chroniclers. Yashahpala, another contemporary writer, provides a hint about the king's early life in his drama Maharaja-Parajaya. In this play, a character states that Kumarapala "wandered alone through the whole world", suggesting that the king spent his early life wandering away from the royal court.

Prabhachandra provides the following account of Kumarapala's early life: One day, Jayasimha Siddharaja learned through divination that Kumarapala would be his successor. This made Jayasimha very angry, because he hated Kumarapala. Fearing for his life, Kumarapala fled the kingdom in form of a mendicant. Sometime later, Jayasimha's spies told him that Kumarapala had returned to the capital disguised as an ascetic. Jayasimha then invited 300 ascetics to a feast, and washed their feet in order to identify Kumarapala (who had royal marks on his feet). Kumarapala was recognized, but fled to Hemachandra's house before he could be arrested. Jayasimha's men followed him, but Hemachandra hid him under palm leaves. After leaving Hemachandra's house, Kumarapala was similarly saved by a farmer named Āli. He then went to Khambhat, accompanied by a Brahmin named Bosari. There, he sought shelter with a rich man named Udayana, who turned him away to avoid enmity with the king Jayasimha. Fortunately for Kumarapala, Hemachandra had also arrived at a Jain monastery in Khambhat. Hemachandra gave him food and shelter, and predicted that he would become the king after 7 years. The Jain scholar also took 3,200 drammas (gold coins) from a Jain layman, and gave them to Kumarapala. Subsequently, Kumarapala spent years traveling as a Kapalika ascetic, before being joined by his wife Bhopaladevi and their children. When Jayasimha died, Kumarapala returned to the capital and met Hemachandra. The next day, he arrived at the royal palace, accompanied by his brother-in-law Krishna-deva, who commanded 10,000 horses. There, he was proclaimed as the new king after two other claimants were rejected.

Merutunga mentions a similar legend: Some astrologers told Jayasimha that Kumarapala would succeed him. To escape Jayasimha's anger, Kumarapala spent many years in foreign lands, disguised as an ascetic. Subsequently, he returned to the capital Anahilapataka, and lived in a monastery. One day, Jayasimha invited several monks and washed their feet on the occasion of his father's shraddha (a ceremony for the deceased ancestors). Kumarapala was recognized, but managed to escape. He was saved by a potter named Āliga, took 20 silver coins from a mouse, and was given food by an unnamed rich lady. Later, Kumarapala reached Khambhat, planning to seek resources from the royal minister Udayana. He learned that Udayana had gone to a Jain monastery, and followed him there. At the monastery, he met Hemachandra, who prophesied that Kumarapala will become a monarch in 1199 VS. Kumarapala was astonished at this prophecy, and promised to become a Jain if it came true. Udayana then arranged for Kumarapala to travel to Malava. In Malava, Kumarapala saw an inscription at the Kudangeshvara temple, predicting his ascension to the throne in 1199 VS. After Jayasimha's death, Kumarapala returned to Anahilapataka, and visited his sister's husband Kanhada-deva. The next morning, he arrived at the royal palace, accompanied by Kanhada's army. After rejecting two princes, Kanhada appointed Kumarapala as the new king.

Jayasimha Suri provides a slightly different account: Kumarapala lived at Dadhisthali, where his great-grandfather had retired. Once, he came to Anahilapataka, where he received a sermon from Hemachandra, before returning to Dadhisthali. Jayasimha Siddharaja, who was childless, was devastated when Hemachandra predicted that Kumarapala would succeed him as the king. He had Kumarapala's father Tribhuvanapala murdered. Kumarapala sought advice from his brother-in-law Krishna-deva, who told him to leave Dadisthali in a mendicant's disguise. Kumarapala followed the advice, but returned to the capital sometime later. When Jayasimha learned about this, he invited all the mendicants to his father's shraddha ceremony, and recognized Kumarapala while washing his feet. Kumarapala managed to escape. He was saved by a farmer named Bhimasimha, took money from a mouse, was given food by a woman named Devashri, and was again saved by a potter named Sajjana. Next, he met his friend Bosari and the two went to the monastery at Khambhat. At the monastery, Hemachandra told Udayana that Kumarapala would become the king one day. He also saved Kumarapala from Jayasimha's spies. With help from Udayana, Kumarapala then traveled to Bharuch. From there, he proceeded to Ujjain, Kollapura, Kanchi, and finally Kolambapattana. There, the deity Somanatha appeared in the dream of the local king Pratapasimha, and ordered him to help Kumarapala. After spending some days in Kollambapattana, Kumarapala returned to Ujjain, where he read the prophecy about his future kingship at the Kundageshvara temple. Next, he visited Chittor with his family. As the date of his prophesied kingship (1199 VS) came closer, he returned to Anahilapataka. Shortly after, Jayasimha died, and Kumarapala reached the palace with Krishna-deva. There, he was made the king after two other claimants were found unsuitable. His sister Premaladevi performed the mangalika ceremony, and Udayana's son Vagabhata was made an amatya (minister).

Jina-Mandana Suri's account of Kumarapala's early life is largely borrowed from the earlier chroniclers. But it does contain some original elements: for example, Kumarapala does not go to Hemachandra; rather, Hemachandra realizes that he is nearby, by sensing some signs indicating presence of a prince, such as "a lizard dancing on a serpent's head". Abul Fazl also states that Kumarapala lived in exile fearing for his life, and returned to the capital only after the death of Jai Singh (that is, Jayasimha).

The contemporary Muslim historian Muhammad Aufi mentioned a king called Rai Gurpal (of Nahrawala), who surpassed all other kings of Hindustan in good qualities. According to Aufi, Gurpal spent many years as a mendicant and suffered "all the miseries of travel", before he became a king. Historian Ashoke Majumdar identifies Gurpal with Kumarapala.

The historicity of these legendary narratives is debatable, but it is known that Kumarapala seized the throne after sudden death of Jayasimha. This is known from two inscriptions dated to Kumarapala's reign: the 1145 CE Mangrol inscription issued by his Guhila feudatory, and the 1169 CE Veraval prashasti inscription issued by the Shaivite priest Bhava Brihaspati. Jayasimha's only known male descendant was his daughter's son, the Chahamana prince Someshvara. Someshvara was too young to become a king at that time, and Kumarapala may have seized the throne with the support of powerful persons, including his brother-in-law Krishna-deva (Kanhada-deva) and rich Jains such as Udayana. There might be some truth to Kumarapala's wanderings during his early years as well. But the greater part of the legendary narratives appears to be fanciful.

The Jain chronicles mention that Kumarapala ascended the throne in 1199 VS (1042 CE). However, this is known to be inaccurate: a 1200 VS (1043 CE) inscription of Jayasimha has been found at Bali in Pali district of Rajasthan. The inaccuracy appears to have resulted from the later chroniclers' misinterpretation of Hemachandra's Mahaviracharita. In this text, Mahavira tells Hemachandra that Kumarapala will become a king when 1669 years have passed after his death. This implies that Kumarapala became the king after the end of the year 1199 VS, that is in 1200 VS.

== Reign and military career ==
Find spots of inscriptions issued during the reign of Kumarapala

According to Merutunga, the ministers who had served Jayasimha tried to have the newly crowned Kumarapala assassinated. But Kumarapala survived after being forewarned by a loyal servant, and had the conspirators killed. Sometime later, his brother-in-law Kanhada-deva, who had played an important role in his ascension, started making fun of him by divulging secrets from his days as a mendicant. Kumarapala warned him to stop doing this, but Kanhada didn't comply with this request. As a result, Kumarapala had his limbs paralyzed by wrestlers and also blinded him. After this incident, all the officers and samantas (feudatories) started treating the new king with respect.

Historical evidence suggests that Kumarapala's empire extended from Chittor and Jaisalmer in the north to the Vindhyas and the Tapti River in the south (ignoring his raid of the Shilahara kingdom of northern Konkana). In the west, it included Kachchha and Saurashtra; in the east, it extended up to at least Vidisha (Bhilsa). The Jain chroniclers provide highly exaggerated accounts of the territorial extent of Kumarapala's kingdom. For example, Udayaprabha claims that Kumarapala's empire included Andhra, Anga, Chauda, Gauda, Kalinga, Karnata, Kuru, Lata, Medapata, Maru, and Vanga. Such claims are of little historical value.

=== Chahamanas of Shakambhari ===
==== Arnoraja ====
Arnoraja, the Shakambhari Chahamana king, ruled the Sapadalaksha country to the north of Kumarapala's kingdom. His wife was a daughter of Jayasimha Siddharaja, and their son Someshvara had been brought up at the Chaulukya court. There appear to have been two wars between Arnoraja and Kumarapala.

The first war appears to have been caused by Arnoraja's opposition to Kumarapala's ascension to the Gujarat throne. According to historian A. K. Majumdar, Arnoraja may have planned to replace Kumarapala with his son Someshvara. Jayasimha's nominee and adopted son Chahada (also called Bahada or Charubhatta) formed an alliance with Arnoraja, and instigated him to fight Kumarapala. This is attested by several sources, including Dvyashraya (Kumarapala Charita), and Prabandha Chintamani. Merutunga's Prabandha Chintamani states that Chahada felt insulted by Kumarapala, and went to Sapdalaksha, where he instigated the king and his feudatories to attack Kumarapala by bribing them. Chahada also managed to win over a large part of Kumarapala's army. As a result, Kumarapala was betrayed by several of his own soldiers on the battlefield. Despite this, he won the battle. Chahada was captured, after he fell to ground while trying to jump on Kumarapala's elephant. Kumarapala also wounded Arnoraja with an iron dart, and captured the horses of the Chahamana generals. The accounts of Prabhachandra, Jayasimha Suri, Rajashekhara and Jina-Mandana are similar to that of Merutunga. According to Kumarapala Charita, Arnoraja suffered from an arrow shot in his face during the war. Prabachandra states that Kumarapala's army unsuccessfully besieged Arnoraja's capital Ajayameru 11 times. Before launching the 12th campaign, Kumarapala prayed Ajitanatha on his minister's advice. This time, he defeated Arnoraja, whose ally included Jayasimha's adopted son Charubhata.

Hemachandra's Dvyashraya states that after being defeated, Arnoraja concluded a peace treaty by arranging the marriage of his daughter Jahlana to Kumarapala. According to Kumarapala Charita, Kumarapala's sister also married Arnoraja. Despite the conflict, Kumarapala treated Arnoraja's son Someshvara well. According to the Chahamana chronicle Prithviraja Vijaya, Kumarapala (literally "Boy Protector") became worthy of his name through his treatment of Someshvara.

Sometime around 1150 CE, there was a second war between Arnoraja and Kumarapala. According to the Jain chroniclers of Gujarat (such as Jayasimha Suri, Rajashekhara and Jina-Mandana), Arnoraja once insulted Jains while playing chess with his wife Devalladevi. Devalladevi, a devout Jain and a sister of Kumarapala, asked her brother to avenge this insult. Historian A. K. Majumdar points out that Kumarapala converted to Jainism at a later date, so the legend about his sister getting offended by Arnoraja appears to be historically inaccurate. According to Dasharatha Sharma, Devalladevi is a fictional character created by either Rajashekhara or another Jain writer, as none of the chronicles written before 14th century mention her. According to Majumdar, Arnoraja invaded the Chaulukya kingdom taking advantage of Kumarapala's involvement in other conflicts.

This second war also ended with Arnoraja's defeat. Kumarapala's victory over Arnoraja is corroborated by the Vadnagar prashasti inscription. His 1150 CE Chittorgarh inscription also states that he defeated the king of Shakambhari, devastated the Sapadalaksha country and then set up a camp at Shalipura. The Veraval prashasti also states that Kumarapala defeated the king of Jangala (another name for the Chahamana territory).

==== Vigraharaja IV ====
Arnoraja's son Vigraharaja IV launched several expeditions against the Chaulukyas to avenge his father's defeat. According to the Bijolia rock inscription, he killed one Sajjana, a feudatory (samanta) of Kumarapala at Chitrakuta (Chittor). The Jain author Somatilaka Suri states that Vigraharaja's army captured Sajjana's elephant force. While Vigraharaja was busy fighting at Chittor, Kumarapala tried to create a diversion by besieging Nagaur, but lifted the siege after learning about Vigraharaja's victory at Chittor.

Vigraharaja also subdued the Chahamanas of Naddula, who were feudatories of Kumarapala. The Bijolia inscription boasts that he destroyed the enemy cities of Javalipura (Jalore), Pallika (Pali) and Naddula (Nadol). The Naddula ruler subdued by him may have been Alhanadeva. Vigraharaja also defeated one Kuntapala, who can be identified with a Naddula Chahamana subordinate of Kumarapala.

A Chahamana prashasti (eulogy) boasts that Vigraharaja reduced Kumarapala to a karavalapala (probably the designation of a subordinate officer). This is obviously an exaggeration, but it does appear that Vigraharaja conquered some of Kumarapala's territories. The Chahamana-Chaulukya relations probably became normal when Arnoraja's son Someshvara became the Chahamana king in later years, possibly with support from Kumarapala.

=== Paramaras of Abu ===
The writings of Prabhachandra, Jayasimha Suri, and Jina-Mandana Suri mention Kumarapala's conflict with Vikramasimha, a ruler of the Paramara branch of Abu. Kumarapala passed through Abu during his march against Arnoraja. Vikramasimha considered Kumarapala an usurper, and made a plan to assassinate him. He invited Kumarapala to dinner at his palace, but Kumarapala sent his officers instead. One of these officers told Kumarapala about Vikramasimha's treacherous plan.

After defeating Arnoraja, Kumarapala returned to Abu, and had Vikramasimha imprisoned. He appointed Vikramasimha's nephew Yashodhavala as the new chief of Abu.

=== Chahamanas of Naddula ===
The Chahamanas of Naddula were the northern neighbours and longstanding rivals of the Chaulukyas. Asharaja, a former king of Naddula, had accepted Chaulukya suzerainty during Jayasimha's reign, after being dislodged by his nephew Ratnapala. Asharaja's son Katukaraja seized the throne of Naddula around 1145 CE. His inscriptions of Katukaraja are dated in the Simha calendar era, which was used in the present-day Gujarat region. Based on this, historian R. B. Singh believes that he captured Naddula with help of Kumarapala. Katukaraja's younger brother and successor Alhanadeva ruled as Kumarapala's vassal.

After becoming Kumarapala's feudatories, the Chahamanas of Naddula suffered an invasion by the Shakambhari Chahamanas. During this time, in the 1150s CE, Kumarapala appointed his own governors at Naddula. In 1156 CE, Kumarapala's governor Pratapasimha was ruling at Naddula. In 1159 CE, another governor Vayajaladeva was in charge of Naddula. This governor is also known as Vaijalladeva and Vaijaka in historical records. However, by 1161 CE, Kumarapala had restored Alhanadeva's rule in Naddula.

Historian A. K. Majumdar theorizes that the Shakambhari Chahamana king Vigraharaja IV subdued Alhanadeva. As a result, Kumarapala placed Naddula under his own governors, and restored Alhanadeva's rule when Vigraharaja turned his attention away from Naddula to focus on northern campaigns. Historian R. B. Singh theorizes that Alhanadeva joined Vigraharaja's predecessor Arnoraja against Kumarapala. As a result, Kumarapala appointed his own governors at Naddula. Later, Alhanadeva came back to Kumarapala, and helped him defeat Arnoraja. Kumarapala restored Alhanadeva's rule in a part of his former kingdom, but retained control of Naddula through his own governors. Later, Alhanadeva served him in a southern campaign, as a result of which Kumarapala restored Naddula to him.

According to a Sundha Hill inscription, the Gurjara king (that is, Kumarapala) sought Alhanadeva's assistance in establishing peace in the hilly areas of Saurashtra. An 1171 CE inscription proves that Alhanadeva's son Kelhanadeva continued to serve Kumarapala as a feudatory.

=== Paramaras of Kiradu ===
The Paramara branch at Kiradu continued to acknowledge the Chaulukya suzerainty during Kumarapala's reign, as it had done under Jayasimha. The Kiradu inscription of the Paramara ruler Someshvara states that he gained control of Sindhurajapura with Jayasimha's help in 1141 CE, and made it secure in 1148 CE after gaining Kumarapala's favour. Alhana, the Chahamana ruler of Naddula, also issued an inscription from Kiradu in 1152 CE. It is possible he was temporarily appointed as the governor of Kiradu during this period. In 1161 CE, Someshvara captured two forts from a man named Jajjaka, as a result of which he gained a considerable wealth, including 1,700 horses. Jajjaka managed to get back his territories after acknowledging Kumarapala's suzerainty.

=== Ballala of Malwa ===
Jayasimha Siddharaja had captured a large part of the Paramara kingdom of Malwa. After his death, the Paramara king Jayavarman I regained control of his kingdom. However, his reign was cut short by an usurper named Ballala. According to Hemachandra, Ballala had agreed to join Arnoraja's invasion of Gujarat. However, Hemachandra does not describe him as actually participating in Arnoraja's battle against Kumarapala. It is possible that Ballala had to change his plans because of the matrimonial alliance between Arnoraja and Kumarapala. Two of Kumarapala's generals - Vijaya and Krishna - betrayed him, and joined Ballala. Kumarapala then sent an army against Ballala around 1150-51 CE.

Kumarapala's Abu Paramara feudatory Yashodhavala killed Ballala in a battle, as attested by a Mount Abu inscription. The Vadnagar prashasti inscription of Kumarapala boasts that the head of the lord of Malwa hung at the gates of the Chaulukya palace. This "lord of Malwa" is identified with Ballala.

=== Mallikarjuna ===
Kumarapala sent an army against Mallikarjuna, the Shilahara king of northern Konkana. This campaign resulted in Mallikarjuna's death.

According to Merutunga, Kumarapala ordered an attack against Mallikarjuna, because the Shilahara king bore the pompous title raja-pitamiha ("grandfather of kings"). However, the earlier writers such as Hemachandra do not mention any such reason for Kumarapala's aggression. This claim appears to be an invention of the later writers. It is possible that Kumarapala simply wanted to expand his kingdom, or was forced to take action against Mallikarjuna after a Shilhara raid in southern Gujarat.

Merutunga states that Kumarapala's army was led by Amrabhata (alias Ambada), the son of Udayana. Amrabhata's first march against Mallikarjuna was unsuccessful: the Shilaharas attacked him while his army was crossing the Kalavini river. Amrabhata was forced to retreat, and lived in seclusion as a result of this embarrassment. But Kumarapala dispatched him to Konkana with another army. During this second invasion, Amrabhata defeated Mallikarjuna. Jayasimha Suri and Jina-Mandana state that the Chaulukya army defeated Mallikarjuna during the first invasion.

Apart from Amrabhata, the Chahamana prince Someshvara and the Abu Paramara prince Dharavarsha (son of Yashodhavala) appear to have participated in this battle. The Abu prashasti of Tejapala states that Yashodhavala performed well in a battle that made the wives of the Kunkuna (Konkana) ruler cry. According to Hemachandra, Mallikarjuna fell from his elephant during the battle, and was beheaded by the Gujarat soldiers. The Chahamana chronicle Prithviraja Vijaya claims that Someshvara personally beheaded Mallikarjuna. Balachandra's Vasantavilasa claims that it Amrabhata killed Mallikarjuna. It appears that the Amrabhata was the nominal leader of the second campaign, which was actually led by Someshvara and Dharavarsha.

=== Saurashtra ===
Kumarapala waged war against a ruler of Saurashtra. Later chroniclers such as Merutunga, Jayasimha Suri and Jina-Mandana state that Kumarapala's army was led by Udayana, who was mortally wounded during this campaign. However, this claim appears to be incorrect, as the earlier writer Prabachandra states that Udayana died fighting Navaghana of Saurashtra during the reign of Jayasimha Siddharaja.

The later writers seem to have confused Jayasimha's Saurashtra campaign with that of Kumarapala. Kumarapala's Saurashtra campaign was probably against the Abhiras. His Prachi stone inscription states that he appointed one Gumadeva to control the Abhiras, and that Gumadeva's sword frightened the Abhiras. The Naddula Chahamana chief Alhana seems to have participated in this campaign, as his Sundha Hill inscription boasts that he put down disturbances in Saurashtra at Kumarapala's request.

=== After conversion to Jainism ===
The Jain chronicles state a rival king decided to invade Gujarat, taking advantage of Kumarapala's conversion to the non-violent Jain fath. This greatly worried Kumarapala, but Hemachandra assured him that the Jain deities would protect him. Hemachandra also correctly predicted that the invading king would die on a specific day during the march.

According to Prabhachandra, the invading king was the ruler of Kalyanakataka (identified with Kalyani). According to Merutunga and Jina-Mandana, the invader was Karna, the Kalachuri king of the Dahala country. When he was sleeping on his elephant, his gold chain got caught in a tree branch, strangling him to death.

The historicity of these legends is doubtful, as they claim that Hemachandra had the supernatural power to predict the invader's death on a certain day. Neither the Kalyani Chalukyas, nor the Kalachuris were in a position to attack the powerful Gujarat Chaulukya kingdom during Kumarapala's reign. Therefore, these legends appear to have been invented by the Jain chroniclers to glorify Hemachandra and to prove that Kumarapala's adoption of Jainism did not weaken him.

== Last years ==
According to Jayasimha Suri, Kumarapala planned to pass on the throne to either his nephew Ajayapala or his grandson Pratapamalla. One day, he asked Hemachandra for advice. Hemachandra recommended Pratapamalla's name, and declared that Ajayapala was not fit to be a king. This conversation was overheard by Hemachandra's disciple Balachandra, who was a childhood friend of Ajayapala. Balachandra informed Ajayapala about the king's plan. Sometime later, Hemachandra died, and Kumarapala fell ill with grief. Before the king could appoint Pratapamalla as his heir, Ajayapala mixed poison in his milk. When Kumarapala realized that he had been poisoned, he asked for an antidote from the royal store. However, Ajayapala had already hidden this antidote, and as a result, Kumarapala died of poisoning.

Other Jain chroniclers such as Rajashekhara and Jina-Mandana give similar accounts of Kumarapala's death. However, these accounts do not appear to be historically accurate. Ajayapala was a follower of Brahmanism, because of which the later Jain chroniclers portrayed him in a negative light. The early Jain chroniclers do not mention him as the murderer of Kumarapala. Moreover, Surathotsava by Someshvara (the priest of Ajayapala's son Bhima) suggests that Ajayapala was a son (not nephew) of Kumarapala.

Kumarapala's body was cremated, and his ashes were immersed at Prayag, at the confluence of Ganga and Yamuna. According to Someshvara's Surathotsava Mahakavya, his uncle and royal priest Sarva-deva II immersed the remains of Kumara-pala in Ganges.

== Administration ==
Three sons of Udayana, who is said to have helped Kumarapala during his early years, became highly influential and powerful politicians during Kumarapala's reign. These were Vagabhata, Amrabhata and Charubhata. Vagabhata-deva was made a minister, and a man named Āliga was made the chief of council (jyayana-pradhana).

The coins attributed to Kumarapala has his name on reverse and seated goddess, probably Lakshmi, on obverse.

== Religion ==
Kumarapala was born in a Shaivite family, but started patronizing Jainism at some point in life. The later Jain accounts portray him as the last great royal patron of Jainism, and as a righteous Jain king. During his reign, Jainism became prominent in Gujarat. It is not certain when exactly Kumarapala adopted the Jain faith. While several legendary chronicles state that he met the Jain scholar Hemachandra early in his life, the historical accuracy of this claim is doubtful.

According to Kumarapala's near-contemporary Somaprabha, the king used to hold religious meetings with Brahmins, but remained unsatisfied with their discussions. One day, his minister Vahada noticed this and told him about Hemachandra. The king requested a meeting with the Jain monk, who later converted him to Jainism. Hemachandra himself gives a similar account in his Mahavira-Charita. The later legendary accounts of Kumarapala's conversion to Jainism are too fanciful to be true. For example, Merutunga claims that Hemachandra made the god Shiva appear before Kumarapala at the Somanatha temple. Shiva told Kumarapala that Hemachandra was an incarnation of all the gods. On Hemachandra's advice, Kumarapala gave up the consumption of meat and wine. After return to his capital, Kumarapala took the twelve vows and became a Jain.

The Jain chronicles state that Kumarapala banned animal slaughter, alcohol, gambling and adultery after his conversion to Jainism. However, no extant inscriptions issued by the king announce any such ban. Two inscriptions issued by his feudatories ban animal slaughter on certain days of the month. These are the Ratanpur inscription and the 1152 CE Kiradu inscription.

Even after his conversion to Jainism, Kumarapala did not stop patronizing Shaivism. Hemachandra himself states that Kumarapala restored the temples of Shiva-Kedaranatha and Somanatha, and also erected the Kumareshvara temple after being told to do so by Shiva in a dream. Although Jain accounts unanimously state that Kumarapala converted to Jainism, none of the king's extant inscriptions invoke Jain deities. Most of his inscriptions began with invocations to Shiva. Even the Ratanpur inscription of his feudatory, which bans animal slaughter in accordance with Jain principles, begins with an invocation to Shankara (Shiva). The Kiradu inscription also states that Kumarapala achieved his conquests by the grace of Shankara. The 1169 CE Veraval prasasti inscription issued by the Shaivite priest Bhava Brihaspati describes Kumarapala as the leader of the rulers who worship Maheshvara (Shiva).

In view of these evidences, historian H. C. Ray theorizes that Kumarapala leaned towards Jainism because of financial considerations: he simply wanted to win over the support of rich Jain merchants, who controlled the economy of Gujarat. Historian Ashoke Kumar Majumdar criticizes this theory, arguing that the rich merchants in Gujarat probably became Jain after Kumarapala's conversion to Jainism, and because of his attempts to promote Jainism.

According to Hemachandra's Dvyashraya, Kumarapala began his day with blessings from the Brahmins and accepted a tilaka. Later in the day, he visited a Jain temple (named as Kumarapala-Vihara by a commentator). At the temple, he worshipped Parshvanatha. Thus, Hemachandra's writings indicate that Kumarapala did not give up Brahaminical rituals completely. However, the writings of the later Jain writers suggest that Kumarapala was completely devoted to Jainism. For example:

- Jina-Mandana states that Kumarapala stopped worshipping the Brahmanical idols.
- Somaprabha, writing around a decade after Kumarapala's death, claims that the king recited Jain mantras and the Pancha Namaskara prayer after waking up. After meditating and taking a bath, he worshipped Jain images. Time permitting, he visited the Kumarapala-Vihara and performed the Jain eight-fold worship there. After this, he visited Hemachandra and listen to his teachings. At noon, the king had lunch only after he offered food to the Jain deities. Next, he discussed religion and philosophy with an assembly of learned men, and then attended his court.

It is possible that Kumarapala gave up the Brahminical rituals during the last years of his life. Another possibility is that the later Jain writers made concerted attempts to falsely portray him as a completely devout Jain.

The Shaivite texts claim that Kumarapala converted back to Shaivism. For example, a Skanda Purana story states that Brahmins appealed to Hanuman for Kumarapala's re-conversion to Shaivism: a talisman given by Hanuman resulted in the destruction of Kumarapala's capital, and ultimately, his re-conversion. Gadadhara's Sampradaya Pradipa (1554) claims that Hemachandra was defeated in a debate and sentenced to death, after which Kumarapala became a Shaivite. Such stories, which appear to be imaginary, conceded that at some point, Kumarapala believed in Jainism.

== Constructions ==
The Vadnagar inscription (1152 CE) mentions that Kumarapala built the fort of Vadnagar. Jagaducharita mentions that he ordered a tank to be built at Bhadravati (Bhadreshwar). The stepwell at Vayad near Patan was built during Kumarapala's reign. Ganga stepwell at Wadhwan has been dated to 1169 CE (Samvat 1225).

=== Temples ===
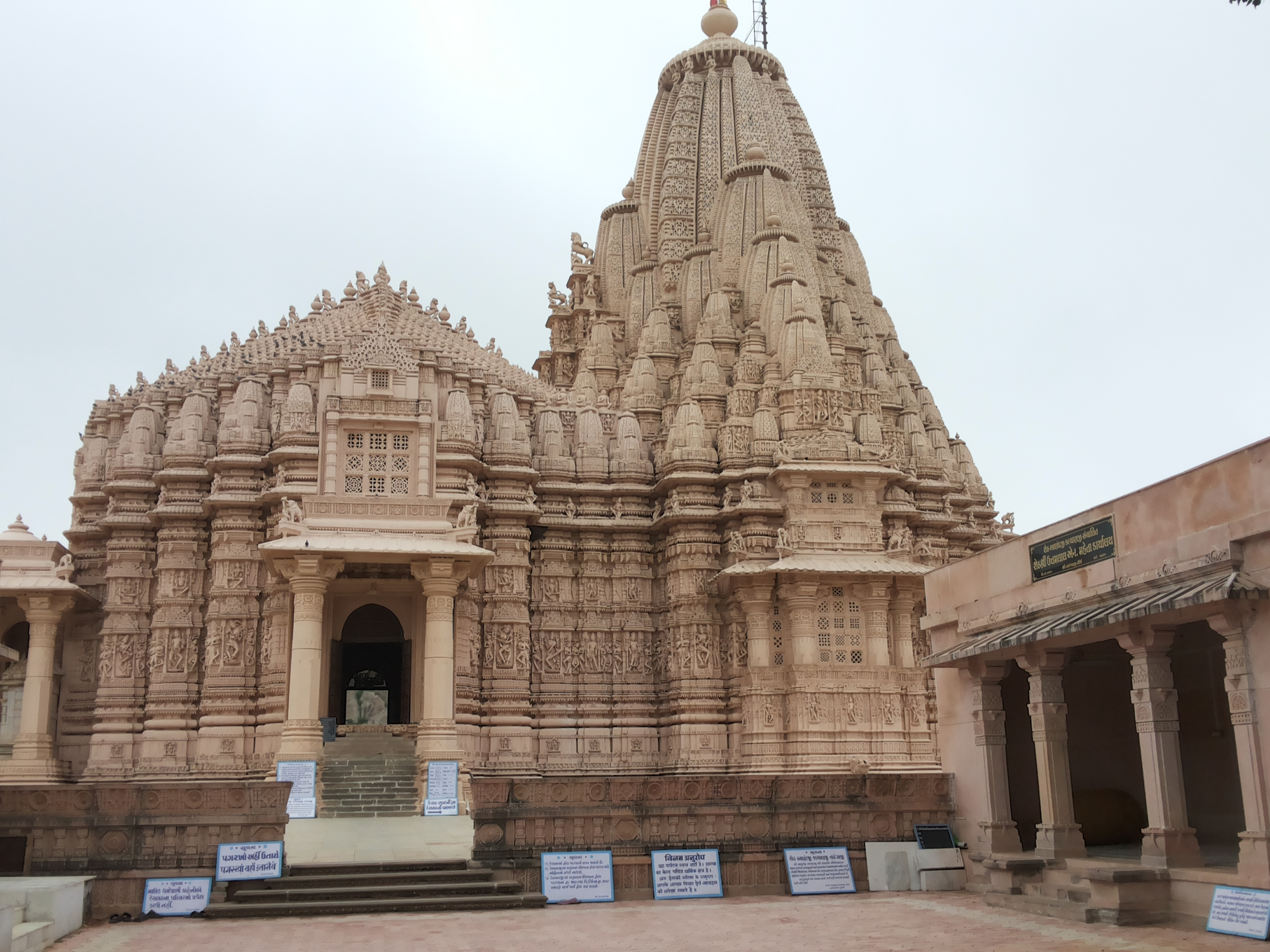
Taranga Jain temple in Gujarat, constructed by Kumarapala

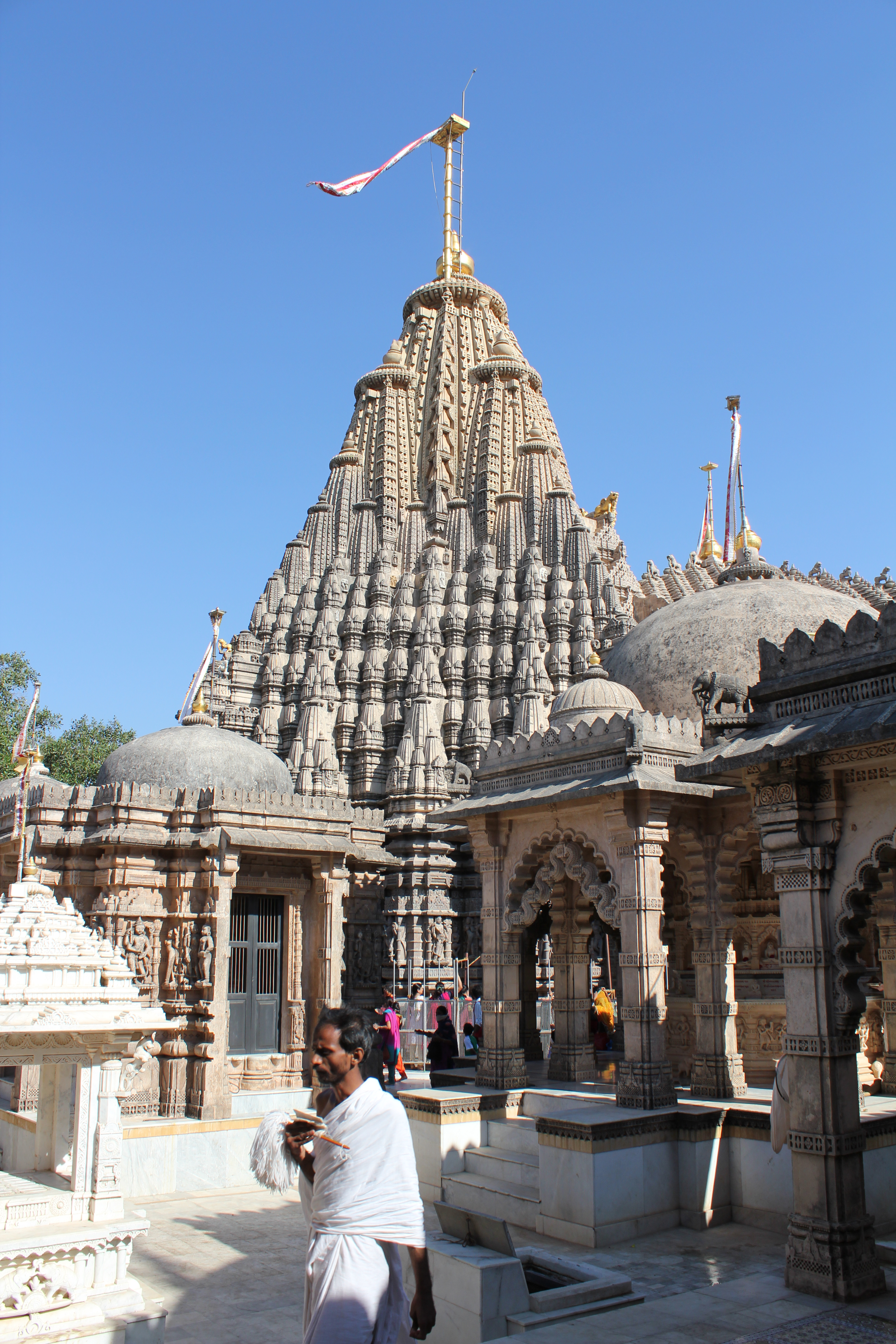
Adinath temple on Shatrunjaya

Kumarapala had constructed many temples; Brahminical temples as well as Jain temples due to his leaning towards it. According to the Jain texts, he was responsible for building a large number of temples in his capital Anahilapataka (modern Patan).

He built the temple at Somanatha in 1169 CE which the grandest and the most beautiful of his time. It's gudhamandapa (shrine proper) had the ceiling of about 34 1/2 feet which is the largest known in India. He built Kumarapaleshwar temple and renovated Kedareshwar temples at Anahilapataka (now Patan). He replaced Phase II Somnath Temple (Bhima II's temple) at Prabhas with large Kailash-Meru temple on the place. He also constructed Somnath Temple in Pali, Rajasthan.

According to Jain prabandhas, he built 32 Jain temples as the repentance of his non-vegetarianism in early life. This is mentioned in Yashapala's Mohaparajaya-nataka (VS 1229-32, 1173-76 CE) as well as in Prabhachandracharya's Prabhavakacharita (VS 1334, 1278 CE) and Merutunga's Prabandhachintamani (VS 1361, 1305 CE). Though it may be not be true explanation, he had constructed large number of temples himself or were constructed by his governors, administrators and officers.

He built Kumara-vihara dedicated to Parshwanath which had 24 devkulikas (shrines) in Anahilapataka. He built Trivihara and Tribhuvana-vihara (1160 CE) at Anahilapataka in merit of his father Tribhuvanpla which had 72 devkulikas and was dedicated to Neminatha. The large Ajitnatha temple at Taranga built by Kumarapala still survives while most of his other temples no longer exists. He also built temples at several sites, many of which are already Jain sites of pilgrimage: Shatrunjaya, Arbudagiri (Abu), Stambhatirtha (Khambhat), Prabhas (of Parshwanatha). He also built Kumaravihara at Tharapadra (Tharad), Iladurga (Idar), Jabaliputra (Jalore, 1165 CE), Dwipa (Diu), Latapalli (Ladol), Karkarapuri (Kakar), Mandali (Mandal) and Mangalpura (Mangrol). He built Jholika-vihara (1163 CE) at the birthplace of Hemachandra in Dhandhuka. Kumarapalapratibodha mentions his excavation of Jivantaswami Mahavira image from Vitabhayapura and its installation in the temple at Anahilapataka. Karmba-vihara, Yuka-vihara and the Mushaka-vihara are mentioned with a bizarre story in Prabandhachintamani, Puratan-prabandha-sangraha and Kumarapala-charitra-sangraha.

His Jain ministers built large number of temples. His minister Prithvipala built mandapa in front of the Vanrajavihara at Anahilapatak and the extant mandapa (c. 1150 CE) at the Vimala Temple on Mount Abu. He also built a mandapa the Ninnaya's temple built by his ancestor at Chandravati for the merits of his maternal grandmother. He also built Shantinath temple in Shayanvadapura in Rohamandal for the merits of his maternal grandfather. These two were between 1150-60. Minister Amrabhatta, son of Udayana, replaced old Shakunika-vihara at Bhrigukutch (Bharuch) with new grand temple. The relics of it are reused in extant Jami mosque at Bharuch. Minister Amarabhatta built Shakuni-chaitya (1166 CE) at Bhrigukutch (Bharuch) which was consecrated by Hemachandra. His brother Vagbhatta replaced old temple of Adinatha with new magnificent temple. Siddhapala, son of poet Shripala, built Siddhapala-vasati at Anahilapataka. Governor Muluka built Sahajigeshwara temple in 1146 CE in memory of his father, as mentioned in the inscription in Sodhli stepwell in Mangrol.

Anchalagaccha-pattavali mentions that Minister Vagbhatta built the Adinath temple (1155-1157 CE) on Shatrunjaya hill. On its foothill, he established the Vagbhattapura town and built Tribhuvana-vihara. Dholka inscription mentions that minister Vagbhatta added 24 devakulikas to Udayana-vihara (about 1167 CE) in Dholka. Dholka-prashasti mentions that Vairisimha, a friend or a relative of Minister Vagbhatta, built the Parshwanatha temple in Khambhat.

Kavi Vagbhatta who wrote Vagbhattalankara, built the Mahavira temple known as Undira-vasahika at Padra which was consecrated by Jinabhadrasuri. Minister Vadhuyana's son Kapardi built the Adinath temple at Vatesara. A mutilated Junagdh inscription mentions many temples built by Minister Dhavala.

The earliest extant temple of his period is small temple of Sarvamangala Devi at Khandoran. Other extant temples include Khandeshwari-mata Temple at Math near Kasangadh near Idar, the Mata temple (1146 CE) at Kanoda, the triple shrine at Parbadi in Saurashtra, Kumbheshwara Temple at Kumbhariya. The mandapa was added to Akhada Mahadeva temple at Vasai during his time. The temple at Galteshwar in Kheda district is a rare Bhumija style temple of Chalukyan style, devoid of any Paramara influence. There is a temple of Shashibhushana (c. 1169 CE) at Prabhas which is mentioned as one of five sacred temples of the town according to Prabhas-kanda. Kumarapala's Somanatha inscription mentions its renovation by Pashupatacharya Bhava Brihaspati. Some older parts of the temple still survives.
