= Alhanadeva =

King of Naddula from 1148 to 1163

King of Naddula
- Reign: c. 1148–1163 CE
- Predecessor: Katukaraja
- Successor: Kelhanadeva
- Dynasty: Chahamanas of Naddula
- Father: Asharaja

Alhana-deva (IAST: Alhaṇadeva, r. c. 1148–1163 CE) was an Indian king belonging to the Naddula Chahamana dynasty. He ruled the area around Naddula (present-day Nadol in Rajasthan), as a vassal of the Chaulukya king Kumarapala. During his reign, the Chahamanas of Shakambhari invaded Naddula, and Kumarapala replaced him with his own governors. Later, Kumarapala restored his rule in Naddula, as a result of his service in Chaulukya military campaigns.

== Reign ==
Alhanadeva was a son of the Chahamana monarch Asharaja. He succeeded his elder brother Katukaraja on the throne of Naddula. He accepted the suzerainty of the Chaulukya monarch Kumarapala. Another of his brothers, Purnapaksha, ruled the Ratanpur principality as Kumarapala's vassal.

Alhana commissioned a Shiva temple at Naddula, and also made donations to the Chandaleshvara and Tripurusha temples. His queen Shankaradevi installed an idol of the goddess Gauri with his benefaction. He also gave a monthly grant to the Mahavira Jain temple at Naddula.

=== Temporary loss of Naddula ===
While Alhanadeva was ruling at Naddula, the Shakambhari Chahamanas invaded the Chaulukya territories, including the Naddula Chahamana kingdom. According to the 1152 CE Kiradu inscription, Alhanadeva's rule was confined to the Kiratakupa (Kiradu), Latahrada (Gudamalani) and Shiva (Sheo) areas, which he had received as a favour from Kumarapala. Naddula was being ruled by Kumarapala's own governor Pratapasimha, as attested by an 1156 CE Nadol inscription. By 1159 CE, another Chaulukya governor ran the administration at Naddula. This governor is variously known as Vayajladeva, Vaijalladeva and Vaijaka in historical records. However, by 1161 CE, Kumarapala had restored Alhanadeva's rule in Naddula.

The reason for these changes at Naddula is not certain. Historian Dasharatha Sharma theorizes that the Shakambhari Chahamana king Arnoraja invaded and captured Naddula. Kumarapala defeated Arnoraja, and appointed his own governors at Naddula to ensure that the fort was well-defended. Later, Alhanadeva gained Kumarapala's confidence by performing well in his military campaigns. As a result, Kumarapala restored Naddula to Alhanadeva. A. K. Majumdar has a similar theory, but he believes that the invader was Arnoraja's successor Vigraharaja IV. Later, when Vigraharaja turned his attention away from Naddula as a result of his northern campaigns, Kumarapala reinstated Alhanadeva as the ruler of Naddula.

Historian R. B. Singh theorizes that when Arnoraja invaded the Chaulukya kingdom around 1150 CE, Alhanadeva joined him against Kumarapala. As a result, Kumarapala appointed his own governors at Naddula. This theory is based on a legend in the medieval chronicle Prabandha Kosha, which states that the Naddula Chahamana ruler allied with Arnoraja against Kumarapala (although the text wrongly names Arnoraja's contemporary at Naddula as Alhana's successor Kelhanadeva). This prompted Kumarapala to appoint his own governors at Naddula. However, later Alhanadeva came back to Kumarapala and supported him against the Shakambhari Chahamanas. As a result, he was given control of three districts (Kiratakupa, Latahrda and Shiva). Meanwhile, the control of Naddula remained in hands of Kumarapala's governors. Later, Alhanadeva pleased Kumarapala with his services in a southern campaign, as a result of which Kumarapala restored Alhanadeva's rule in Naddula. Later, Arnoraja's successor Vigraharaja subdued Alhanadeva.

=== Saurashtra expedition ===
The Sundha Hill inscription mentions that the Gurjara king (that is, Kumarapala) sought Alhanadeva's assistance in curbing disturbances in the hilly part of Saurashtra. The Nadol inscription of his descendant Kirtipala also states that Alhanadeva defeated the Saurashtrikas. The Kumarapala Charita chronicle suggests that this event happened in 1149 CE. According to Prabandha-Chintamani, Alhana killed the Abhira leader Sauṃsara (also called Saṃvara).

== Family ==
Alhanadeva had two queens: Analla-devi and Shankara-devi. Alhanadeva had a queen named Analla-devi, who was the daughter of one Sahula. The couple had three sons: Kelhanadeva, Gajasimha, and Kirtipala.

- Kelhanadeva assisted him in administration, and succeeded him on the throne of Naddula as a vassal of Kumarapala.
- Gajasimha administered the province of Mandavyapura (modern Mandore).
- Kirtipala was given a fief of 12 villages, and established a new kingdom at Javalipura (modern Jalore). His descendants — the Chahamanas of Javalipura — ruled until the 14th century.

In Nainsi ri Khyat, the 17th century chronicler Muhnot Nainsi names one Vijayasimha as a son of Alhana. Vijayasimha captured Satyapura (Sanchore) from the Dahiya Rajputs. There, he established a new kingdom, which his descendants ruled for around 250 years. According to historian Dasharatha Sharma, Vijayasimha's father Alhana may have been a different person.

Kumarasimha, titled Maharajaputra (prince) in a Bamnera inscription, may also have been a son of Alhana.
