= Kiradu temples =

Kiradu Temples
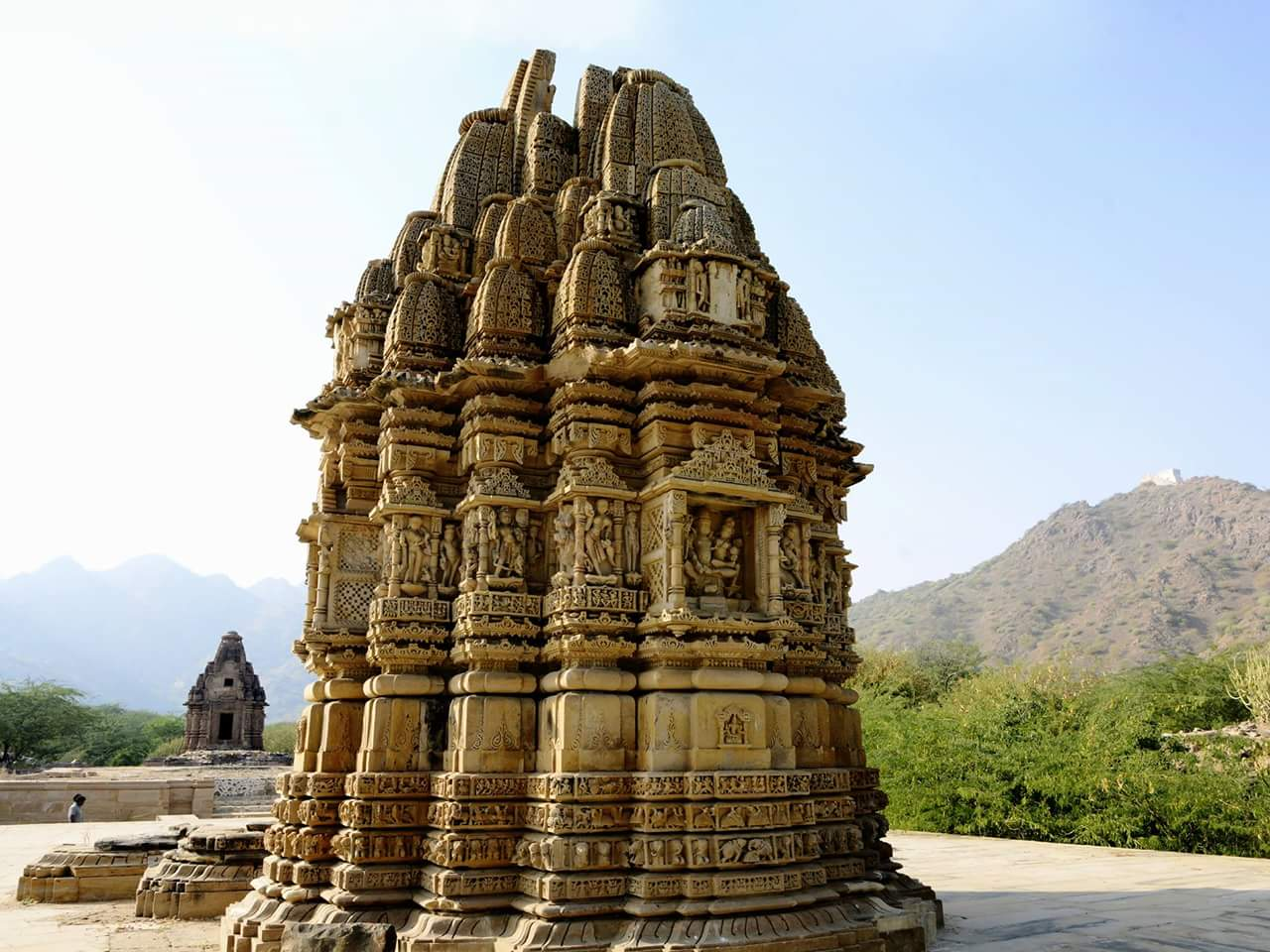
- Shiva temple at Kiradu, another behind

- Location in Barmer Rajasthan Kiradu temples (India)

Religion
- Affiliation: Hinduism
- District: Barmer
- Deity: Shiva

Location
- Location: Barmer
- State: Rajasthan
- Country: India
- Interactive map of Kiradu Temples
- Coordinates: 25.7528°N 71.0977°E

Architecture
- Temple: 5

The Kiradu temples are a group of ruined Hindu temples located in the Barmer district of Rajasthan, India. Kiradu town is located in the Thar Desert, about 35 km from Barmer and 157 km from Jaisalmer.

The ruins of at least five temples exist at Kiradu. Of these, the Someshvara temple, dedicated to Shiva, is the best-preserved structure. Epigraphic evidence suggests that the temples were constructed during the 11-12th century by the vassals of the Chalukya (Solanki) monarchs.

== The temples ==
The remains of at least five temples have been discovered at Kiradu. Of these, the Someshvara temple, nearest to the road, is in the most complete condition. Its surviving parts are sufficient to reconstruct the original temple design, although the shikhara has collapsed and the mandapa is missing most of its roof. The walls and columns are highly decorated with sculptures, including figures of animals and humans, which mostly remain in place. The mandapa columns form an octagonal shape. The art historian Percy Brown termed the architectural style as "Solanki mode". Today the style is more often called Māru-Gurjara architecture.

The Vishnu temple is at the other end of the group, with only the highly carved columns of the mandapa still standing; Michell dates this a century earlier. In between these two are three Shiva temples in varied condition, with mostly only the sanctuaries remaining, and a stepwell.

== History ==
Inscriptions dated 1153-1178 CE have been found at Kiradu. Based on this, Indian historian Gaurishankar Ojha assigned the temples to the 12th century CE. Art historians Ratna Chandra Agrawala and Stella Kramrisch have also dated the Someshvara temple to the 12th century. However, art historians Madhusudan Dhaky and Percy Brown dated the temple to the 11th century CE. More recently, Michell dates the Someshvara temple precisely to 1020, and the Vishnu temple to the early 10th century.

Kiradu was originally known as Kiratakupa. During the 12th century, it was controlled by several small dynasties, which ruled as vassals of the Chaulukyas. Someshvara, who belonged to a Paramara branch, rose to prominence in the 1140s CE after gaining favour of the Chaulukya rulers Jayasimha Siddharaja and Kumarapala.

In the 1150s, the Naddula Chahamana ruler Alhana (also a Chaulukya vassal) seems to have been appointed as a governor of Kiradu, as attested by an 1152 CE inscription. The area was restored to Someshvara by the 1160s. Sometime later, the Chaulukyas transferred the control of Kiradu to Madanabrahma, who came from a Chahamana family. Madanabrahma's successor was probably Asala, who was defeated by Alhana's son Kirtipala.

An 1178 CE Kiradu inscription, issued during the reign of the Chaulukya monarch Bhima II, records repairs to a temple damaged by the Turushkas (Turkic people). These Turushkas are identified with the Ghurids led by Muhammad of Ghor, who were defeated by the Chaulukya forces at the Battle of Kasahrada.

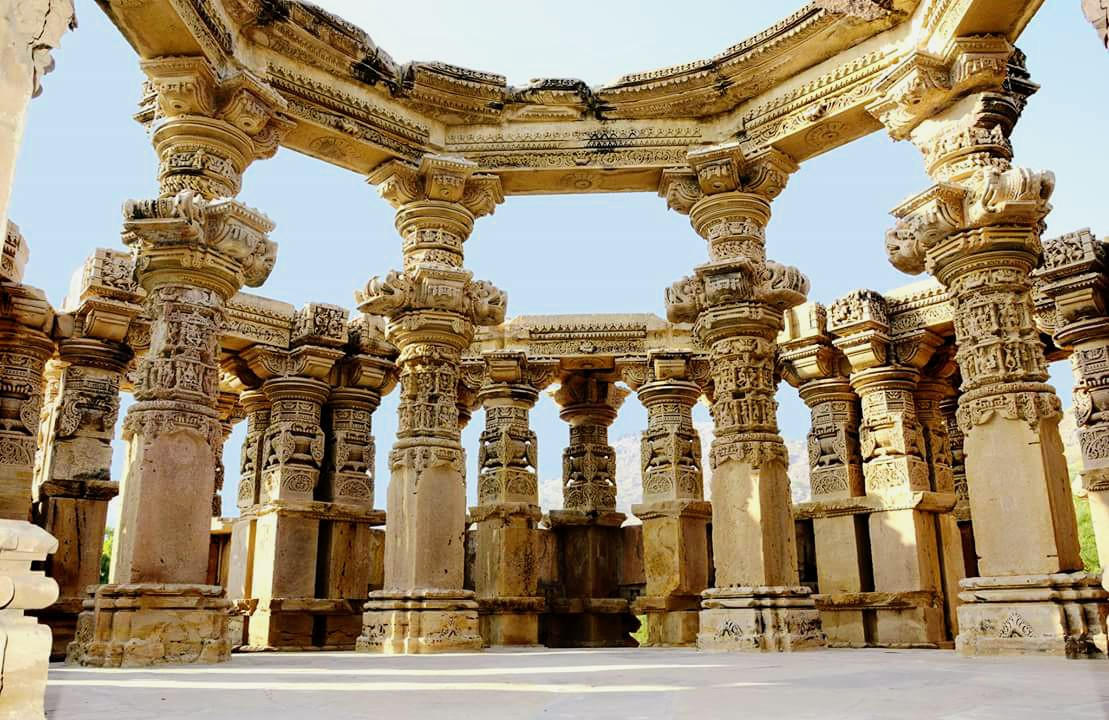
Vishnu temple mandapa

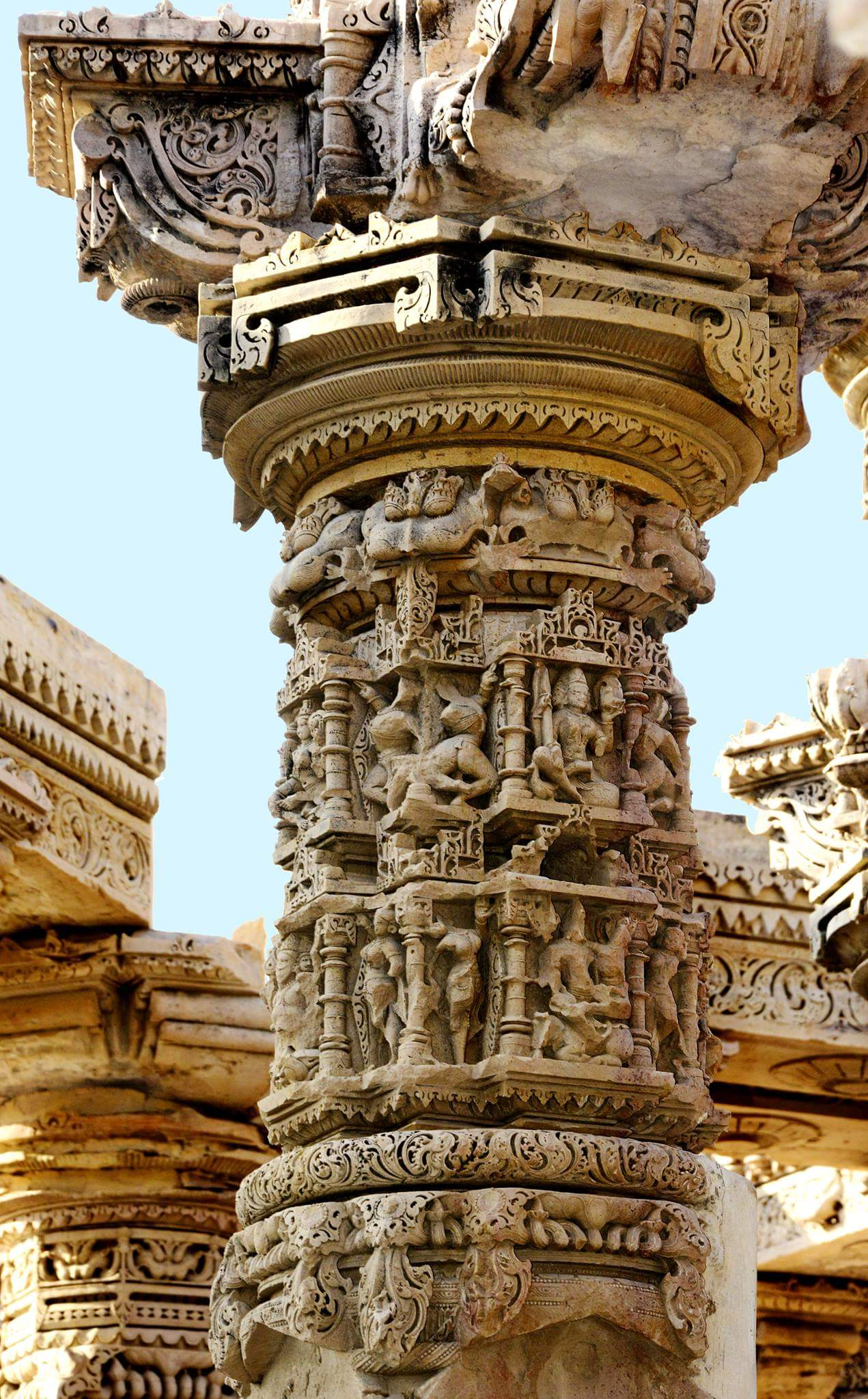
Mandapa pillar

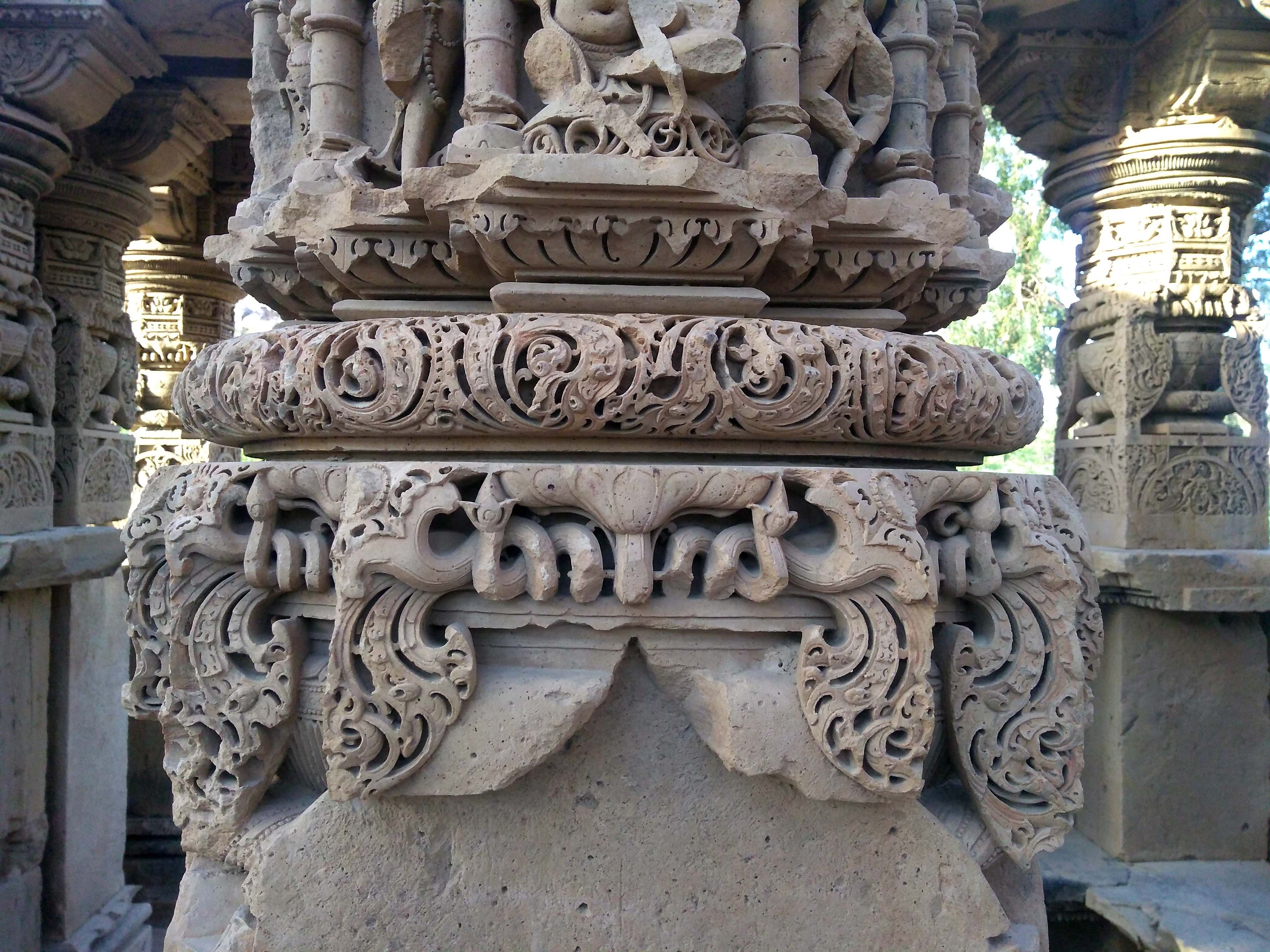
Pillar detail

Someshavara temple in 1897

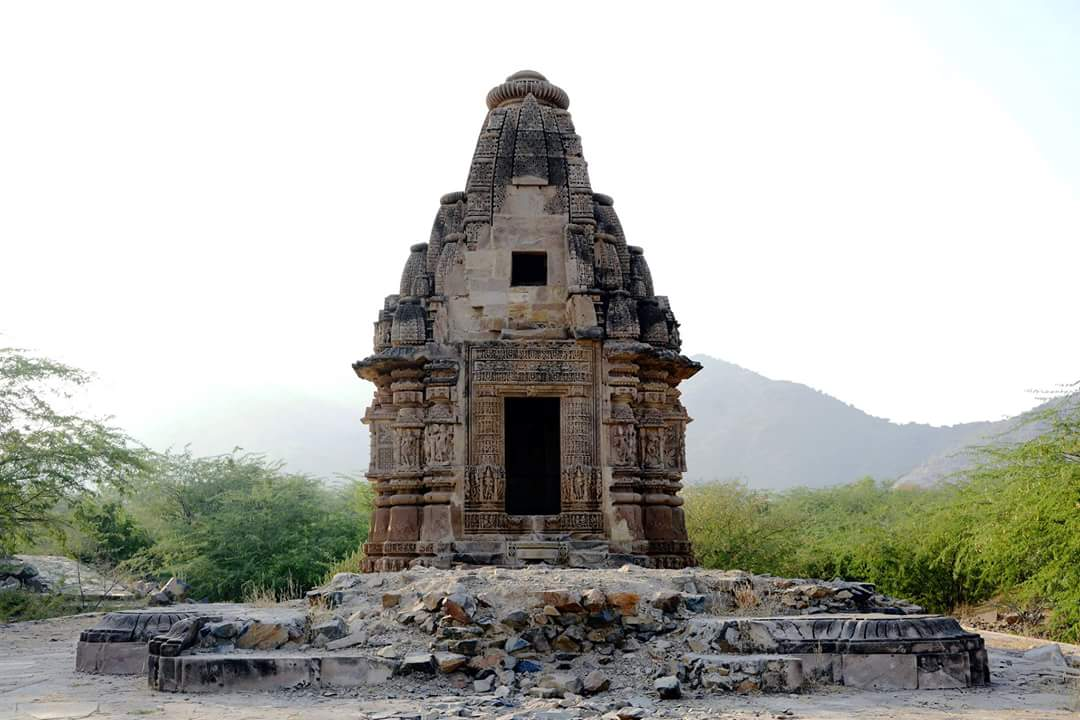
One of the Shiva temples
