= Ana Sagar Lake =

Lake in India

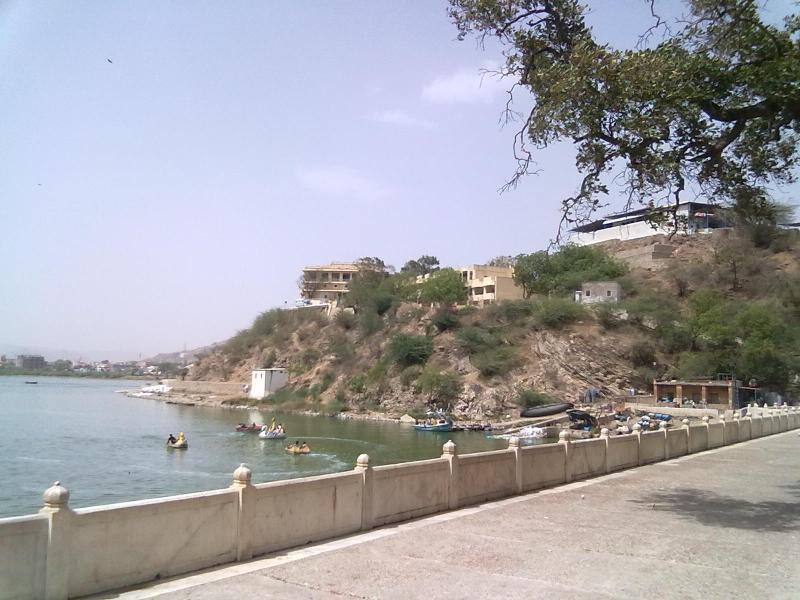
- The Anasāgar Lake

- Location within Rajasthan
- Interactive Map
- Location: Ajmer, Rajasthan, India
- Coordinates: 26.475°N 74.625°E
- Basin countries: India
- Max. depth: 4.4 m (14 ft)
- Water volume: 4,750,000 m^{3} (6,210,000 cu yd)

Ana Sagar Lake is an artificial lake situated in the city of Ajmer in Rajasthan state in India. It was built by Arnoraja (alias Ana), the grandfather of Prithviraj Chauhan, in 1135 -1150 AD and is named after him. The catchments were built with the help of local populace. The lake is spread over 13 km (8.1 mi).

== History ==
Arnoraj who ascended the throne a little before V.S. 1190 (1133 A.D.), has been glorified by the titles such as Maharajadhiraj Parmeshwara and Paramabhattaraka Maharajadhiraj Shrimad Arnorajdeva. Early in his reign, Arnoraj inflicted a crushing defeat upon the Turuskas who, had come upto Pushkar. The long march through the desert had exhausted the invaders and they were so thoroughly beaten that according to a Chauhan Prashasti, the land of Ajmer was soaked with their blood. On the plain where the battle was fought, Arnoraj constructed Anasagar lake and filled it with river Chandra, identified by H.C Ray with Luni which “takes its rise in the Sambhar lake and flows by Pushkar. Sarda identifies it with Bandi river which in its lower reaches is called Luni.

Mughal Emperor Jahangir constructed Daulat Bagh garden beside the lake. Shah Jahan constructed five pavilions (known as Baradari) between the garden and the lake.

== Details ==
There is a Circuit house on a hill near the lake that used to be Lodha’s Residency. This is one of the main tourist attraction there. An island in the center of the lake is accessible by boat. Boats could be hired from the east side of the Daulat Bagh. The walkways Chowpatty and Jetty next to each other and Baradari give opportunity to capture the scenic of the lake. The lake is the biggest one in Ajmer, with the maximum catchments area (5 km^{2} (1.9 sq mi) built up area). The maximum depth of lake is 4.4 m (14 ft) with storage capacity of 4,750,000 m^{3} (6,210,000 cu yd). The Rajasthan High Court has banned construction in the catchment areas of the lake basins.

=== Rishi Udyan ===
Dayananda Saraswati, who died at Bhinai Kothi near Ajmer, his ashes were scattered at Ajmer in Rishi Udyan as per his wishes, which is located on the bank of the Ana Sagar Lake and makes an excellent sunset point. Rishi Udyan has a functional Arya Samaj temple with daily morning and evening yajna homa, where an annual three day Aruasamaj melā is held every year on Rishi Dayanand's death anniversary at the end of October, which also entails vedic seminars, vedas memorisation competition, yajna, and Dhavaja Rohan flag march. It is organised by the Paropkarini Sabha, which was founded by Swami Dayanand Saraswati on 16 August 1880 in Meerut, registered in Ajmer on 27 February 1883, and since 1893 has been operating from its office in Ajmer.

== Recent legal and environmental actions (2023–2025) ==
In 2023–2025, Ana Sagar Lake and its surrounding green-belt/wetland buffers were the subject of sustained litigation and court-monitored compliance concerning structures raised under Ajmer Smart City projects (including a “Seven Wonders Park”, a food court at Luv-Kush Garden, portions of Gandhi Smriti Udyan/Azad Park, and pathways). The proceedings were triggered by petitions before the National Green Tribunal (NGT) filed by Ajmer-based environmental activist and BJP's former municipal councillor Ashok Malik, alleging violations of wetland safeguards and the city master plan.

In August–September 2023, the NGT (Central Zonal Bench, Bhopal) directed demolition/removal of structures raised in the green belt/open space around the lake and sought compliance reports from the district administration and municipal corporation.

The State of Rajasthan appealed to the Supreme Court in a matter captioned State of Rajasthan & Others v. Ashok Malik & Others. On 18 March 2025, a bench led by Justice Abhay S. Oka directed the State to remove encroachments on wetland portions forming part of the Seven Wonders Park and to clear the Luv-Kush Garden food court within six months, observing that destruction of wetlands is “an invitation to disaster.”

On 17 May 2025, the Court recorded/approved a proposal to create two compensatory wetlands near Ajmer—about 12 ha at Foy Sagar (Varun Sagar) extension and 10 ha at Tabiji-1—and reiterated demolition timelines. It permitted retention of certain lakeside walkways and of Gandhi Smriti Udyan (as outside the wetland boundary) while insisting that the replicas and the food court be removed and ecological restoration undertaken.

Demolition and compliance. Action began in March 2025 and accelerated in September 2025 ahead of the court deadline, with the administration commencing demolition of the replicas and steps against the Luv-Kush Garden food court pursuant to the Supreme Court’s directions.

Public debate. Coverage situated these actions within wider debates on Smart City spending and environmental planning; outlets also quoted Malik on ecological costs and accountability in Ajmer.

== Gallery ==
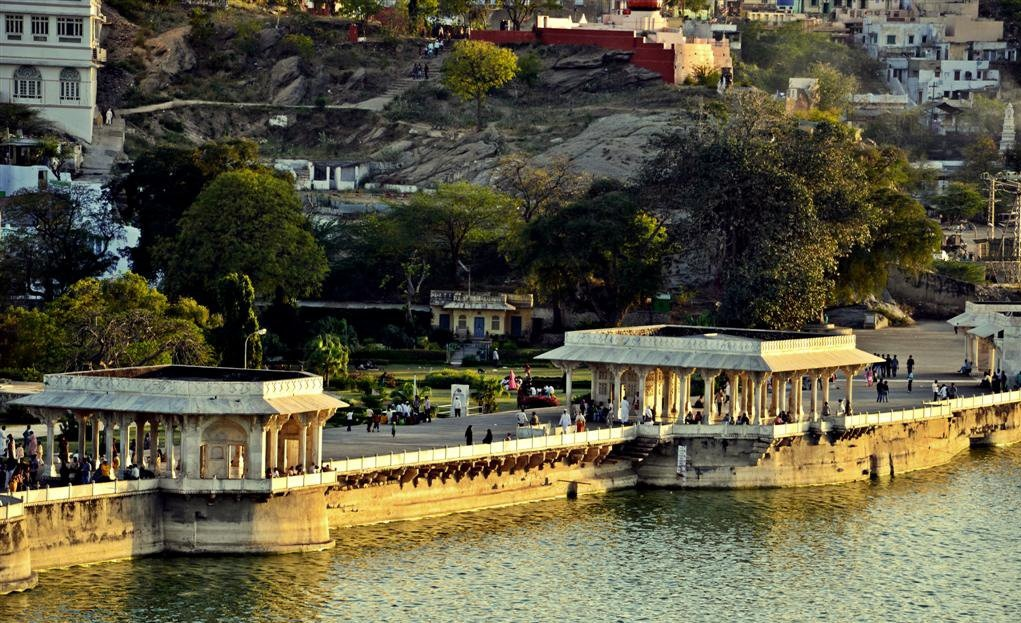
Baradari (pavilions) on Lake Anasagar

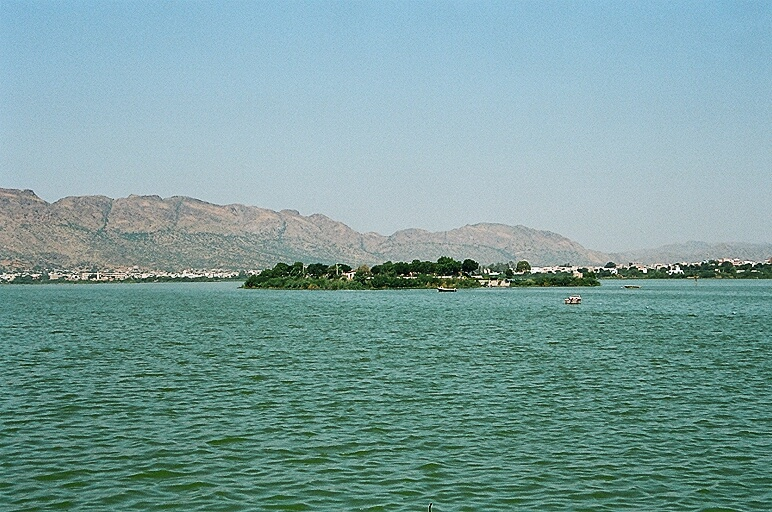
ARV Group's island; the only island in the lake

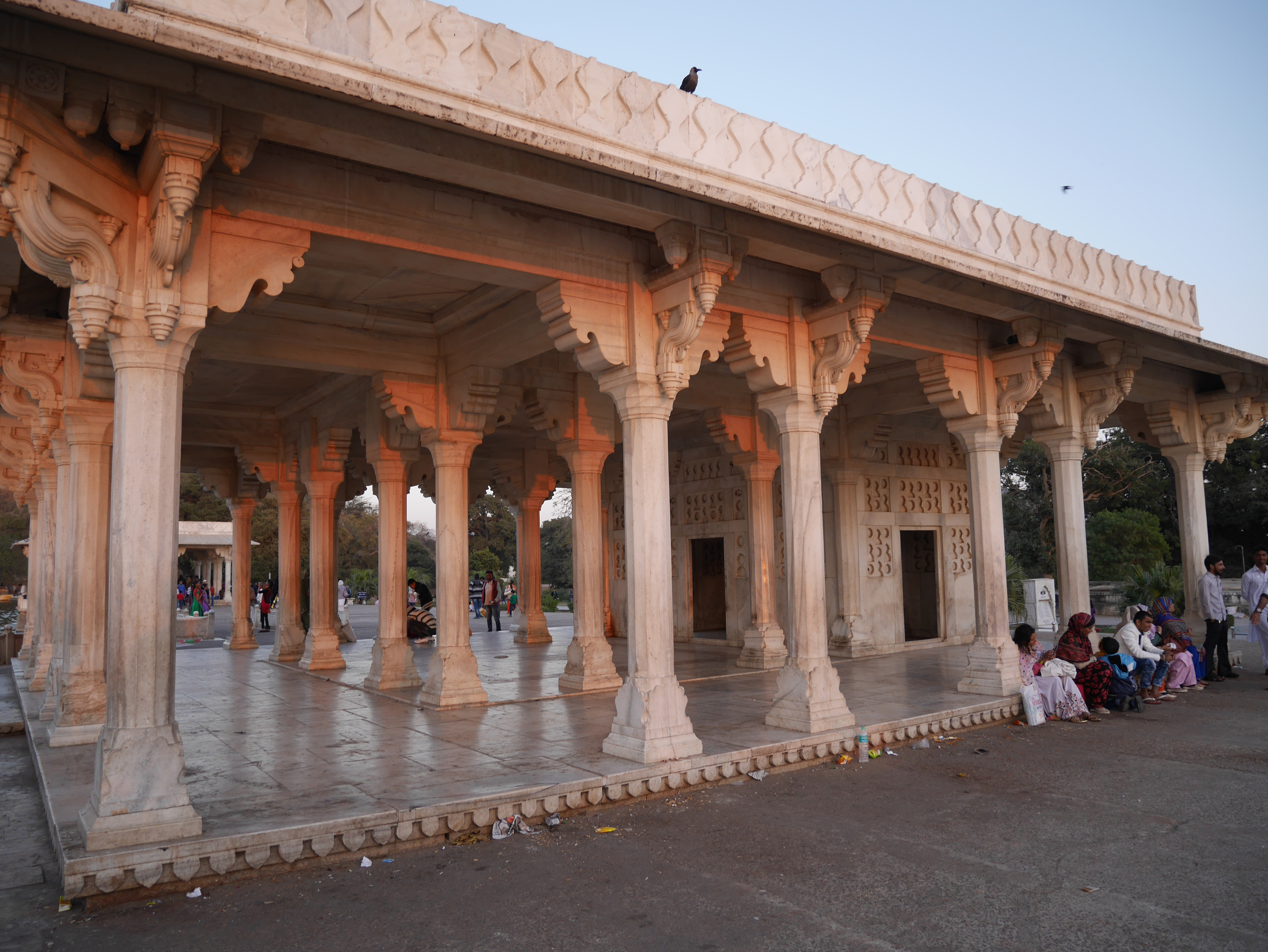
Details of the columns of the pavilion

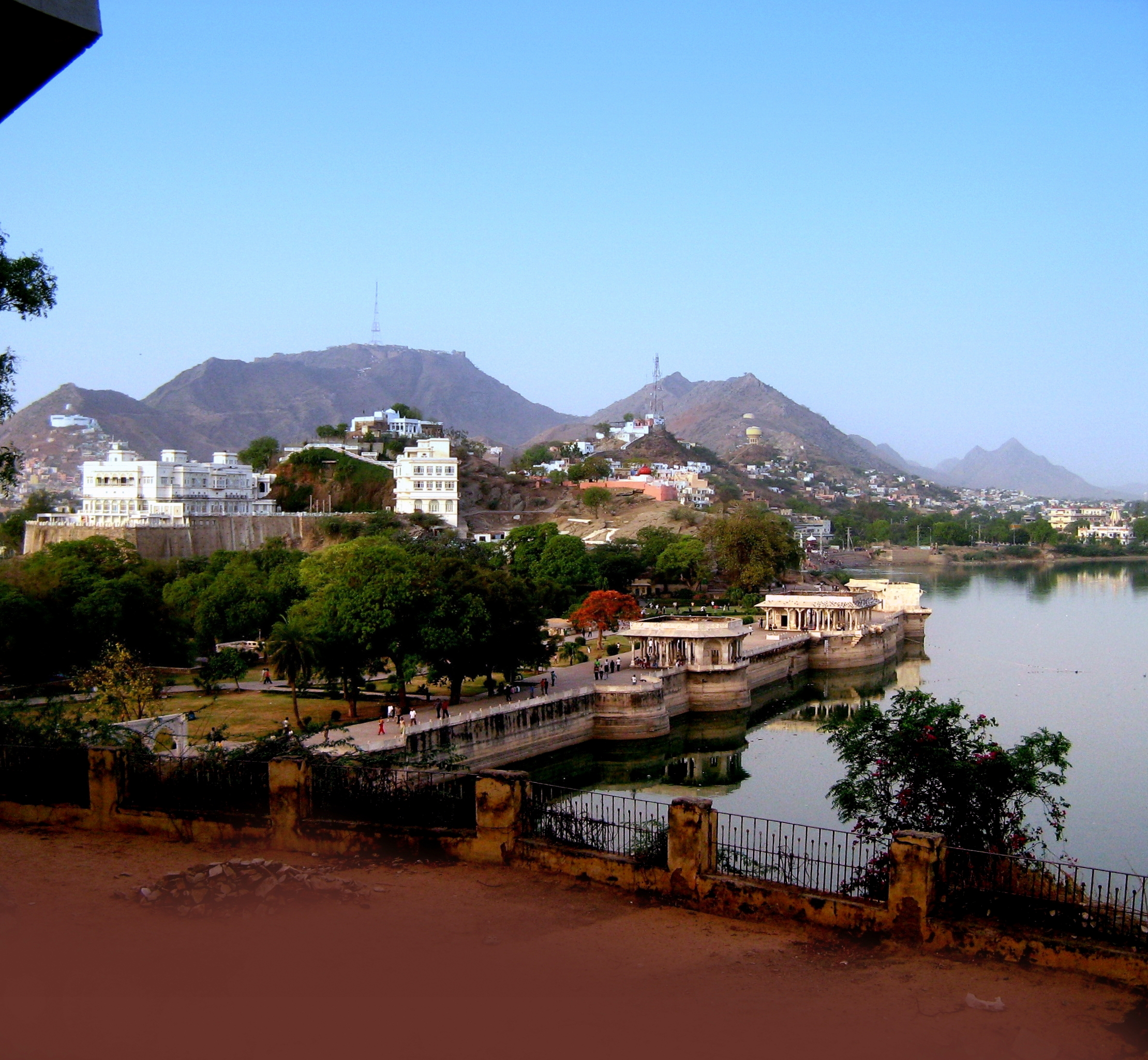
Ajmer city as seen from the lake

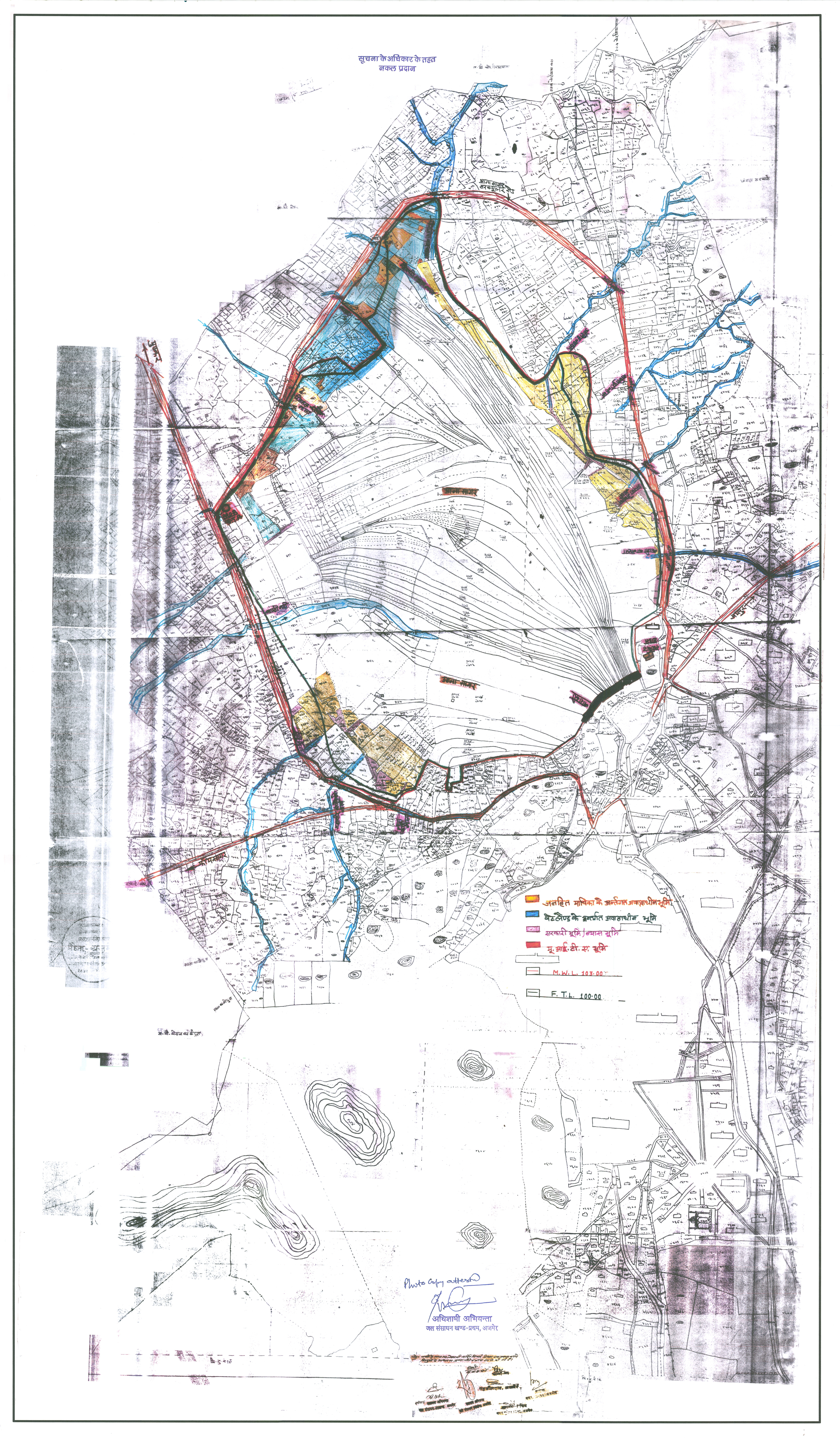
Wetland Map of Anasagar Lake made in the year 2013

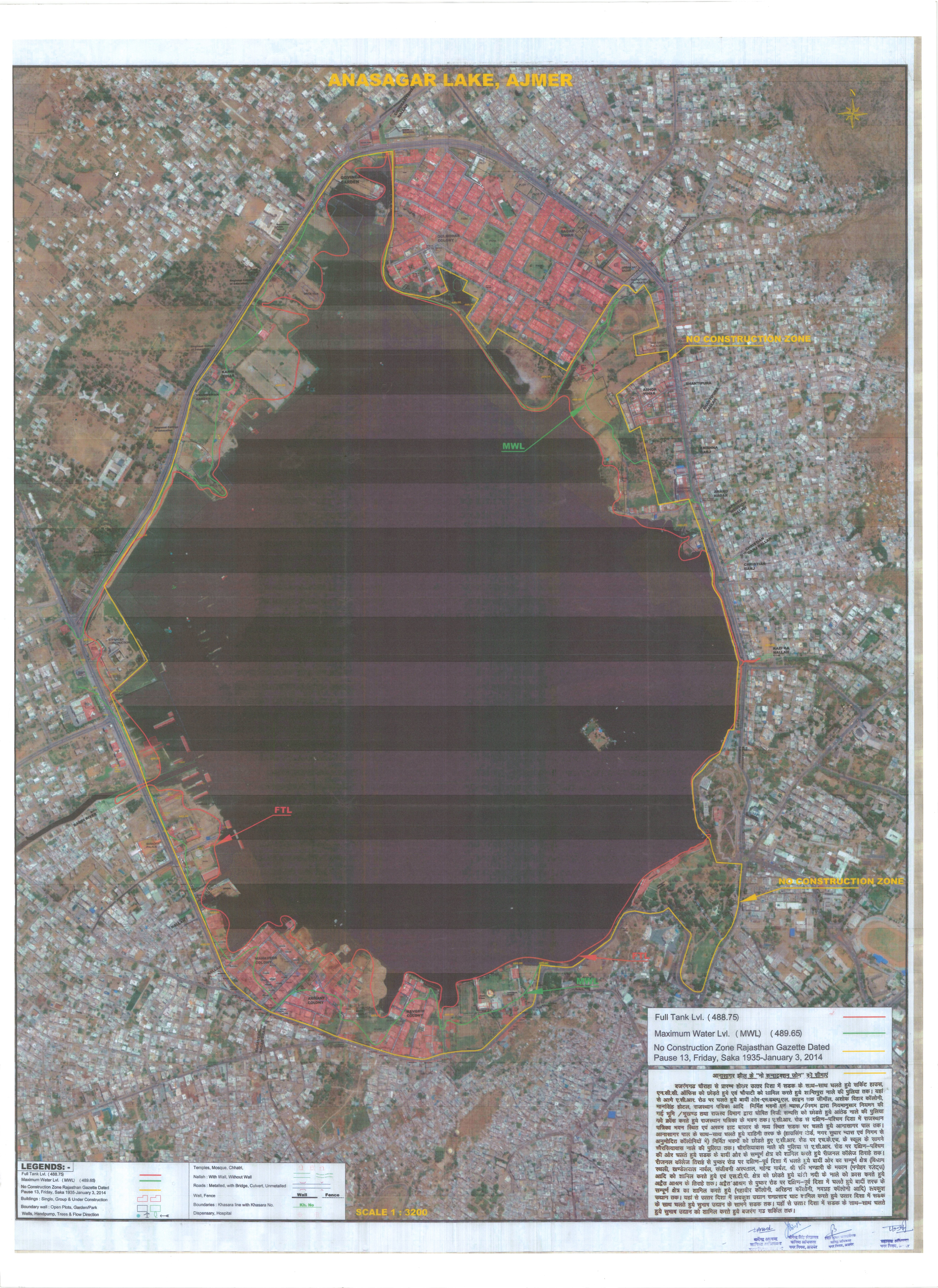
Anasagar Lake No Construction Zone Map

== See also ==
- List of lakes in India
