= Ratnapala (Chahamana dynasty) =

King of Naddula from 1119 to 1132

- Maharajadhiraja

King of Naddula
- Reign: c. 1119–1132 CE
- Predecessor: Asharaja
- Successor: Rayapala
- Dynasty: Chahamanas of Naddula
- Father: Prithvipala

Ratna-pala (IAST: Ratnapāla, r. c. 1119–1132 CE) was an Indian king belonging to the Naddula Chahamana dynasty. He ruled the area around Naddula (present-day Nadol in Rajasthan). He seized the throne of Naddula from his uncle Asharaja, who had become the Chahamana king after his father's death.

== Reign ==
Ratnapala was the son of the Chahamana king Prithvipala. He was probably born after Prithvipala's death, or he was a minor at the time of his father's death. Because of this, Prithvipala was succeeded by his brothers Jojalladeva and Asharaja. Asharaja controlled the throne of Naddula at least until 1115 CE. An inscription states that one of his relatives captured Mandore, and Asharaja recaptured it. This relative was probably Ratnapala, who was trying to wrest control of the kingdom.

By 1119 CE, Ratnapala had become the Chahamana king (Maharajadhiraja), as attested by a Sewari inscription. Ratnapala probably forcibly dislodged Asharaja, because of which Asharaja joined the rival Chaulukya king Jayasimha Siddharaja.

Ratnapala's 1119 CE Sewari inscription, issued from his camp at Nahura, records the grant of the Gumda Kurchcha (modern Gondoch in Pali district) to Brahmins. Another inscription records his grant of the Riyasakudapa village to the Tripurushadeva temple.

Ratnapala was succeeded by his son Rayapala.
