= Jagaddeva (Chahamana dynasty) =

King of Sapadalaksha
- Reign: c. 1150
- Predecessor: Arnoraja
- Successor: Vigraharaja IV
- Dynasty: Chahamanas of Shakambhari

Jagaddeva (r. c. 1150) was an Indian king belonging to the Shakambhari Chahamana dynasty. He ruled the Sapadalaksha country, which included parts of present-day Rajasthan in north-western India. He ascended the throne after killing his father Arnoraja, and ruled briefly before being dethroned by his brother Vigraharaja IV.

== Reign ==
Jagaddeva was one of the three sons born to the Chahamana king Arnoraja and his queen Sudhava, who was a princess of Marwar. His two brothers were Vigraharaja IV and Devadatta. The Prithviraja Vijaya states that the eldest son of Sudhava meted out the same treatment to Arnoraja that Parashurama had meted out to his mother (that is, killed the parent). The text does not name this son, but names Arnoraja's successor as Vigraharaja IV, who had good qualities (sattva guṇa). Other texts, such as Hammira Mahakavya, Prabandha Kosha and Surjana Charita name Arnoraja's successor as Jagaddeva. This indicates that Jagaddeva ascended the Chahamana throne after killing his father.

Before Jagaddeva could consolidate his position, his younger brother Vigraharaja dethroned him and became the new Chahamana king. The Prithviraja Vijaya describes Jagaddeva as the only Chahamana ruler who did not attain heaven.
