= Ajayaraja II =

King of Sapadalaksha
- Reign: c. 1110–1135 CE
- Predecessor: Prithviraja I
- Successor: Arnoraja
- Co-ruler: Somalladevi
- Spouse: Somalladevi
- Issue: Arnoraja
- Dynasty: Chahamanas of Shakambhari
- Father: Prithviraja I

Ajayaraja II (r. c. 1110–1135 CE) was an Indian king belonging to the Shakambhari Chahamana dynasty. He ruled the Sapadalaksha country, which included parts of present-day Rajasthan in north-western India. He defeated the Paramaras of Malwa, and also repulsed the Ghaznavid invasions after losing some part of his territory to them. The establishment of the Ajmer city is attributed to him.

== Early life ==
Ajayaraja succeeded his father Prithviraja I on the Chahamana throne. He was also known as Salhana. The Prabandha Kosha and Hammira Mahakavya call him Alhana, which appears to be a variant of Salhana.

He married Somalladevi, who is also known as Somaladevi, Somalekha or Somelekha.

== Establishment of Ajmer ==
The 12th-century text Prithviraja Vijaya states that Ajayaraja II established the city of Ajayameru (modern Ajmer). Historian Dasharatha Sharma notes that the earliest mention of the city's name occurs in Palha's Pattavali, which was copied in 1113 CE (1170 VS) at Dhara. This suggests that Ajmer was founded sometime before 1113 CE. A prashasti (eulogistic inscription) issued by Vigraharaja IV found at Adhai Din Ka Jhonpra states Ajayaraja II (Ajayadeva) moved his residence to Ajmer.

The later text Prabandha-Kosha states that it was the 8th-century king Ajayaraja I who commissioned the Ajayameru fort, which later came to be known as the Taragarh fort of Ajmer. According to historian R. B. Singh, Ajayaraja I probably founded the city, as inscriptions dated to the 8th century CE have been found there. Singh theorizes that Ajayaraja II later enlarged the town, constructed palaces, and moved the Chahamana capital from Shakambhari to Ajmer.

== Military career ==
=== Paramaras ===
The Paramara dynasty of Malwa had been weakened because of invasions from the Gujarat Chaulukya king Jayasimha Siddharaja. Taking advantage of this, Ajayaraja seems to have expanded the Chahamana kingdom by capturing the Paramara territory. Ajayaraja defeated Sulhana (or Sollana), who was probably a commander of the Paramara king Naravarman According to the Bijolia rock inscription, Sulhana was a dandanayaka or general (the Prithviraja Vijaya names Sulhana as the king of Malwa, but there was no Paramara king by that name). The inscription states that Sulhana was captured in the battle, tied up to the back of a camel, and brought to the Chahamana capital Ajmer. An inscription found at Adhai Din Ka Jhonpra in Ajmer boasts that Ajayaraja conquered the territory up to Ujjain after defeating the ruler of Malwa.

=== Chachchiga, Simdhala and Yashoraja ===
The Bijolia rock inscription states that Ajayaraja killed three heroes named Chachchiga, Simdhala and Yashoraja, who were from Shrimarga-durdda. The identity of these rulers and localities are not certain, but these people were probably local chiefs who owed allegiance to a neighbouring king.

Some scholars such as Akshay Kirti Vyas believe that Shrimarga and Durdda were two distinct localities. John Faithfull Fleet identified Shrimarga with modern Bayana. A. K. Vyas and R. B. Singh identified Durdda with modern Dudhai (in Madhya Pradesh) on the basis of similar-sounding names. These places are located to the east of the traditional Chahamana territory, which suggests that Ajayaraja made an attempt to expand the kingdom's boundaries eastwards. According to Singh, this theory is also corroborated by the discovery of his coins in Mathura.

Historian Dasharatha Sharma disagrees with this theory. According to him, Bayana was not part of the Chahamana kingdom even in the late 12th century: it was controlled by the ruling dynasty of Tribhuvanagiri, who were ultimately defeated by Muhammad of Ghor. Similarly, the phonetic association of Dudhai with Durdda is not justified. This area was under Chandela control, and there is no evidence of Ajayaraja having conquered it. Had Ajayaraja conquered such distant territories by defeating the local dynasties, this achievement would have been mentioned in the Chahamana inscriptions and the Prithviraja Vijaya. Moreover, Bayana and Dudhai are two distinct, distant places; the Bijolia inscription suggests that the three chiefs came from one locality. According to Sharma, it is possible that durdda is an error for durga (lit. 'fort'). This means that these three chiefs were defenders of a fort named Shrimarga. The inscription states that Ajayaraja defeated the three chiefs before defeating the Malwa general. Sharma, therefore, theorized that Ajayaraja defeated the three warriors during his Malwa campaign.

=== Ghaznavids ===
The Prithviraja-Vijaya states that Ajayaraja defeated the Garjana Matangas ("Ghazna Muslims"). The Prabandha Kosha also claims that Ajayaraja defeated "Sahavadina" (Sanskritized form of Shahab-ud-Din). This probably refers to his repulsion of invasions by Ghaznavid generals. The 13th century Muslim historian Minhaj-i-Siraj states that the Ghaznavid ruler Bahram Shah made several expeditions to India during this time.

According to Mihaj-i-Siraj's Tabaqat-i Nasiri and Firishta's Tarikh-i-Firishta, Muhammad Bahlim (Bahram Shah's governor in India) had captured the Nagaur fort. Nagaur was under Ajayaraja's control at least until 1121 CE, as attested by Prabhavaka Charita (the text calls him Alhadana, which appears to be a Sanskritized form of his alias Alhana). This suggests that Ajayaraja lost some of his territory to the Ghaznavids. After Bahlim died, Salar Hussain succeeded him as the governor of Ghaznavid territories in India. Ajayraja's victory over the Garjana Matangas was probably the repulsion of a raid by either Bahlim or Salar Hussain.

== Last years ==
The prashasti found at the Adhai Din Ka Jhonpra states that Ajayaraja appointed his son Arnoraja as his successor. He then retired to the forest beside the Pushkar lake.

== Religion ==
According to Prithviraja Vijaya, Ajayaraja was a devotee of Shiva. The Devasuri-Charita (in Prabhavaka Charita) suggests that he was also tolerant towards Vaishnavites and Jains. The Kharatara-Gachchha-Pattavali, a Sanskrit text containing biographies of the Kharatara Jain monks, indicates that he allowed Jains to build temples in his new capital Ajayameru (Ajmer). He also donated a golden kalasha to a Parshvanatha temple. Raviprabha Suri's Dharmaghosha-Stuti mentions that he was the judge of a debate between the Śvetāmbara monk Dharmaghosha Suri and the Digambara monk Gunachandra.

== Coinage ==
Prithviraja Vijaya states that Ajayaraja "filled the earth" with so many silver coins (rupakas), that he took away the fame of other kings. An inscription at the Ruthi Rani temple at Dhod suggests that these coins were in use at least until the reign of his grandson Someshvara. Ajayaraja's silver coins have been found at many places, including Rajasthan and Mathura. These coins feature a seated goddess on one side, and the legend "Shri Ajayadeva" on the other side.

In his own lifetime, his queen Somalladevi issued her coins not as a dowager queen or regent but as a regnant queen. The Prithviraja Vijaya also mentions that his queen Somelekha had new silver coins every day. Somelekha or Somalekha appears to be a variant of Somalladevi, which was the name of Ajayaraja's queen according to the Bijolia rock inscription. Some rare silver coins featuring a king's head and the legend "Shri Somaladevi" (or "Shri Somalladevi") in Nagari script have been discovered. Copper coins featuring the same legend with the image of a horseman have also been found. These are among the few coins issued by Indian queens.
