= Arnoraja =

- Maharajadhiraja-Parameshvara

King of Sapadalaksha
- Reign: c. 1135–1150 CE
- Predecessor: Ajayaraja II
- Successor: Jagaddeva
- Consort: Kanchana-devi
- Issue: Jagaddeva
- Dynasty: Chahamanas of Shakambhari
- Father: Ajayaraja II
- Mother: Somalladevi

Arnoraja (IAST: Arṇorāja, r. c. 1135–1150 CE) was an Indian king belonging to the Shakambhari Chahamana dynasty. He ruled the Sapadalaksha country, which included parts of present-day Rajasthan in north-western India. Arnoraja defeated the Ghaznavid king Bahram Shah in the near Ajmer, and also defeated several neighbouring Hindu kings including the Paramaras and the Tomaras. He had to face defeats against the Chaulukyas, and was ultimately killed by his own son, Jagaddeva.

== Early life ==
Arnoraja was a son of the Chahamana king Ajayaraja II and his wife Somalladevi. He is known by various names, including Analadeva, Ānaladeva, Ana, Anna, and Ānāka. Two 1139 CE Revasa inscriptions mention his title as Maharajadhiraja-Parameshvara. An 1141 CE manuscript of Avashyaka-Niryukti mentions his title as Paramabhattaraka-Maharajadhiraja-Shrimad.

== Military career ==
=== Paramaras ===
The Bijolia rock inscription boasts that Arnoraja humiliated Nirvvana-Naryana, which was an epithet of the Paramara ruler Naravarman. Arnoraja's father Ajayaraja II had defeated Naravarman, so this incident may have taken place when Arnoraja was a prince.

The Ajmer prashasti (eulogy) inscription also begins with a mention of Naravarman, but the verse is incomplete. Four lines later, it states that Arnoraja's warriors captured the elephants of the Malwa king (Malavesha). Historian Dasharatha Sharma believes that this king of Malwa was Naravarman. According to R. B. Singh, this probably refers to Arnoraja's military success against Naravarman's successor Yashovarman.

=== Tomaras ===
The Ajmer prashasti inscription also states that Arnoraja's soldiers marched to Haritanaka (modern Haryana). Their invasion rendered the waters of the Kalindi river muddy, and caused the women of that country to shed tears. This appears to be a reference to Arnoraja's invasion of the Tomara kingdom. Arnoraja seems to have defeated the Tomaras, but this victory was not decisive, as his son Vigraharaja IV also had to fight against the Tomaras.

=== Turushkas ===
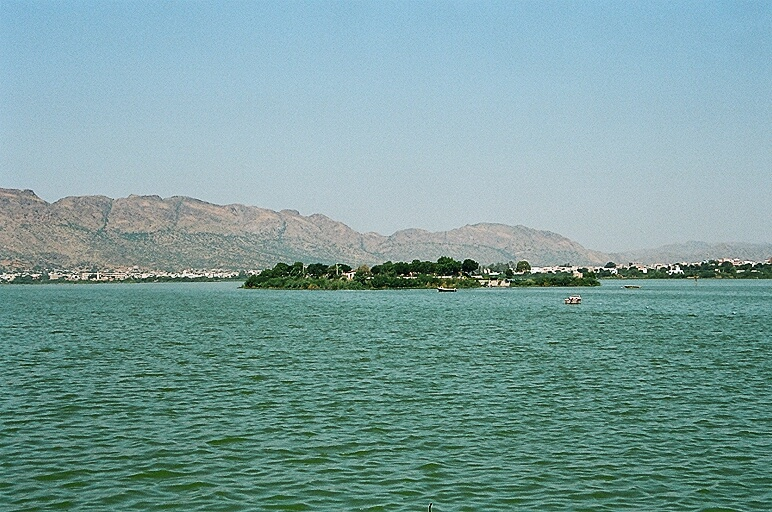
The Ana Sagar lake in Ajmer is named after Arnoraja alias Ana

Arnoraja defeated the Ghaznavid king Bahram Shah in the Slaughter of Turushkas near Ajmer. According to the Ajmer prashasti inscription Arnoraja adorned Ajmer with the blood of Turushkas (Turkic people). The Prithviraja Vijaya also states that Arnoraja repulsed a Muslim invasion. According to the text, these invaders came through the desert, and had to drink the blood of their horses in absence of water. After defeating these invaders, Arnoraja purified the place of their death by commissioning a lake, which is identified with the modern Ana Sagar. The lake was filled with the water of the Chandra river, identified with the modern Bandi River.

Historian H. C. Ray theorized that the Muslim invaders defeated by Arnoraja were the Yamini (Ghaznavid) generals of Lahore. However, R. B. Singh identifies the invader as the Ghaznavid king Bahram Shah himself. The 13th century Muslim chronicle Tabaqat-i Nasiri states that a chief named Muhammad Bahalim once revolted against Bahram Shah. Bahalim is said to have built the Nagaur fort. Bahram Shah marched towards India to defeat Bahalim, who also set out from Nagaur with his army. The two armies met at Multan, where Bahalim was defeated and killed. Bahram Shah then left for Ghazna to fight the Ghurids. R. B. Singh speculates that after revolting against Bahram Shah, Bahalim sought asylum with the Chahamanas. Arnoraja granted him the fief of Nagaur. After defeating Bahalim, Bahram Shah may have attempted to subdue Arnoraja, but was defeated. The Muslim chronicles probably omitted this event to avoid recording Bahram Shah's defeat.

=== Chaulukyas of Gujarat ===
==== Jayasimha Siddharaja ====
Arnoraja's reign saw a revival of the Chahamana-Chaulukya conflict, probably as a result of their attempts to control the weakening Paramara kingdom of Malwa. This conflict appears to have ended with an advantage to the Gujarat Chaulukya king Jayasimha Siddharaja. According to the Gujarat scholar Hemachandra's Dvyashraya, Ānā of Sapadalaksha (that is, Arnoraja), bent his head before Jayasimha. A Sambhar (Shakambhari) inscription provides a genealogy of the Chaulukya kings, from Mularaja to Jayasimha. It mentions Sambhar, which indicates that Jayasimha may have even occupied the Chahamana capital for a brief period.

Kirti Kaumidi also states that Jayasimha defeated Arnoraja, but adds that Jayasimha gave his daughter Kanchana in marriage to Arnoraja. Someshvara, the son of Arnoraja and Kanchana, was brought up at the Chaulukya court in Gujarat. The matrimonial alliance probably ended the conflict for a short period, but the Chaulukya-Chahamana conflict resumed after Jayasimha's death.

==== Kumarapala ====
After Jayasimha's death, a war of succession took place between his nominee and adopted son Chahada (also Bahada or Charudatta), and his relative Kumarapala. Chahada formed an alliance with Arnoraja and other princes, and instigated them to fight Kumarapala, as attested by several sources, including Dvyashraya, Kumarapala Charita, and Prabandha-Chintamani. According to Merutunga, the author of Prabandha Chintamani, Arnoraja attacked Gujarat because he thought of Kumarapala as a weaker ruler than Jayasimha. Historian A. K. Majumdar speculates that Arnoraja may have planned to replace Kumarapala with his son Someshvara.

According to the Kumarapala Charita, Arnoraja was defeated in this war, having suffered from an arrow shot in his face. The war appears to have ended with a matrimonial alliance: Arnoraja's daughter Jahlana married Kumarapala. According to later Jain legends, Kumarapala's sister Devalladevi also married Arnoraja. However, the existence of Devalladevi is doubtful. Despite the conflict, Kumarapala treated Arnoraja's son Someshvara (who lived with the Chaulukyas) well.

Sometime around 1150 CE, there appears to have been a second war between Arnoraja and Kumarapala. According to the Jain chroniclers of Gujarat, such as Jayasimha Suri, Rajashekhara and Jina-Mandana, Arnoraja once insulted Jains while playing chess with his wife Devalladevi. Rajashekhara's Prabandha Kosha states that while taking away a pawn of his wife, Arnoraja remarked "Kill these Mundikas" in jest. This offended her, because Mundika (literally "bald") could refer to the tonsured Śvetāmbara Jain gurus. Devalladevi, a devout Jain and a sister of Kumarapala, asked her brother to avenge this insult.

A. K. Majumdar pointed out that Kumarapala converted to Jainism at a later date, so the legend about his sister getting offended by Arnoraja appears to be historically inaccurate. According to Dasharatha Sharma, Devalladevi is a fictional character created by either Rajashekhara or another Jain writer, as none of the chronicles written before 14th century mention her. According to Majumdar, Arnoraja probably invaded the Chaulukya kingdom taking advantage of Kumarapala's involvement in other conflicts. This second war also ended with Arnoraja's defeat. Kumarapala's victory over Arnoraja is corroborated by multiple Chaulukya inscriptions.

=== Other campaigns ===
The Bijolia rock inscription states that Arnoraja retaliated against the Kusha-Varana (Kuśa-Varaṇa) kingdom. The identity of this kingdom is not certain. Historian A. K. Vyas theorized that Kusha and Varana were two separate kingdoms. He identified Kusha with Kannauj, and Varana with Bulandshahr. Historian R. B. Singh points out that Kannauj was ruled by the Gahadavala king Govindachandra, and it would not have been an easy task for Arnoraja to attack such a powerful kingdom. According to Dasharatha Sharma, in proper context, the term "kusha" means "sinful"; the inscription characterizes the Varanaa kingdom as a sinful one. Sharma theorizes that the Varana kingdom was ruled by Dod Rajputs, whose king was either Sahajaditya or Bhojadeva.

The Ajmer prashasti inscription states that Arnoraja reached the Sindhu and the Sarasvati rivers. In absence of other information, the details of this expedition are not clear.

== Death ==
Arnoraja had at least four sons. Of these, Someshvara was born of Kanchana, the Chaulukya princess of Gujarat. The other three were born of Sudhava, the princess of Marwar: Jagaddeva, Vigraharaja IV and Devadatta. Jagaddeva killed Arnoraja and occupied the Chahamana throne for a brief period, before Vigraharaja became the next king.
