= Ladol, Gujarat =

Lādol
- village
- Location in Gujarat, India Lādol (India)
- Coordinates: 23°37′0″N 72°44′0″E
- Country: India
- State: Gujarat
- District: Mehsana

Population (2011)
  - Total: 12,106

Languages
  - Official: Gujarati, Hindi
- Time zone: UTC+5:30 (IST)
- PIN: 382840
- Telephone code: 2763
- Vehicle registration: GJ2
- Nearest city: Vijapur
- Website: gujaratindia.com

Lādol or Ladol is a village of the Mehsana district in Gujarat, India. Ladol has a population of more than 14000. There is a temple of harsiddhmataji. It is 7 km away from Vijapur. Archaeologically Ladol has many things to search. Archaeologically Ladol is very old village. Previously it was known as "Latpalli". There is a Harsiddh Mataji temple in Ladol, which is built by Sidharaj Jaysinh., in Ladol also two more temple Shri Ranchodray (Krishna) & Gayatrimataji temple. Ladol village is popular farm for Potato.

== Sculptures ==
The Museum has a number of marble sculptures and other fragments from the site of Ladol, a village near Vijapur, Mehsana district, North Gujarat. At least about 9 pithas, the base of Tirthankara images, have inscriptions between the dates V.S.1313-1337 = 1256-1280 A.D. These are presumably the dates of installation of seated Tirthankara images. As many as 5 standing Tirthankara images in Kāyotasarga posture also belong to this site. One of the inscriptions mentions the name of the temple Kanhuvasahika and the name of donor 'Shreshthi Kanhu'. One of standing Tirthankara images, Śāntināth, is intact, along with its inscription, which was installed in V.S.1326 = 1269 A.D. The name of the village in the inscriptions is mentioned as Lātāpalli. However, no ruined medieval period temple is recorded from Ladol village in recent surveys. From the inscriptions it is clear that the temple was dedicated by Shresthi Kanhu, and therefore given the nomenclature of Kanhuvasahika. His sons and grandsons continued to donate further icons namely Jasahad and Punamāl. They belonged to Ukesaval caste, and their religious preceptor (guru) was Dharmachandrasuri of Shri Chaitragaccha.

The large number of sculptures collected from this site confirms that a temple was erected during the 11th century, when the Solanki King Kumarpala was the ruler. A set of four finished but unpolished standing Tirthankaras are datable to this period. Rest of the sculptures belong to the 13th century. The seated Tirthankaras were installed in niches called khattaka, along with phamsana (above) and pitha below (M.A. Dhaky). It has been suggested that the temple might have been renovated during this period at the same time when major renovations were being carried out at Girnar and at Dilwara temples in Mount Abu, sponsored by the Minister Vastupala. Because of the stylistic similarity with the Mount Abu sculptures, we think that Ladol temple sculptures represent Mount Abu school in the Gujarat region, along with the set of 9 portrait statues from the site of Harij (in the vicinity of Patan) dated V.S.1285 = 1228 A.D. Another group of sculptures from Ladol is housed in Prince of Wales Museum, Mumbai. They contain three inscriptions, two of which are dated in the year V.S.1356 (1299 A.D.) mentioning repairs carried out to the image of Tirthankara Ādināth, by the son and wife of Ratna. This name is already recorded in the inscriptions mentioned earlier from the L.D. Museum pithas. In the Madhuri Desai Gallery, we have placed four of the standing Tirthankaras in Sarvatobhadra or Chaumukha arrangement to give the ambiance of the Jaina shrine as well as to impart them the significance they deserve. The polished Śāntināth icon dated 1269 A.D. is facing the west side. Three other unpolished Tirthankaras are placed on the rest of the three cardinal directions. The unpolished image of standing Pārśvanāth is displayed independently in order to focus on the majestic Tirthankara in Kāyotsarga posture.
