= Sewari =

Sewadi
- rural
- Location in Rajasthan, India Sewadi (India)
- Coordinates: 25.10°N 73.283°E
- Country: India
- State: Rajasthan
- District: Pali

Population (2001)
  - Total: 8,844

Languages
  - Official: Hindi
- Time zone: UTC+5:30 (IST)
- PIN: 306707
- Telephone code: 02938
- ISO 3166 code: RJ-IN
- Vehicle registration: RJ-22
- Sex ratio: 0.971 ♂/♀

Sewari or Sewadi is a village located in the Bali Tehsil of Pali district of Rajasthan state, India, amidst the Aravalli Range. There is also a dam nearby with the same name. It covers an area of 3,789 hectares and has a population of 9,415 as per the 2011 Census. The village's pin code is 306707, and it is approximately 88 kilometers from the district headquarters in Pali and 378 kilometers from Rajasthan's state capital, Jaipur

== Demographics ==
The population of Sewari is 8,844 according to the 2001 census. Male population is 4,356 and female population is 4,488.
