= Western Chalukya literature in Kannada =

Historic Kannada literature from South India

Territory of the Western Chalukyas (c. 1100 CE) in India (modern boundaries shown) and the empire's capital, Kalyani, in the modern Bidar district, Karnataka state, India

A large body of Western Chalukya literature in the Kannada language was produced during the reign of the Western Chalukya Empire (973–1200 CE) in what is now southern India. This dynasty, which ruled most of the western Deccan in South India, is sometimes called the Kalyani Chalukya dynasty after its royal capital at Kalyani (now Basavakalyan), and sometimes called the Later Chalukya dynasty for its theoretical relationship to the 6th-century Chalukya dynasty of Badami. For a brief period (1162–1183), the Kalachuris of Kalyani, a dynasty of kings who had earlier migrated to the Karnataka region from central India and served as vassals for several generations, exploited the growing weakness of their overlords and annexed the Kalyani. Around 1183, the last Chalukya scion, Someshvara IV, overthrew the Kalachuris to regain control of the royal city. But his efforts were in vain, as other prominent Chalukya vassals in the Deccan, the Hoysalas, the Kakatiyas and the Seunas destroyed the remnants of the Chalukya power.

Kannada literature from this period is usually categorised into the linguistic phase called Old-Kannada. It constituted the bulk of the Chalukya court's textual production and pertained mostly to writings relating to the socio-religious development of the Jain faith. The earliest well-known writers belonging to the Shaiva faith are also from this period. Under the patronage of Kalachuri King Bijjala II, whose prime minister was the well-known Kannada poet and social reformer Basavanna, a native form of poetic literature called Vachana literature (lit "utterance", "saying" or "sentence") proliferated. The beginnings of the Vachana poetic tradition in the Kannada-speaking region trace back to the early 11th century. Kannada literature written in the champu metre, composed of prose and verse, was popularised by the Chalukyan court poets. However, with the advent of the Veerashaiva (lit, "brave devotees of the god Shiva") religious movement in the mid-12th century, poets favoured the native tripadi (three-line verse composed of eleven ganas or prosodic units), hadugabba (song-poem) and free verse metres for their poems.

Important literary contributions in Kannada were made not only by court poets, noblemen, royalty, ascetics and saints who wrote in the marga (mainstream) style, but also by commoners and artisans, including cobblers, weavers, cowherds and shepherds who wrote in the desi (folk) style. These Vachana poets (called Vachanakaras) revolutionised Kannada literature, rejecting traditional themes that eulogised kings and noblemen, and writing didactic poems that were closer to the spoken and sung form of the language. In addition to hundreds of male poets, over thirty female poets have been recorded, some of whom wrote along with their husbands.

== Background ==
=== Political developments ===
Literary developments in Kannada (10th–12th centuries CE)
| Developments | Date |
|---|---|
| Dominance of Jain devotional writings, in champu metre | 973–1150 |
| Early Secular writings by Jain authors | 1000–1100 |
| Early Vachana poems by Veerashaivas, in native metres | 1040–1120 |
| Consolidation of Kannada grammar | 1042 or 1145 |
| Veerashaiva movement and the proliferation of Vachana literature | 1150–1183 |
| Jain–Veerashaiva literary competition | 1150–1200 |

Towards the end of the 10th century, a new Karnataka dynasty, called the Western Chalukyas, had come to power by overthrowing the Rashtrakuta Empire of Manyakheta (modern Malkhed in the Kalaburagi district, Karnataka). Their earliest inscription is dated to c. 957 and is ascribed to a subordinate ruler, Tailapa II of Tardavadi, later to become the founding king of the empire, in the Bijapur district, Karnataka. An inscription from c. 967 suggests that an unsuccessful rebellion was staged by Chattideva, a local king belonging to the Chalukya family, with the help of the Kadamba chief from the temple town Banavasi. These events, however, paved the way for Tailapa II to launch a successful rebellion against the Rashtrakuta King Karka II with the help of the Kadamba chief of Hangal.

A century before these political developments, the age of great Sanskrit and Prakrit epics and classics had come to an end. This productive period had made available a vast corpus of literature that could be expressed in the local language of Kannada. Kannada, which had flourished both as a language of political discourse and literature in the Rashtrakuta court, found enthusiastic support from the Chalukya kings. The influential Jains, who according to historian A.S. Altekar may have comprised 30 percent of the population, not only dominated the cultural landscape of 9th and 10th century Karnataka, but were also eager to encourage literature in the local language. According to Professor S.N. Sen, a research fellow at the Indian council of historical research, Kannada literature under the Chalukyas reached a "perfection of form". Scholars Sheldon Pollock and Jan Houben have claimed that 90 percent of the Chalukyan royal inscriptions are in Kannada, a virtual displacement of Sanskrit as the language of courtly discourse.

=== Mainstream literature ===
For a few centuries after Kavirajamarga ("Royal path for poets", c. 850), the earliest available Kannada literary work, Jain writings had adhered to Sanskritic models that had been recognised by the state as the path for future Kannada writers, while relegating native poetic forms (compositions such as Chattana and Bedande) to subordinate status. The stranglehold that the Sanskritic models had over Kannada literature is best exemplified by Ranna's lexicon Rannakanda (990), where native day-to-day Kannada words had been translated into Sanskrit. This implied that the pure form of the local language was not viewed as equal to Sanskrit, from the cosmopolitan viewpoint. Kannada writings by Jain authors thus used impressive Sanskrit-derived verses interspersed with prose to extol the virtues of their patron kings, who were often compared to heroes from the Hindu epics. While Adikavi Pampa (Pampa Bharata, 941) compared his patron, the feudatory Chalukya King Arikesari, to Pandava prince Arjuna, in Vikramarjuna Vijaya, his version of the Hindu epic Mahabharata, Ranna (983) found it suitable to compare his patron, King Satyashraya, to Pandava prince Bhima.

=== Folk literature ===
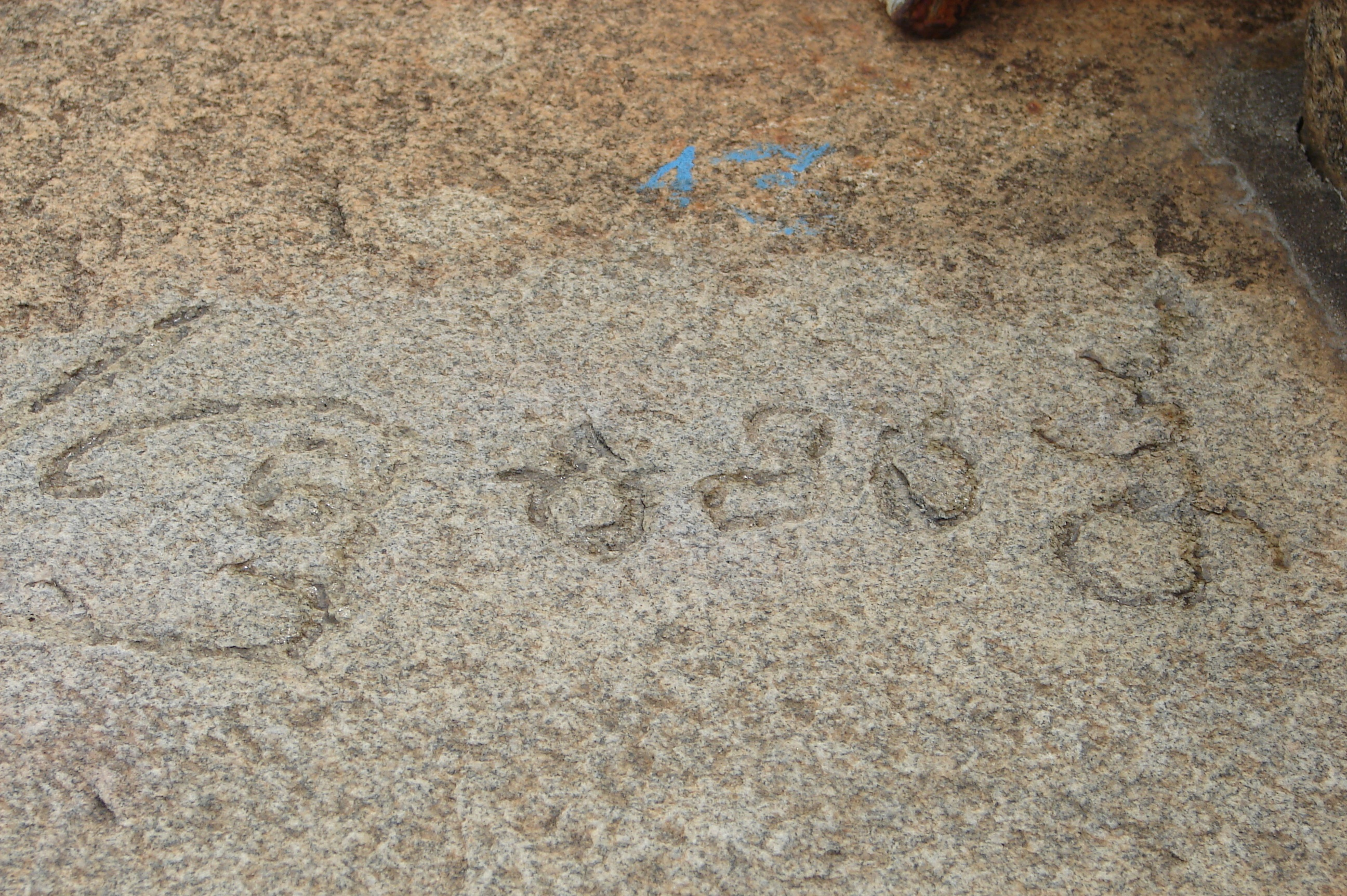
Inscribed handwriting of poet Ranna (c. 982) reads Kavi Ratna (gem among poets) in Shravanabelagola

The mainstream literary style was to lose popularity during the mid-12th century Kalachuri rule, due to the rise of revolutionary notions about the social and cultural order. The Veerashaivas, acting in protest, used the pure form of Kannada language in their poems; moreover, they encouraged writers from lower castes to participate and eliminated themes that had been considered formal by the king and the monastery. Thus, written in native metres, in a language close to the spoken form of Kannada, the Vachana poems gained mass appeal. A new religious faith was thereby propagated by the Veerashaivas whose ascendancy is called the "Veerashaiva movement" and their communicative genre, the Vachana. While the Vachana poetry is generally categorised as a part of the pan-Indian Bhakti (devotional) literature, such generalisations tend to disguise the very esoteric and anti-bhakti positions taken by many Vachanakaras. The origin of the Veerashaiva ideology and the beginnings of their poetry is unclear. According to D.R. Nagaraj, a scholar on literary cultures in history, modern scholars tend to favour two broad views: integrationist and indigenist. The integrationists, such as L. Basavaraju, trace the source of Vachana poetic tradition to the Sanskrit Upanishad scriptures and the Agama doctrine, though this does not explain why the movement did not blossom earlier or in the neighbouring Telugu-speaking region where radical Shaiva sects were known to be active. The indigenists, such as Chidananda Murthy, M.M. Kalaburgi and G.S. Shivarudrappa, propose a native Karnataka origin of the poetry, though they are yet to fully explain its unique nature.

=== Other developments ===
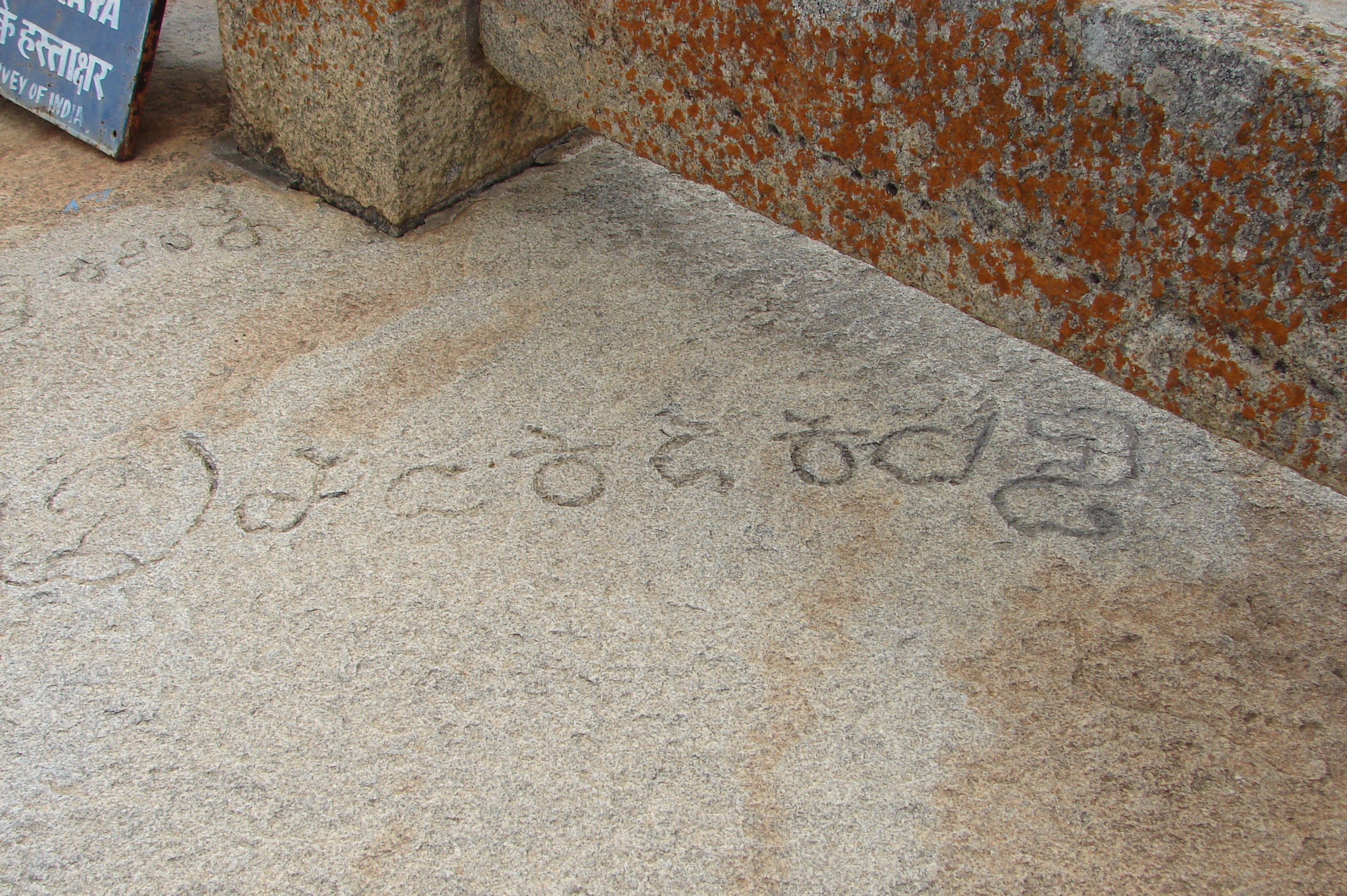
Inscribed handwriting of Chavundaraya (c. 978), Western Ganga minister and Kannada prose writer, on Chandragiri hill in Shravanabelagola

At about this time, adding to pressure from the popularity of the Vachana canon in the northern Kannada-speaking region, the noted Hoysala king Vishnuvardhana (1108–1152) of the southern Kannada-speaking region converted from Jainism to the Hindu sect of Vaishnavism. The popularity of Ramanujacharya's philosophy had spread in the Hoysala lands and Srivaishnavism, a sub-sect of Vaishnavism, was in the ascendant. By the late 13th century, the Veerashaiva writers, who were by now writing allegorical inscriptions and biographies of famous Vachanakaras of the 12th century, were in stiff competition with the Jains. The earliest attempts by the Jains to veer away from traditional puranic (philosophical) themes of renunciation are seen in the writings of Hoysala writers Nemichandra and Andayya. Lilavati Prabhandam, a novel written by Nemichandra (1170) on the topic of love, erotica, and of the victory of Kamadeva (god of love) over his arch-rival Shiva, is the first among such writings. It was followed by Kabbigara Kava ("Poets defender", 1215–1237) by Andayya, also a work depicting a war between Kamadeva and the god Shiva. Despite these efforts, the Jain literary influence was to recede in the coming decades and centuries, being relegated mostly to the coastal Kannada-speaking region. Works of enduring quality were still produced by maverick authors such as Ratnakaravarni (1557), though their numbers were fewer.

Contemporaneous to these developments, Nagavarma II wrote his Kannada grammar Karnataka bhashabhushana ("Ornament of Karnataka language", 1042 or 1145). A milestone in the history of Kannada literature, it helped consolidate the language as competitor to established languages such as Sanskrit and Prakrit, bringing the local language within the realm of literary cosmopolitanism. Writing a Kannada grammar in Sanskrit language was essential to Nagavarma II, a subtle rebuttal to Sanskritic scholars of the day who may have considered Kannada a language of the common man and its grammar as underdeveloped. In addition to the Chalukya patronage, Kannada poets and writers of this period were popular in the courts of neighbouring kingdoms of the western Deccan. The Hoysalas, the southern Kalachuris, the Seunas, the Gangas and the Silharas are some of the ruling families who enthusiastically used Kannada in inscriptions and promoted its literature.

== Kannada writings ==
=== Jain Court literature ===
==== Age of Ranna ====
Noted Kannada poets and writers in Western Chalukya Empire (973-1200 CE)
| Ranna | 982 |
| Nemichandra | 990 |
| Manasija | 10th c. |
| Chandrabhatta | 10th c. |
| Madiraja | 10th c. |
| Kavitavilasa | 10th c. |
| Kannamayya | 10th c. |
| Jayakirti | 1000 |
| Chandraraja | 1025 |
| Durgasimha | 1031 |
| Chavundaraya II | 1025 |
| Shridharacharya | 1049 |
| Nagavarma II | 1042 |
| Santinatha | 1068 |
| Gunachandra | 1070 |
| Nagavarmacharya | 1070 |
| Harivarma | 1070 |
| Narayana Deva | 11th c. |
| Gunavarma | 1070-1100 |
| Nayasena | 1112 |
| Kondugoli Keshiraja | 1120 |
| Prince Kirtivarma | 1125 |
| Brahmashiva | 1125 |
| Karnaparya | 1145 |
| Jagaddala Somanatha | 1150 |
Some noted Kannada Vachana poets (from more than 300) (11th-12th c. CE)
| Madara Chennaiah | 11th c. |
| Dohara Kakkaiah | 11th c. |
| Devara Dasimaiah | 1040 |
| Duggale | 1040 |
| Allama Prabhu | 1160 |
| Basavanna | 1160 |
| Akka Mahadevi | 1160 |
| Gangambike | 1160 |
| Neelambike | 1160 |
| Nagalambike | 1160 |
| Chennabasava | 1160 |
| Siddharama | 1160 |
| Madivala Machayya | 1160 |
| Ambigere Chowdiah | 1160 |
| Madara Dhooliah | 1160 |
| Hendada Mariah | 1160 |
| Turugahi Ramanna | 1160 |
| Kannadi Remmitande | 1160 |
| Revanna Siddha | 1160 |
| Urilinga Peddi | 1180 |
| Bahuroopi Chowdaiah | 11-12th c. |
| Satyakka | 1160 |
| Amuge Rayamma | 1160 |
| Kadive Remavva | 1160 |
| Mukthayakka | 1160 |
| Princess Bonta Devi | 1160 |

The late 10th century was a period of consolidation for the fledgling empire. Founding King Tailapa II and his successor, King Satyashraya, warred against their neighbours: the Shilharas of south Konkan, the Chaulukyas of Gujarat, the Paramara of central India and the Chola dynasty of Tanjore. Unaffected by these political developments, Kannada literature continued to flourish in the royal court. The foremost writer of this period was Ranna, who was born to a family of bangle sellers in the town of Mudhol. Ranna is considered by historians K.A. Nilakanta Sastri and Sailendra Nath Sen as one of the "three gems of Kannada literature" along with his seniors, Adikavi Pampa and Sri Ponna. Ranna became the court poet of King Tailapa II and King Satyashraya. In his early days, he was also patronised by the well-known Ganga minister Chavundaraya. Ranna is famous for writing Ajitha purana (993), which recounts the life of the second Jain tirthankar Ajitanatha. However, it is in his magnum opus, the work Sahasa Bhima Vijaya ("Victory of bold Bhima", also called Gada Yudda or "Conflict of Clubs'", 982) that he reaches his zenith of poetic grace while describing the conflict between Pandava Bhima and Kaurava prince Duryodhana in his Jain version of the Hindu epic Mahabharata.

Unlike Pampa who glorifies Arjuna and Karna in his writing, Ranna eulogises his patron King Satyashraya and favourably compares him to Bhima, whom he crowns at the end of the Mahabharata war. He calls Bhima's adversary Duryodhana mahanubhava ("a great person"). The work contains some of the earliest examples of elegiac verses (called shoka gita or charama gita) in the Kannada language, noted among which is one piece that describes the heart-rending lamentation (called karuna rasa or "sentiment of pathos") of Duryodhana on seeing the slain bodies of his brother Duhshasana, his inseparable friend in joy and sorrow, Karna, and Arjuna's valorous son Abhimanyu. The effect given to the writing, the language, the diction and the style maintained throughout the narration has earned Ranna a place among the most notable authors of Kannada literature. Ascribed also to Ranna is the earliest available dictionary in Kannada language called the Rannakanda (990), of which only eleven verses still exist. His other notable writings were the Chakeresvaracharita and the Parashuramacharitha. According to historian Suryanath Kamath, the latter work, which is now lost, may have been a eulogy of Chavundaraya, whom the poet admired. For his literary contributions, the title Kavi Chakravathi ("Emperor among poets") was bestowed upon Ranna by his patron king.

Another notable writer from the close of the 10th century, Nemichandra, wrote the Kaviraja kunjara and Lilavati (c. 990) with Prince Kavdarpa Deva of Jayantipura (modern Banavasi, Karnataka) and Princess Lilavati as the protagonists of the latter poem. Other writers from the close of the 10th century whose works are now lost but have been praised by the Chalukya minister Durgasimha (1031) are Kavitavilasa (patronised by King Jayasimha II), Madiraja, Chadrabhatta, Kannamayya and Manasija. Inscriptions such as the Kuppatur and Haveri records eulogize popular writers such as Harivarma (1070) and Narayana Deva respectively.

==== Early secular writings ====
According to Kannada scholar R. Narasimhacharya, despite the production of some important secular writings, repeated Chola invasions into Kannada lands in the 11th century may have adversely affected literary production. This situation was brought about by intense competition between the Western Chalukyas and their arch-rivals, the Cholas of Tanjore. Among notable writings, Chandraraja's Madanatilaka ("Forehead ornament of passion", 1025), written in the champu metre, is the earliest available work on erotica in the Kannada language and an adaptation of the Sanskrit Kamasutra by Vatsyayana. The narration is a dialogue between the patron and his wife in posakannada, the most modern Kannada in usage at the time. He was under the patronage of Machiraja, feudatory of King Jayasimha II (also called Jagadekamalla I). Shridharacharya, a Jain Brahmin patronised by King Someshvara I (also called Ahvamalla or Trailokyamalla) showed his ability to write on scientific subjects in Jatakatilaka (1049), the earliest available writing on astrology in Kannada, citing the Sanskrit astronomer Aryabhata. His other work is the lost Chandraprabha Charite, on belles-lettres.

Chavundaraya II, a Shaiva Brahmin (Brahmin devotee of the god Shiva) by faith and a protege of King Jayasimha II, wrote Lokopakara (c. 1025) in the champu metre. It is the earliest available encyclopaedia in the Kannada language, written at times with a poetic touch. It comprises twelve chapters and has found popularity in later references as well. The work is on various topics such as daily life, astronomy, astrology and forecasting of events based on the Indian calendar (panchanga phala), sculpture, construction of buildings (vastu vichara) and reservoirs (udakargala), omens, divination of water, preparation of medicine from herbs and plants (vrikshayurveda), general medicine (vaidya), perfumery, cookery and toxicology (vishavaidya). Mentioned in this book is the popular South Indian dish Idli and its preparation by soaking Urad dal (black gram) in butter milk, grinding it to a fine paste, and mixing with spices and the clear water of curd.

Durgasimha, the Sandhi Vigrahi (minister of war and peace) of King Jayasimha II wrote the well-known Panchatantra ("The five stratagems", 1031) in champu style, basing it on Gunadhya's Paishachi language original Brihatkatha. This fable is the first adaptation of the original into a vernacular language of India. Containing sixty fables in all, thirteen of which are original, each is summarised by an ethical moral based on a Jain tenet. Durgasimha also authored the Karnataka Banachatantra, the earliest available commentary in the Kannada language, giving a brief commentary on all the Sanskrit verses he quoted in the Panchatantra. Around this time, Jayakirti (c. 1000–1050), a Kannada language theorist, who considered the rules of prosody to be the same for Sanskrit and Kannada, wrote the Chandonusasana

There were other notable writers from the latter part of the 11th century. Shantinatha, patronised by King Someshvara II, wrote the poem Sukumaracharita in c. 1068. Nagavarmacharya, a Brahmin Advaita saint of Balligavi, who was patronised by King Udayatidya, a vassal of Chalukya King Someshvara II, wrote Chandrachudamani sataka (c. 1070) in the sataka (hundred-line verse) metre. In this centum of verses, where each ends with the term "Chandrachudamani" as another name of the god Shiva, the author treats on viragya (ethics of renunciation). Other writers whose works are considered lost but have been referenced in contemporary writings are Gunachandra and Gunavarma. Gunachandra, who was admired by King Someshvara II (also called Bhuvanaika Malla), wrote Parsvabhyudaya and Maghanadisvara. Gunavarma, who earned the honorific Bhuvanaika Vira, a title befitting a warrior rather than a poet, is mentioned by grammarian Keshiraja (c. 1260) as the author of Harivamsa. His title identifies him with a Ganga prince called Udayaditya who was a minister and general under Chalukya King Someshvara II. Other writings ascribed to the author are Pushpadanta Purana and Devachandra Prabha Stotra.

==== Vikrama era ====
The 12th century heralded an age of peace and prosperity. Cultural and literary developments received impetus during the rule of King Vikramaditya VI, a patron of the fine arts. The king, who ascended the throne in 1076 and ruled for fifty years occupies a pride of place in the history of Karnataka. His reign marks the end of the use of Saka Varsha (Indian calendar, the "Saka era") in Chalukya inscriptions and the start of Vikrama Varsha ("Vikrama era"). His court was adorned with some of the most well-known writers of Kannada and Sanskrit literature. Nayasena, whose writings are dated by the scholars D.R. Nagaraj and Sheldon Pollock to the 10th century, and by E.P. Rice and R. Narasimhacharya to c. 1112, wrote the Dharmamritha, a book containing fifteen stories that belong to the genre of fable and parable. Well known among these stories teaching about Jain tenets are "Yajnadatta and the mongoose", "Kapalika and the young elephant" and "Serpent, tiger, monkey and the goldsmith who had fallen in the old well". The writing is one of intense self-interrogation where the author criticises the beliefs of all contemporaneous religions while decrying the contamination in the original Jain beliefs due to external cultural influences, such as the practice of violent and bloody rituals and the caste system.

Brahmashiva, the court poet of King Vikramaditya VI, earned the title Kavichakravarti ("Emperor among poets") from his patron for his writing Samayaparikshe ("Analysis of the doctrine", c. 1125). In this philosophical writing, containing touches of propagandist satire and humor, the author seeks to prove the virtues of Jainism superior to all other contemporary religions. Brahmashiva portrays contemporary life and beliefs of the people of the Kannada-speaking region. He criticises Hinduism and the conversion of a Jain temple originally dedicated to the Tirthankar Chandrapraba in Kholapur into a Hindu temple deifying the goddess Mahalakshmi. He expresses reservation regarding the existence of religious cosmopolitanism within a household where family members followed multiple faiths. The author is concerned about the eroding popularity of Jainism in southern India due to the rising popularity of the Veerashaiva movement. Prince Kirtivarma, a younger brother of King Vikramaditya VI, wrote Govaidya ("Cattle Medicine"), the earliest available writing in Kannada on veterinary science, which mixes medicine and magic.

After the death of Vikramaditya VI, his successors, Someshvara III and Jagadhekamalla II continued to support poets and writers. Karnaparya's account of the life of the 22nd tirthankar Neminatha, the Neminathapurana (c. 1145) in champu metre, includes details of the Hindu epic Mahabharata and of the god Krishna from a Jain outlook. Jagaddala Somanatha's Karnataka Kalyanakaraka (1150), a translation of the Sanskrit writing Kalyanakaraka by Pujyapada, is the earliest writing on medicine in Kannada. It prescribes an entirely vegetarian and non-alcoholic diet.

==== Consolidation of grammar ====
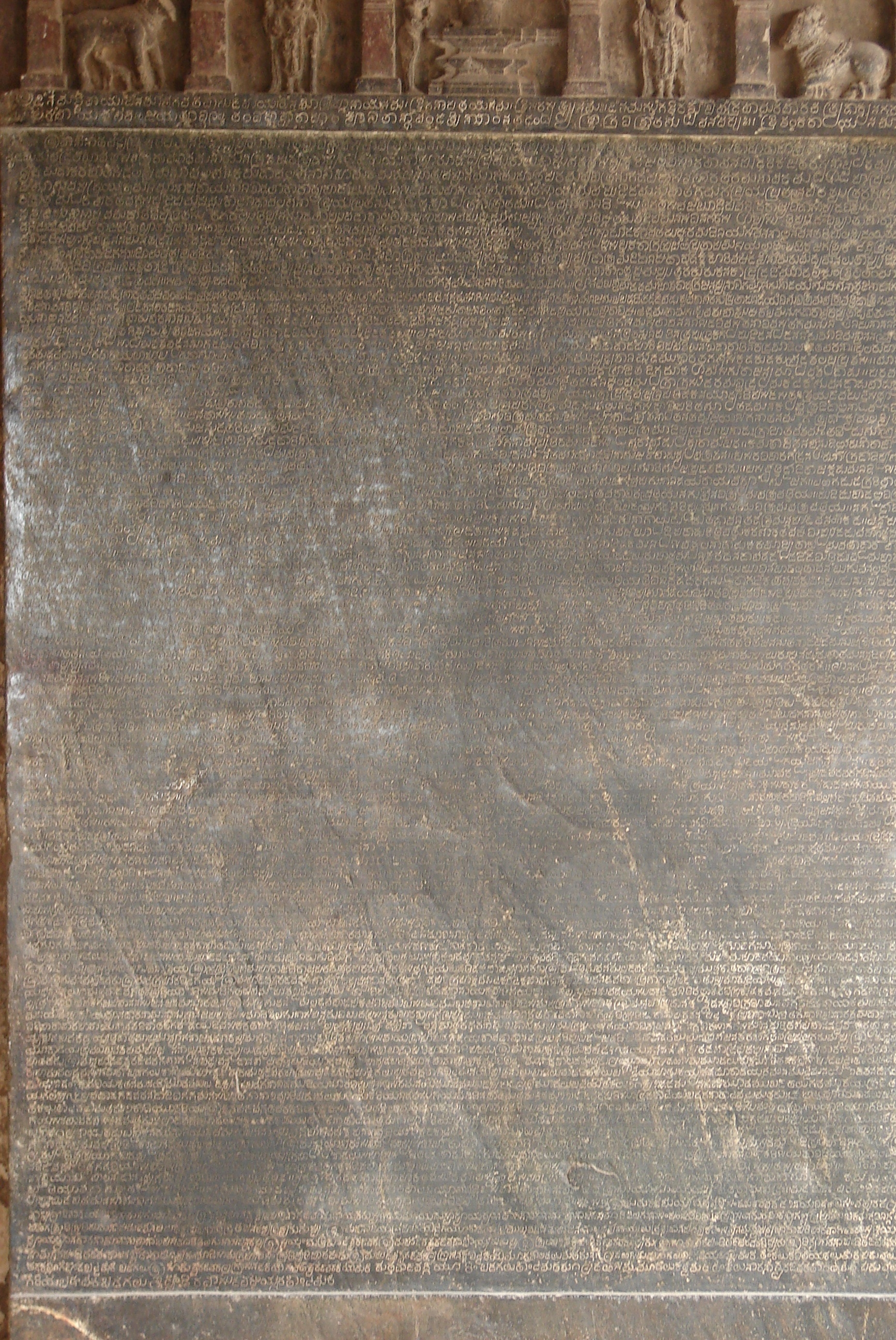
Old Kannada inscription of King Vikramaditya VI dated 1112 CE at Mahadeva Temple in Itagi, Karnataka

Among available works on Kannada grammar, a part of Kavirajamarga (850) forms the earliest framework. The occurrence of the term purvacharyar in some contexts of the writing may be a reference to previous grammarians or rhetoricians. Though Nagavarma II is credited to be the author of the earliest exhaustive Kannada grammar, the author mentions his predecessors, Sankavarma and Nagavarma-I (the extant Chhandombudhi, "Ocean of Prosody", c. 984) as path-makers of Kannada grammar. The exact time when grammarian Nagavarma-II lived is debated by historians. Until the discovery of Vardhamana Puranam ("Life of Varadhama", c. 1042) written in Kannada by an author who goes by the same name, it was broadly accepted by scholars including E.P. Rice, R. Narasimhacharya and K.A. Nilakanta Sastri that Nagavarma II lived in the mid-12th century (1145) and was also the Katakacharya ("poet laureate") of Chalukya King Jagadhekamalla II. However, of late, the Encyclopaedia of Indian literature, published by the Sahitya Akademi (1988), and scholars D.R. Nagaraj and Sheldon Pollock concur that Nagavarma II lived in the mid-11th century and was the poet laureate of Chalukya King Jayasimha II, who had the epithet Jagadekamalla ("Lord of the world").

Irrespective of when Nagavarma II lived, it is accepted that few scholars in the history of Kannada literature made important contributions in as many subjects as he did. His writings on grammar, poetry, prosody, and vocabulary are standard authorities and their importance to the study of the Kannada language is well-acknowledged. Among his available writings, the historically important Kavyavalokana ("Treatise on the art of poetry") on grammar, poetics and rhetoric is considered path-breaking and contains all the essentials of Kannada grammar. The first section of the book is called Sabdasmriti and contains five chapters dealing with euphonic combinations, nouns, compounds, nominal derivatives and verbs respectively. It is based on earlier works by the Sanskrit grammarians Dandin and Bhamaha. The Karnataka Bhashabhushana, a consolidated and exhaustive Kannada grammar written by Nagavarma II in the Sanskrit language, follows the fundamental framework of the Katantra school of Sanskrit grammar. For his contribution to Kannada grammar, Nagavarma II earned the honorific Sarvavarma – the name of the noted Sanskrit grammarian of the Satavahana era. His Abhidana Vastukosa ("Treasury of significations"), a lexicon, gives Kannada equivalents of nearly eight thousand Sanskrit words and is considered an achievement which gave Kannada language considerable footing in the world of Sanskrit literary dominance. Modern Kannada poet Govinda Pai proposed that the author of Karnataka Bhashabhushana was a different Nagavarma who belonged to the mid-12th century.

=== Bhakti literature ===
==== Early poets ====
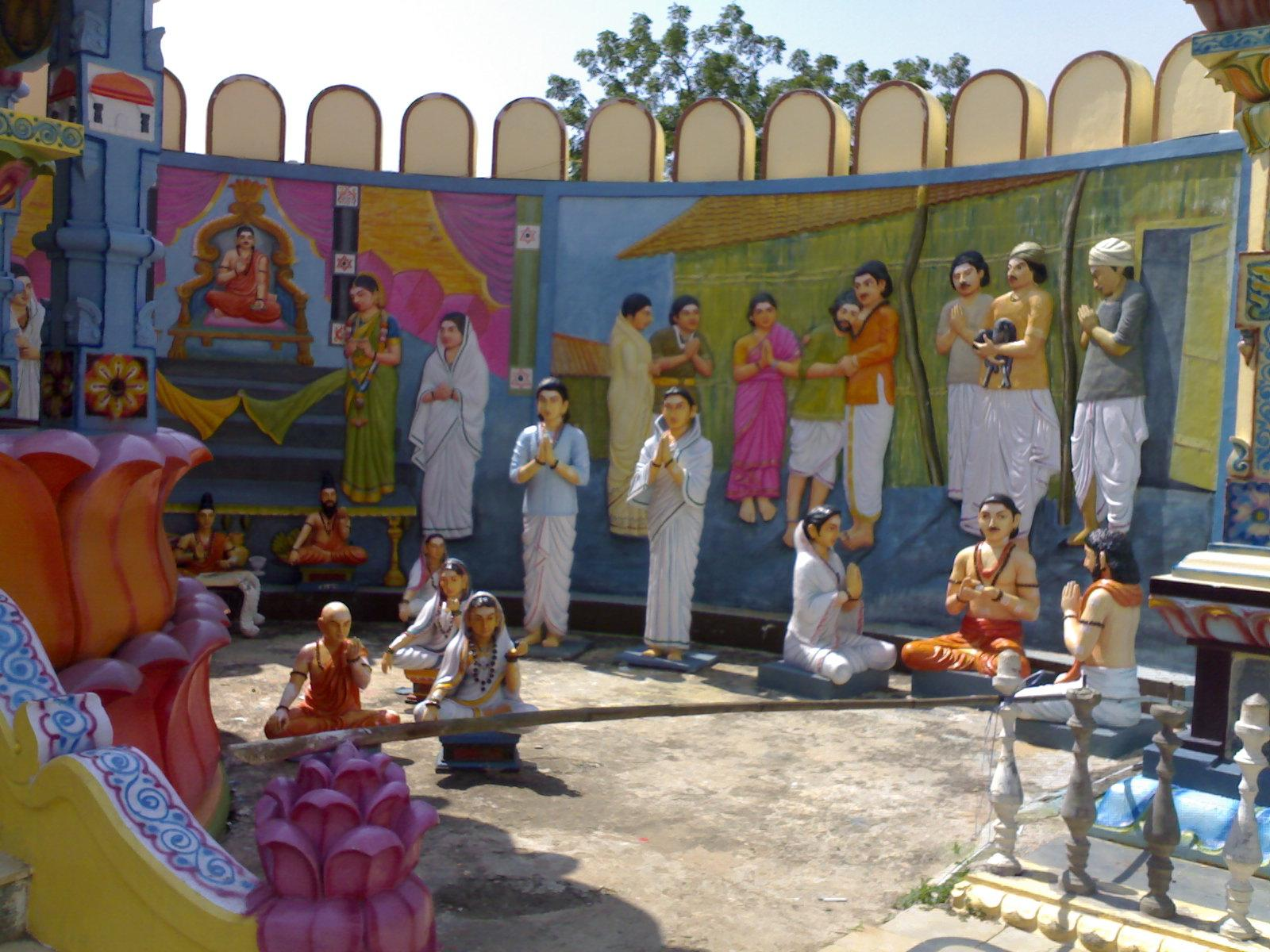
A sculptural depiction at Kudalasangama of the 12th-century Veerashaiva congregation

The meteoric rise of Veerashaivism (a religious sect which preaches devotion to the god Shiva, also called "Lingayatism") in caste-ridden 12th-century Karnataka has historic significance because it embraced commoners from the lower strata of society, people who had hitherto been denied access to even basic education. The essence of the movement, also seen in the resulting Vachana poems, was the rejection of temple-based ritual worship and the hegemony of mainstream Sanskritic texts and scriptures. The movement encouraged a monotheistic belief in the Hindu deity Shiva which, according to Kannada scholar H.S. Shiva Prakash, is a possible influence of the 63 Nayanmars (poets devoted to the god Shiva, 5th–10th century) of the Tamil-speaking region. The followers of the faith prayed not to a conventional image of a God but rather wore a linga (symbol of the god Shiva) on their body. The beginnings of the Vachana poetry (called Vachana Sahitya – "Vachana literature", or Anubhava Sahitya – "mystic literature" and sometimes Sharana Sahitya – "literature of the devotees"), a unique form of expression in the Kannada language, can however be traced back to the 11th century.

Names of three poets from the 11th century and some of their poems are available. Madara Chennaiah, a cobbler turned saint, is considered by H.S. Shiva Prakash as the first Vachana poet, and was held in high esteem by latter day poets of the 12th century, including Basavanna. Only ten of Chennaiah's poems, expressing his resentment of the caste system in metaphors taken from the cobblers' trade, are extant today. Dohara Kakkaiah is the second poet. A dalit by birth, his six available poems are confessional in nature, a theme seen in the later poems of Basavanna. Devara Dasimaiah (or Jedara Dasimaiah, 1040) is better known because a hundred and fifty of his poems are available. Written in a deft and concise language of proverbs and metaphors, his poems encourage monotheistic belief in the god Shiva. Dasimaiah's wife Duggale qualifies as Kannada's first women poet, though only a few of her poems are available.

==== Rebel literature ====
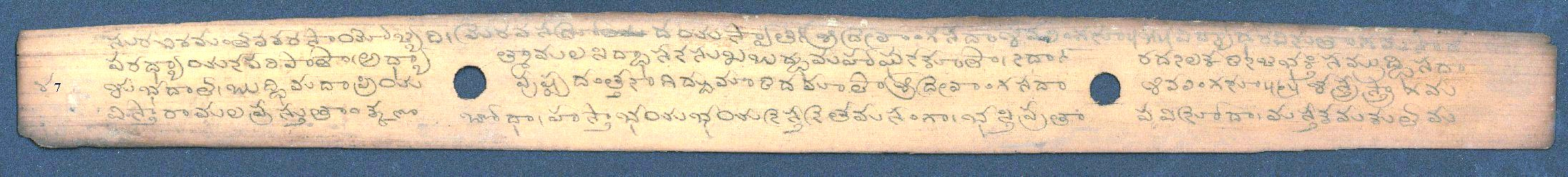
Palm leaf with 11th–12th century Vachana poems in old Kannada

In the mid-12th century, the Kalachuris successfully warred against their overlords, the Western Chalukyas, and annexed their capital Kalyani. During this turbulent period lasting three decades (1153–1183), Veerashaivism gained popularity. According to H.S. Shiva Prakash, the Kalachuri period is one of the high points of medieval Kannada literature. Basavanna (or Basava), a social reformer and the prime minister of Kalachuri King Bijjala II, is generally regarded as the inspiration behind this movement. Allama Prabhu, Chennabasava, Siddharama, Akka Mahadevi, and Kondugoli Keshiraja are other well-known poets among several hundred in this cadre.

A centre of religious discussions called Anubhava Mantapa ("Hall of experience") in Kalyani became the conclave where devotees gathered to discuss their mystic experiences. Here, they expressed their devotion to Shiva in simple poems called Vachanas. These were spontaneous utterances of rhythmic, epigrammatical and satirical prose emphasising the worthlessness of riches, rituals and book learning. Many of these poems are anonymous, but the authors are identifiable by the unique divine name of the god Shiva that is invoked in the poem.

Basavanna

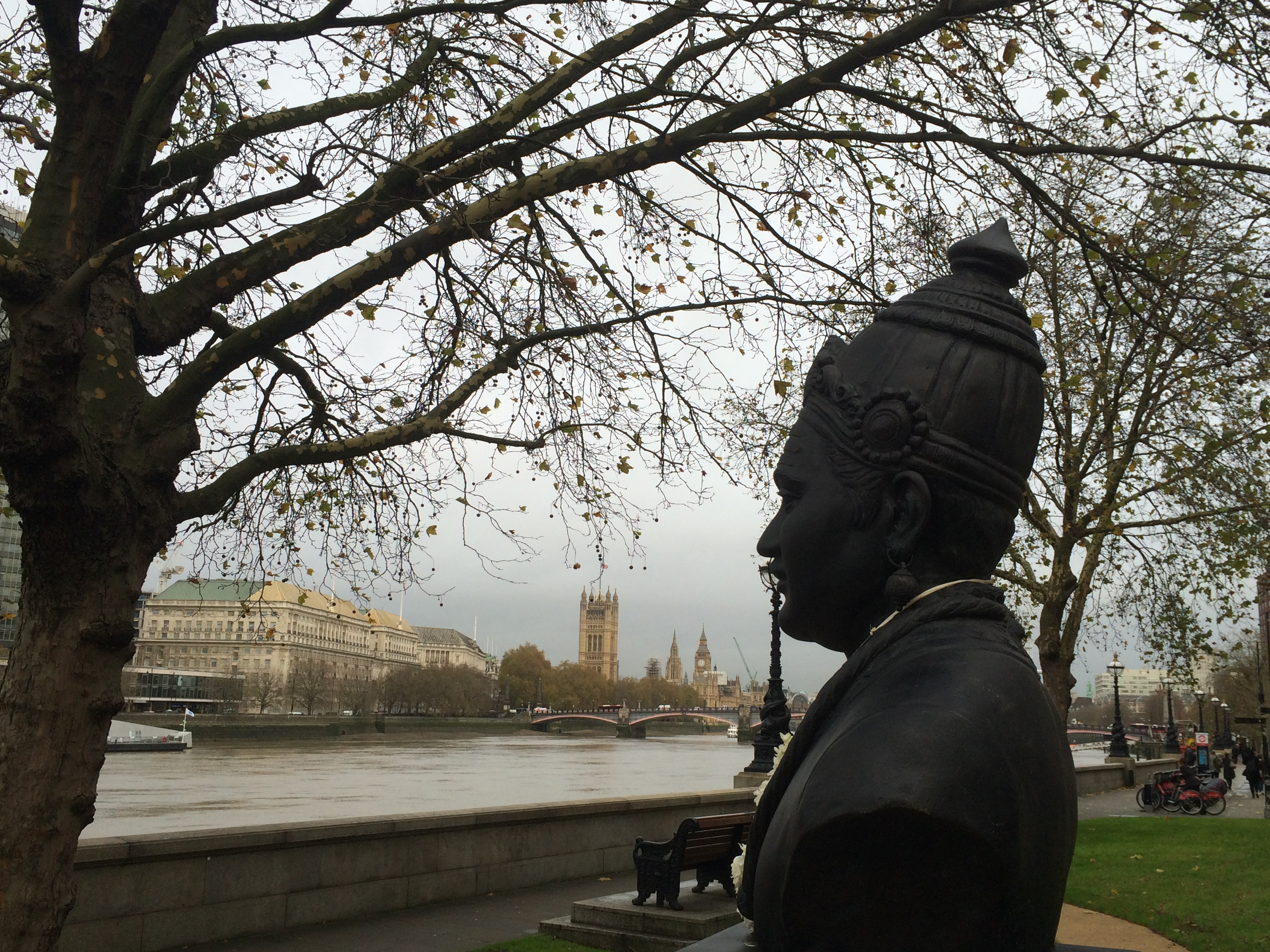
The bust of Basaveswara (or Basavanna), unveiled in London in 2015, facing the UK Parliament

Born to Brahmin parents in the town of Basavana Bagewadi, Basavanna (1106–1167) rejected the upanayanam ("ritual thread ceremony") and left home for Kudalasangama, a holy place at the confluence of the Krishna and Ghataprabha rivers in Bagalkot district, Karnataka. According to historian P.B. Desai, it was here, during his tutelage under the saint Ishanyaguru, that Basavanna had visions of his life's purpose. The life of Basavanna marks a milestone in the history of Karnataka state, India. A towering personality, his zeal and socio-cultural achievements in the realm of peace and equality of mankind have brought about enduring changes in society.

Information about his life and achievements come from the many Kannada writings, the earliest of which were written just after his death. Hoysala poet Harihara's Basavarajadevara ragale is the first known biography on Basavanna. Vijayanagara poet-writer Bhima Kavi's Basavapurana (1369), Singiraja's Amala Basavacharite (1500), Vijayanagara minister Lakkanna Dandesa's Shiva Tatwachintamani (1425–1450) are some of the important sources. The cornerstone of Basavanna's philosophy was "work-worship is heaven" or "kaayakave kailasa", the rejection of mere worship of God and the acceptance of one's own body as a temple of God. Basavanna strongly advocated a life of complete commitment to work. As a poet, he finds a place of pride in Kannada literature. His deftly written poems end with the word "Kudalasangama" which literally means "God of the confluence of two rivers", the poet's version of the god Shiva. About 1,300 such poems have survived, and have been described by H.S. Shiva Prakash as lyrical, satirical, deeply contemplative and self-critical.

In one satirical poem, Basavanna decries the hypocrisy of a snake charmer and his wife, who on their way to find a bride for their son cancel the journey when they come across a bad omen – another snake charmer and his wife. Though Basavanna himself was a minister under the patronage of the king, some of his poems betray his contempt towards kingship and deep devotion to the god Shiva. A poem by Basavanna:

I am one. Five are burning me.
Unbearable, the fire above
I cannot stand. When
A tiger is dragging a wild bull away
Can you not rescue, Kudalasangamadeva.

Allama Prabhu

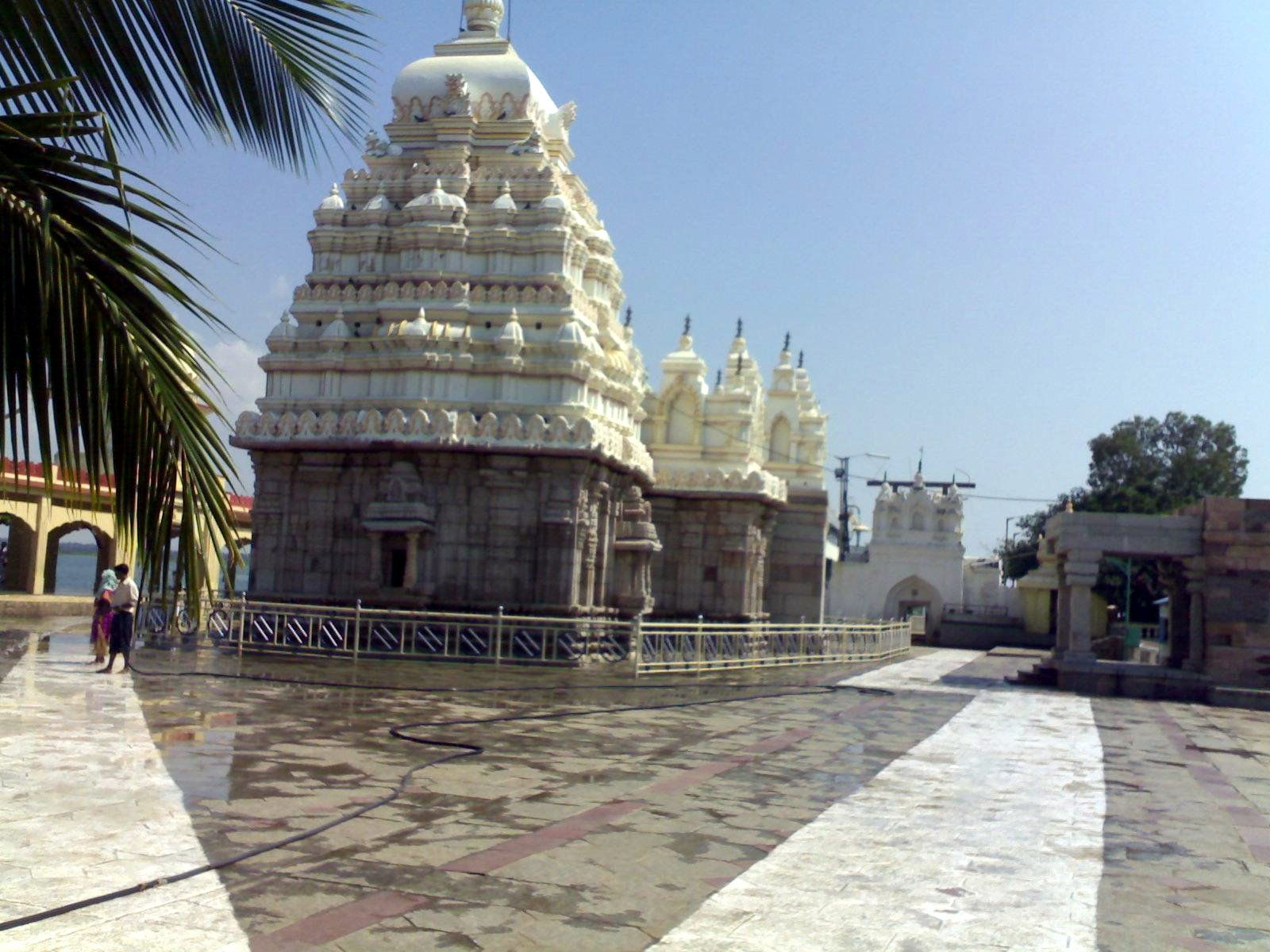
Sangamanatha temple at Kudalasangama, where Basavanna found his inspiration

Allama, also known as Allama Prabhu (lit, "Allama the master") was a mendicant saint-poet who took to the path of asceticism after the untimely death of his wife Kamalate. He was born into a family of hereditary temple performers and was himself an expert on the drum (called maddale) in Balligavi, a town of great antiquity in the Shivamogga district, Karnataka. Wandering around grief-stricken by his wife's death, he came across a saint called Animisayya who initiated him into asceticism.

Ascribed to Allama are 1,321 extant poems, each of which end with the word "Guhesvara" (lit, "Lord of the Cave", a form of the god Shiva), for it is said Allama found enlightenment in a cave. Allama's cryptic poems, though full of kindness, are known for their satire, mockery, invective and rejection of siddhis (occult powers). H.S. Shiva Prakash compares Allama's poems to the Koans in Japanese Zen poetry. According to D.R. Nagaraj, Allama's mystic poems are in a category all of their own and do not qualify as bhakti poems, which are typically characterised by transparent devotion.

While Basavanna's zeal and influence led to the formation and popularity of the Veerashaiva movement in Kalyani, it was Allama who was the undisputed spiritual authority presiding over the gatherings of the devotees. Chamarasa, a well-known 15th-century Kannada writer in the court of Vijayanagara King Deva Raya II wrote Prabhulinga Lile (1430), an account of the preachings and achievements of Allama; it was translated into the Telugu and Tamil languages at the behest of his patron king, and later into the Sanskrit and Marathi languages. In the story, Allama is considered an incarnation of the Hindu god Ganapathi while Ganapathi's mother, Parvati (Shiva's consort), takes the form of a princess of Banavasi. A notable anthology called the Sunyasampadane ("The achievement of nothingness", 1400) was compiled on the life of Allama and gives details about his interaction with contemporary saints. A poem by Allama Prabhu:

I saw
The fragrance fleeing
When the bee came,
What a wonder!
I saw
Intellect fleeing
When the heart came.
I saw
The temple fleeing
When God came.

Akka Mahadevi

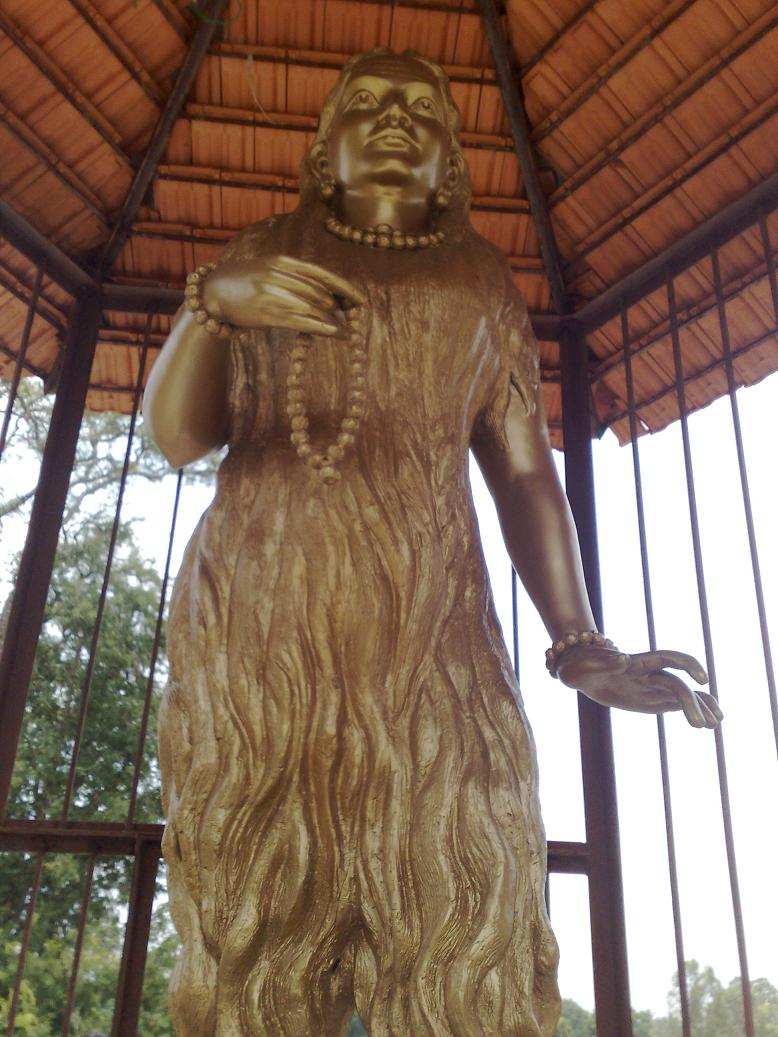
Akka Mahadevi, noted female Kannada poet, 12th century

Prominent among the more than thirty women poets was Akka Mahadevi. Born to a merchant family in the town Udatadi (or Udugani) in the Shivamogga district, and possibly married against her wishes to a feudal chief called Kausika, she renounced worldly pleasures, opting for a life of devotion and asceticism. She is often compared to other such notable female saint-poets of Hinduism as Andal, Lalleswari and Meera Bai, and is considered one of the prominent female poets of the Kannada language.

The 430 short poems written by her, in a language that depicts her love for her divine lover "Channa Mallikarjuna" (lit, "Beautiful Mallikarjuna", a name for the god Shiva), and the 15th-century anthology, the Sunyasampadane, are the main sources of information about her life. Her poetry is characterised by scorn for physical possessions and detachment from worldly affairs. A popular poem written by her describes the life of a silk worm which spins a cocoon, becomes entangled in the threads, and eventually dies because it cannot extricate itself – the silk worm is compared to a person and the silk threads, to worldly desires. In a poem of puns, the poet prays that her god, whom she describes as the "Lord of fragrant Jasmines", may cut through the cocoon of desires so she may become free like a butterfly.

In addition to poetry, she is credited with two short writings, Mantrogopya and Yogangatrividhi, the latter written in the native tripadi metre, describing the various stages of spiritual enlightenment. Tradition has it that Akka Mahadevi preferred to wear no clothes, a form of renunciation which in her own words was the "most exalted spiritual state". She died while still in her twenties in a plantain grove in the holy city of Srisailam. A poem by Akka Mahadevi:

You are the whole forest
And all the birds and beasts in the forest.
O Channamallikarjuna,
You inform all things
But why don't you show your face to me?

Other poets

Basavanna's nephew, Chennabasava, is more popular as a strategist and a theologian. Apart from authoring some notable and lengthy Vachana poems, he wrote on yogic experiences in a book called Mantragopya. He is known to have been the manager of the gatherings and the Mahamane ("great house") of Basavanna. Credited to Siddharama, another influential devotee and a native of Sonnalige (modern Sholapur, Maharashtra), are writings in tripadi metre and 1,379 extant poems (though he has claimed authorship of 68,000 poems). His poems were influenced by Basavanna's ideology and convey rejection of blind beliefs, the caste system, and sexual discrimination.

Artisan poets included Molige Maraiah, a wood cutter; Madivala Machayya, a washerman; Ambigere Chowdiah, a ferryman; Madara Dhooliah, a cobbler; Hendada Mariah, a toddy tapper; Turugahi Ramanna, a cowherd; Kannadi Remmitande, a mirror maker; and Revanna Siddha, a shepherd, as but a few in a long list of poets. Poets Dakkeya Bommaiah, Bahuroopi Chowdaiah, Kalaketaiah and Nageya Maritande were ritual street performers and their poems reflect images from their trade.

Several women poets made important contributions including: Basavanna's sister Nagalambike and his two wives, Gangambike and Neelambike, though Neelambike seems to have been the more prolific. Some female poets were wives of male poets in the Veerashaiva congregation. Notable among them are Satyakka, whose poems compare in quality to those of Akka Mahadevi, Kelavve (a dalit poet), whose poems scorn at the upper caste people, Mahadevi and Lingamma, who wrote poems in a mystic language, Amuge Rayamma and Akkamma, who penned poems on the hypocrisy of religious pretences, Kadire Remavva (a spinner), who employed a cryptic language called bedagu in her poems, and Muktayakka, who is known for her debates with the patron saint Allama himself. Other names worthy of mention are Lakkamma, Ketaladevi, Guddavve and a princess called Bontadevi.

==== Decline ====
Challenging the very core of the caste-based society, the Veerashaivas conducted a marriage between an upper caste Brahmin bride and a lower caste Shudra groom. The resulting confrontation between rebellious Veerashaivas and the conservative upper classes lead to the assassination of King Bijjala II and the eviction of most devotees, including Basavanna, from Kalyani. The successors of King Bijjala II were weak, prompting Chalukya Someshvara IV, ruling from Annigeri, to attempt rebuilding his empire by invading Kalyani in 1183. Though his invasion was successful, his overall efforts failed and the dynasty was ended by the Seuna rulers who drove Someshvara IV into exile in Banavasi in 1189. Though these turbulent events caused a setback to the Veerashaiva gatherings and creation of poems, the movement had set roots in the Kannada soil and regained popularity in the 15th century under the patronage of the rulers of the Vijayanagara Empire.

== Literature after the Chalukyas ==
The post-Chalukya period is characterised by the popularity of Shaiva and Vaishnava devotional writings, though secular and courtly topics written in native metres continued to flourish. Native metres in vogue were the shatpadi (six-line verse), the tripadi, the ragle (rhymed couplets) and the sangatya (compositions meant to be sung to the accompaniment a musical instrument). Overall, Kannada writings began to change from marga ("formal", due to Sanskritic influence) to desi ("vernacular") and become more accessible to the common man.

This change is apparent in the writings of the Hoysala court poets, some of whom are noted for pioneering works in native metres. The Veerashiava poet Harihara, one of the most prominent poets of the medieval era, established the ragale tradition with his biography of Basavanna (Basavaraja Devara ragale, 1160), the earliest available biography of the social reformer and of the Kannada language as well. His nephew Raghavanka established the shatpadi metre in his unique and original narration of the story of King Harishchandra called Harishchandra Kavya (1200). Sisumayana is credited with introducing a new composition called sangatya (1232) in his allegorical poems Tripuradahana ("Burning of the triple fortress") and Anjanacharita. Some Jain authors continued the champu tradition, such as Janna, immortalised by his writing Yashodhara Charite (1207), a unique set of stories in 310 verses dealing with sadomasochism and transmigration of the soul. The earliest well-known Brahmin writers also emerged during the late 12th century and wrote on themes ranging from Vaishnava faith (Rudrabhatta's Jagannatha Vijaya, 1185) to secular treatises on poetics (Kavi Kama's Sringara Ratnakara, on poetic sentiment and flavor).

After the fall of the Kalachuri empire, the Vachana poetic tradition halted temporarily. However, by the 14th century, the Veerashaivas who held influential positions in the Vijayanagara Empire were exerting their influence, especially during the reign of King Deva Raya II (or Prouda Deva Raya). Although this period is not as famous for the proliferation of the Vachana poems as the 12th century was, contemporary writers adopted the preachings of the saints and devotees of the bygone era and made them the protagonists of their writings. Having found a rallying point to spread their faith, they began an era of commentaries, anthologies and biographies. Famous among biographies were Bhimakavi's Basavapurana (1369), Singiraja's Mala-Basavapurana (or Singirajapurana, 1500) on the life of Basavanna, Chamarasa's Prabhulingalile (1425) on the life of Allama Prabhu and Virupaksha Pandita's Chenna Basavapurana (1584), an account of Chennabasava. Among a long list of anthologies, four versions of the Shunyasampadane are the most well-known. The first version, completed in 1400 by Shivaganaprasadi Mahadevaiah, was written in the form of a dialogue between the protagonist, saint Allama Prabhu, and other well-known Veerashaiva devotees. Later versions were compiled by Halage Arya (1500), Gummalapura Siddhalingayati (1560) and Gulur Siddhaveeranodaya (1570). Writing Vachana poems was popularised again from the mid-16th century, though Kannada language had to wait till the 17th century to discover its greatest modern poet in this genre. Sarvajna (lit. "The all knowing", 16th or 17th century), a mendicant poet-moralist and social reformer, left an indelible imprint on Kannada literature with his didactic poems, numbering about 2,100 in all. Written using the simple native tripadi metre to instruct the country folk, these poems cover a vast range of topics, from caste and religion to economics and administration, from arts and crafts to family life and health. Sarvajna's poems constitute some of Kannada's most popular works.

Four noted Brahmin writers of the Vijayanagara empire, Kumara Vyasa, Timmanna Kavi, Kumara Valmiki and Chatu Vitthalanata proliferated the shatpadi metre in their versions of the Hindu epics. Inspired by the Vachana writers who used the song-prose medium to write their poems, the Haridasa poets used genres such as the kirthane (musical compositions with two refrains – composition based on raga, or tune and tala, or rhythm), the Suladi (rhythm-based) and the Ugabhoga (melody-based) to convey their devotion to God. Their contributions to the south Indian classical music (Carnatic music) is well acclaimed, Purandaradasa and Kanakadasa being the most popular poets of this cadre. Purandaradasa was the most prolific Haridasa poet who wrote in the ragale metre and also earned the honorific Karnataka Sangeeta Pitamaha ("Father of Carnatic music"). Kanakadasa was versatile in many native metres. His Mohana tarangini is in the sangatya metre, Nalacharita and a book of morals for children called Haribhakti-sara are in the shatpadi metre.
