= Narasimha II of Vemulavada =

10th century monarch in Telangana, India

Narasimha II (IAST: Nara-siṃha, r. c. 915-930) was a ruler of the Vemulavada Chalukya dynasty of present-day Telangana, India. As a vassal of the Rashtrakuta king Indra III, he led an Rashtrakuta army against the Gurjara-Pratihara king Mahipala. According to his dynasty's records, he advanced as far as river Ganga (locally, the Godavari River is referred to as Ganga and Dakshna Ganga, and its tributaries around the locality are called Wainganga River and Painganga River), forcing Mahipala to flee.

== Early life ==
Narasimha II was a son of his predecessor Yuddhamalla III, and a grandson of Baddega. Like his predecessors, he was a Rashtrakuta feudatory. A verse in the Vikramarjuna Vijayam, composed by the Chalukya court poet Pampa, states that his son Arikesari II had Indra's shoulder as his cradle. According to one theory, this may mean that Narasimha's wife Jakavve and the mother of Arikesari II, was a daughter of the Rashtrakuta king Indra III. While this is plausible, no direct evidence supports this hypothesis.

== Campaign against the Gurjara-Pratiharas ==
The Vemulavada inscription of Arikesari II and the Vikramarjuna Vijayam credit him with several military successes. These records suggest that he achieved these victories on his own, but actually, he achieved these successes as a participant in a campaign of his Rashtrakuta overlord Indra III. The Khambhat (Cambay) inscription of Indra's son Govinda IV attributes these military victories to Indra, which suggests that Narasimha II assisted his overlord Indra in a Rashtrakuta campaign in central and northern India.

During the reign of Indra's predecessor Krishna II, the Gurjara-Pratihara king Mahipala had captured Malwa and other regions ruled by the Rashtrakuta feudatories. Therefore, Indra invaded the Gurjara-Pratihara kingdom to recover these territories. According to the Vemulavada inscription, Narasimha conquered the Latas, which suggests that the Rashtrakuta forces conquered the Lata region from the Gurjara-Pratiharas.

The Vemulavada inscription further suggests that Narasimha reduced the seven Malavas to ashes, and extracted tribute from their rulers. This suggests that the Rashtrakuta army conquered the Malwa region (which was probably divided into seven principalities at the time) and forced the local rulers to become Rashtrakuta tributaries.

According to the Vemulavada inscription, Narasimha defeated Mahipala, the king of the Gurjaras, forcing him to flee; and subjugated the Gurjara kingdom. He defeated the king of the Gurjaras on the banks of the Ganges river, and bathed his horses in the Ganges river. The Chalukya court poet Pampa describes Narasimha's achievements as follows:

Narasimha plucked from Gurjara king's arms the Goddess of victory, whom, though desirous of keeping, he had held too loosely. Mahipala fled as if struck by thunderbolt, staying neither to eat nor to rest, nor to pick himself up, while Narasimha pursuing bathed his horses at the junction of the Ganges and established his fame.

— Pampa

The Chalukya records also state that Mahipala installed his sword at a stone victory pillar at Kalapriya. Some earlier scholars have identified Kalapriya with the Mahakala temple at Ujjain, but there is no concrete evidence to support this identification. Kalapriya is probably modern Kalpi, where a temple dedicated to the deity Kalapriya is located on the banks of the Yamuna River. The Rashtrakuta forces besieged the Kalapriya shrine, demolished the walls of the prakara with their elephants, and tore off the flags in the courtyard.

This description suggests that the after capture Lata and Malwa, the Rashtrakuta army proceeded to the Yamuna River in the north, and defeated Mahipala's Gurjara-Pratihara forces. As a Rashtrakuta general, Narasimha advanced up to the Ganges river, where he bathed his horses, and then returned to Kalapriya, where he erected a victory pillar. The Rashtrakuta army did not annex the Ganga-Yamuna plains to their territory, and returned to their core territory in Deccan after the campaign.
