= Bommalagutta =

Jain temple in Telangana, India

- బొమ్మలమ్మ గుట్ట
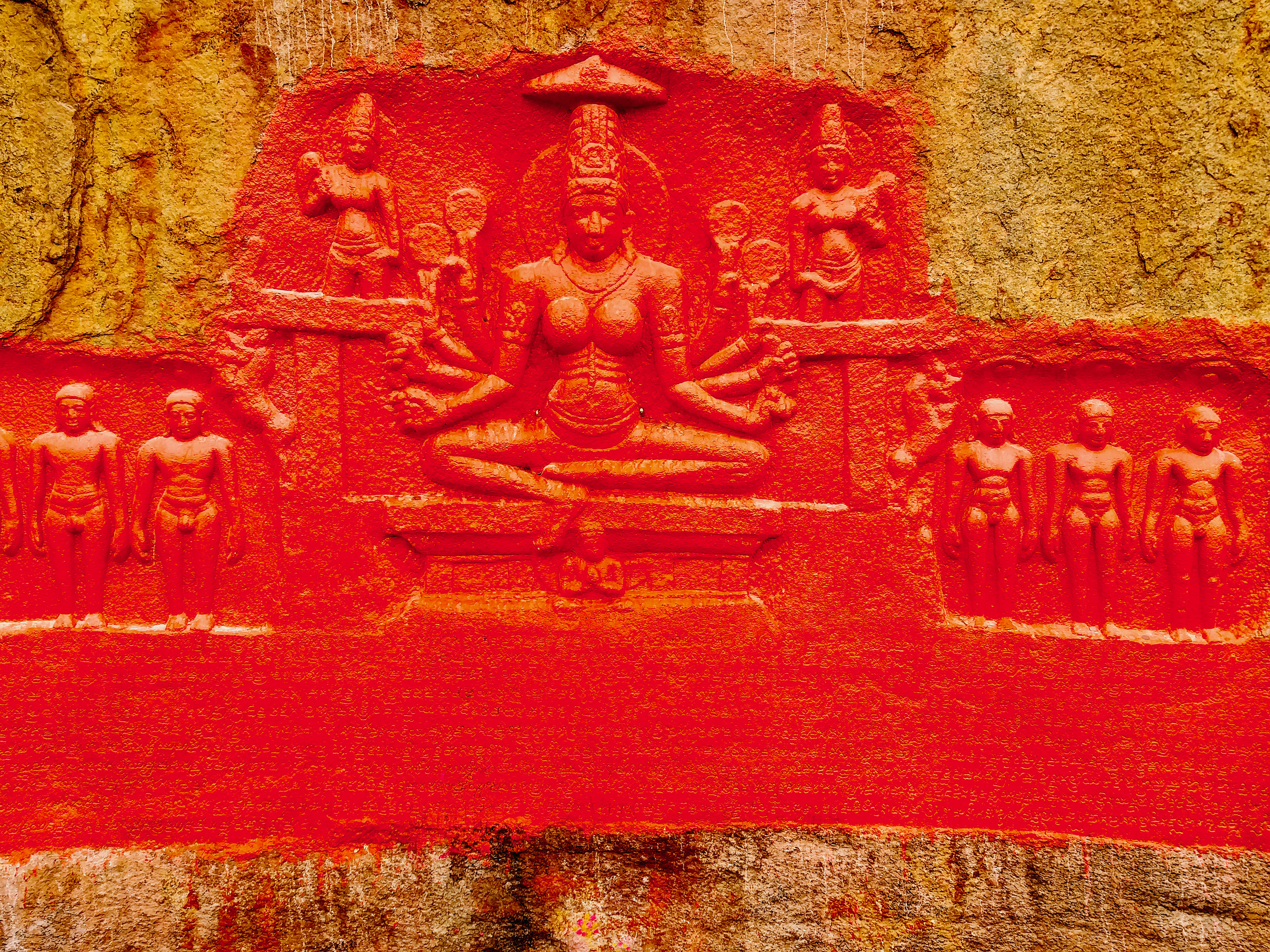
- Goddess Chakreshvari relief on Bommalagutta

Religion
- Affiliation: Jainism
- Deity: Chakreshvari
- Festival: Mahavir Jayanti

Location
- Location: Karimnagar, Telangana
- Interactive map of Bommalagutta
- Coordinates: 18°33′13″N 79°00′55″E

Architecture
- Style: Dravidian
- Creator: Jina Vallabha
- Funded by: Arikesari II
- Established: 945 CE

Specifications
- Temple: 1
- Monument: 1
- Materials: Rock cut

Bommalagutta (also known as Siddhula Gutta, Bommalamma Talli Gutta and Vrushabhadri Hill) is a Jain centre situated near Kurikyala village of Karimnagar district in Telangana.

== Etymology ==
Bommalammagutta means "Hill of figures" in Telugu. It is named in reference to the Bommalu (figures) carved on this hillock. As per an inscription, the site was originally known as Siddhasila or Siddhula Gutta meaning "Hill of the enlightened". It was named in reference to the Siddhas carved on the hillock.

== History ==
Bommalammagutta was constructed during the reign of Arikesari II of Vemulawada Chalukya. According to an inscription dated 945 CE, poet Jinavallabha, brother of noted Kannada poet Adikavi Pampa, installed stone images of Bharata, Bahubali and Rishabhanatha. The famous trilingual inscription is a 25 feet (7.6 m) inscription having 11 lines as a tribute to the kingdom for recognising poets. The inscription has verses composed in Kannada, Telugu and Sanskrit. This inscription is of utmost importance to Kannada and Telugu languages. It is written in three languages viz Kannada, Telugu and Sanskrit. The Kannada portion contains invaluable information about Pampa. The Telugu portion is the oldest Telugu Kanda Padya. They are one of the important historical evidences, submitted to the Centre, for securing classic language status to Telugu. The inscription also mentions the construction of Tribhuvanatilaka Basadi by Jinavallabha. The top of the hill was used by Jain monks for meditation.

== Architecture ==
The temple is famous for stone carving image of Chakreshvari with eight arms under two Bahubali images. Her iconography here includes Garuda. The bas-reliefs and the inscription have been painted over in red by the state officials in recent years for preservation and highlighting it. There is a total of eight Tirthankaras carved on the hillock. The hill still preserves a few small Jain caves without any carvings.

Tribhuvanatilaka Basadi exists near the Jain reliefs of Bommalammagutta. This temple houses idols of Rishabhanatha and Mahavira. A tank called Kavitagunarnava and a garden named Madanvilas is also part of the temple premises.

== Gallery ==
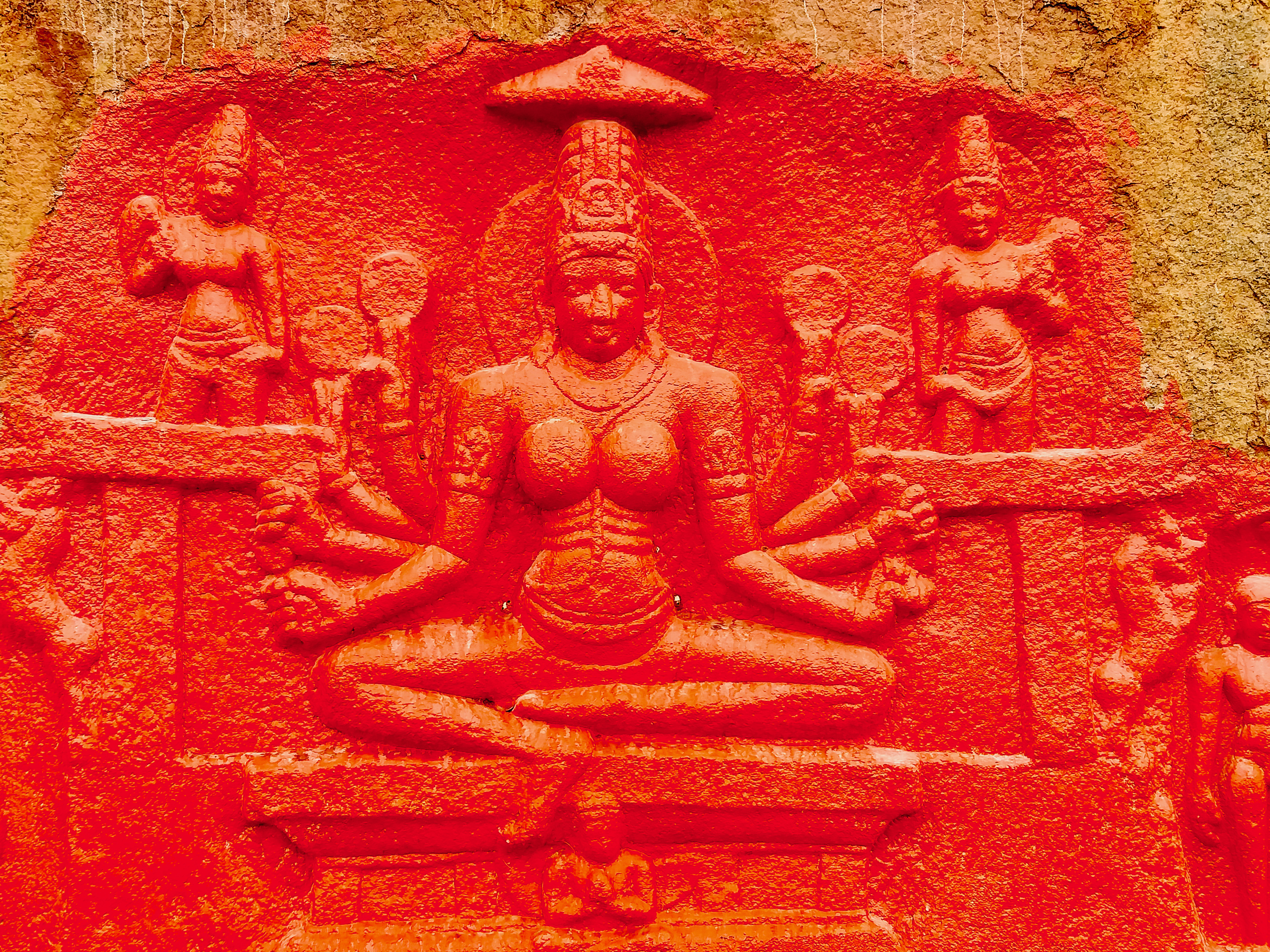
Chakreshvari

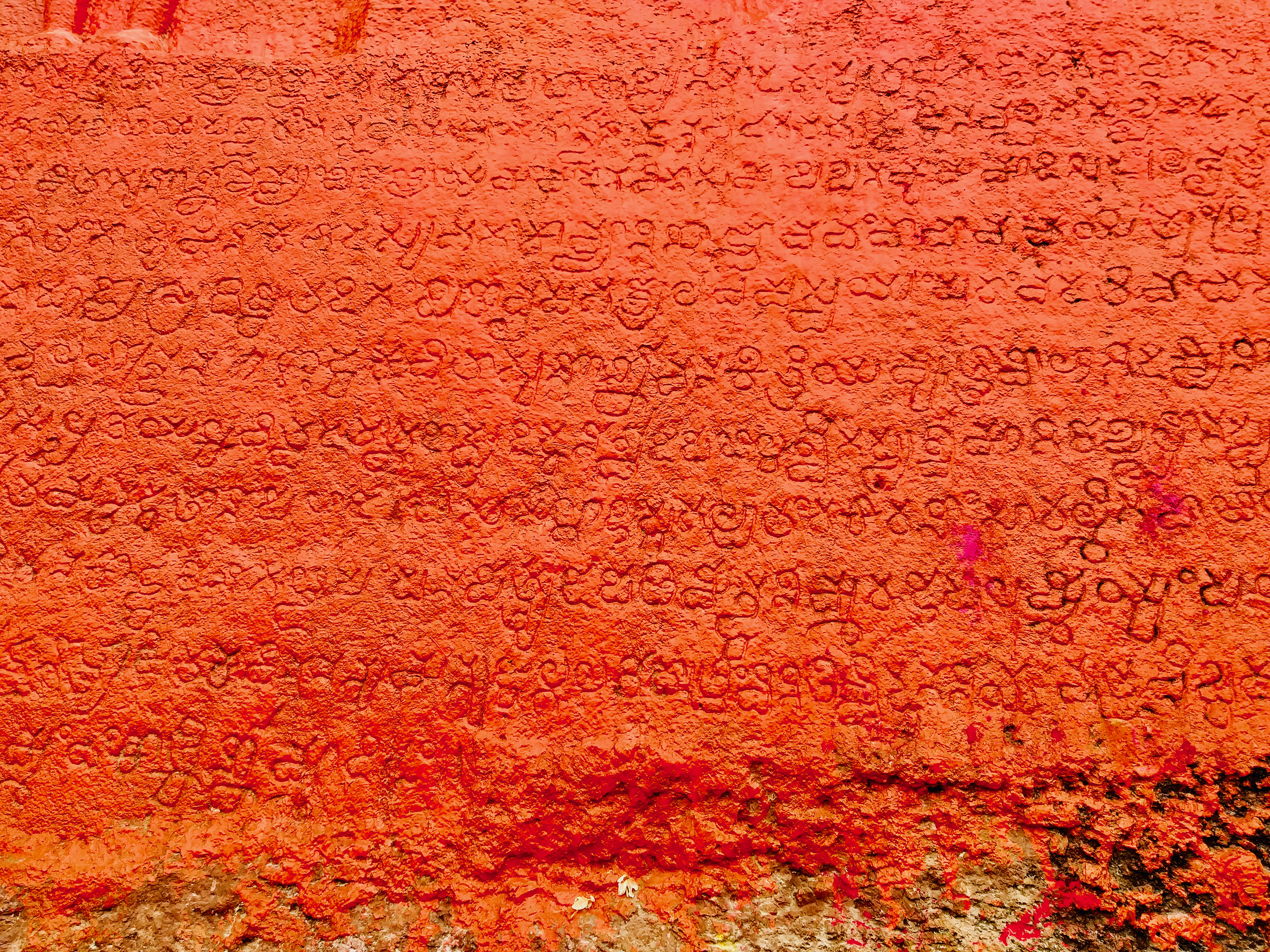
trilingual inscription

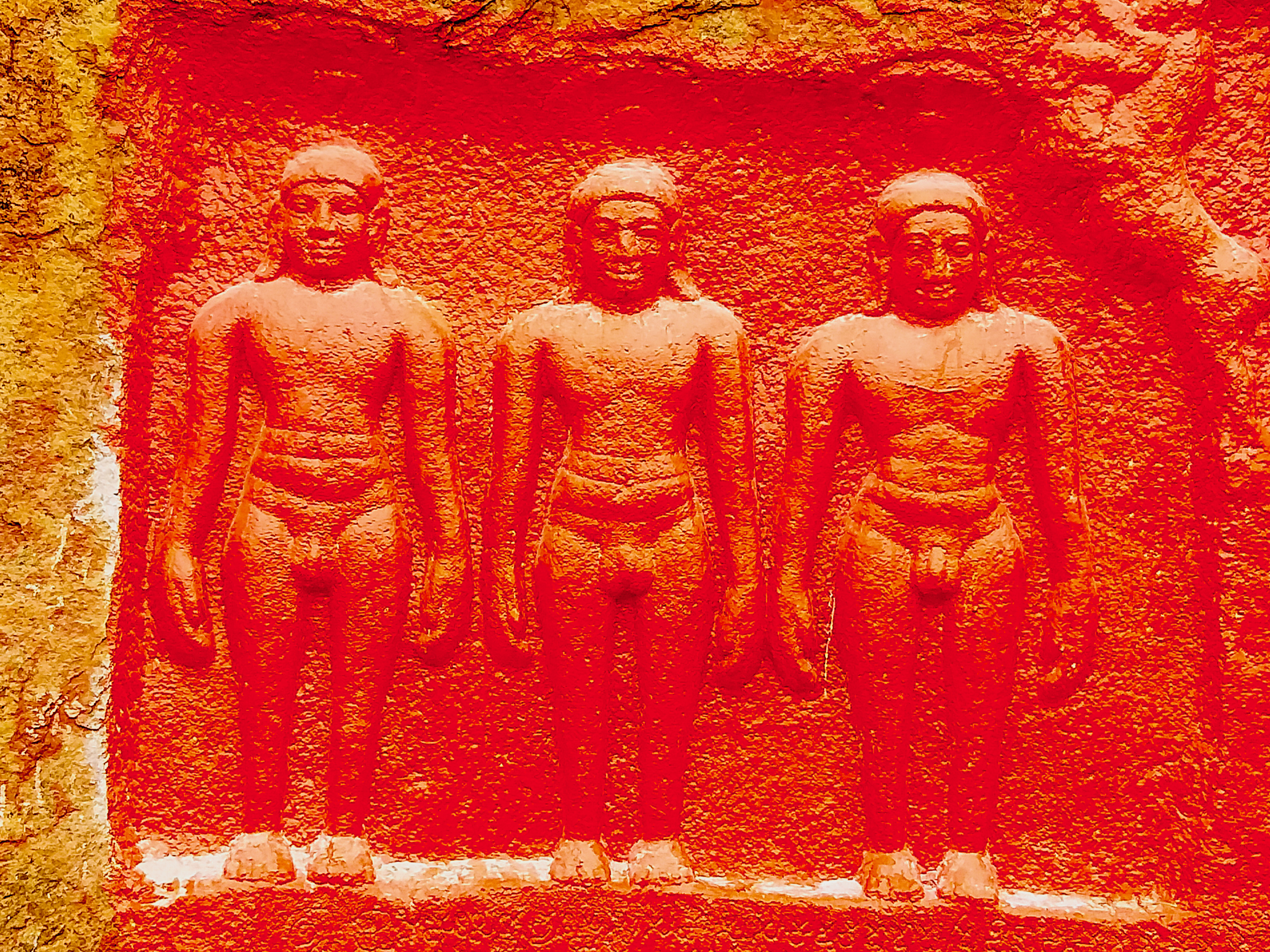
Tirthankaras

== Preservation ==
Over the last 100 years, Jain statues and reliefs are discovered from the area, are preserved in the Karimnagar museum.

== See also ==
- Kalugumalai Jain Beds
- Kulpakji
