= Arikesari II =

10th-century monarch in Telangana, India

Arikesari II (r. c. 930-955) was a ruler of the Vemulavada Chalukya dynasty of present-day Telangana, India. A Rashtrakuta vassal, he played an important role in dethroning the Rashtrakuta emperor Govinda IV and enthroning Amoghavarsha III as the new emperor. He was the patron of Pampa, one of the earliest notable Kannada-language poets.

== Early life ==
Arikesari was a son of his predecessor Narasimha II. A verse in the Vikramarjuna Vijayam, composed by the Chalukya court poet Pampa, states that Arikesari had Indra's shoulder as his cradle. According to one theory, this may mean that Arikesari's mother Jakavve was a daughter of the Rashtrakuta king Indra III. While this is plausible, no direct evidence supports this hypothesis.

According to the Parbhani copper plate inscription, Arikesari II married two Rashtrakuta princesses - Revakanirmadi (the daughter of Indra III) and Lokambika.

== Rebellion against Govinda ==
Arikesari's father Narasimha had served the Rashtrakuta king Indra III as a feudatory. After Indra's death around c. 928–929, his eldest son Amoghavarsha II succeeded him, but the younger son Govinda IV usurped the throne shortly after. Govinda subjugated the Chalukyas of Vengi, whose former feudatories, such as the Chalukyas of Mudugonda, rose against him. Govinda dispatched an army led by his general Rajamayya against Mudugonda, forcing its Chalukya ruler Vijayaditya (alias Bijja) to flee. The records of Arikesari's family state that he gave shelter to Vijayaditya, and protected him from Govinda-raja (that is, Govinda IV). The Vengi Chalukyas, led by Bhima II, ultimately expelled the Rashtrakuta invaders, killing Rajamayya in the process.

Govinda, displeased with Arikesari for having given asylum to Vijayaditya, sent an army led by Pandyaraya against Vemulavada. Arikesari's Vemulavada inscription and his court poet Pampa's Vikramarjuna Vijayam state that he defeated a large army headed by the maha-samanta ("great feudatory") sent by the emperor Gojjiga (identified with Govinda IV).

Arikesari formed an alliance with Govinda's paternal uncle Baddega-deva (later Amoghavarsha III), a rival claimant to the Rashtrakuta throne. Baddega had been living in the Tripuri Kalachuri kingdom ruled by Yuvarajadeva, whose sister was the grandmother of Baddega. Baddega was also supported by the Ganga prince Butuga, who wanted to dethrone his own brother Rajamalla III from the Ganga throne.

According to the Vemulavada records, Arikesari gave asylum to Baddega against Govinda's wishes. Baddega and his son Krishna III arrived at Vemulavada, where they were probably joined by other enemies of Govinda. Subsequently, Baddega's forces defeated Govinda's army in a battle, and Baddega ascended the Rashtrakuta throne, assuming the title Amoghavarsha. The Vemulavada dynasty's records state that Govinda invaded Vemulavada because Arikesari gave shelter to Baddega: Arikesari not only repulsed the imperial invasion, but also dethroned the emperor, and handed over the empire to Baddega.

== Conflict with Bappuva ==
The records of Arikesari's family state Arikesari single-handedly repulsed an invasion by an ankakara of Bappuva, the younger brother of Kakkala. The identity of Bappuva and Kakkala is not certain, but they were most probably enemies of Arikesari's overlord Amoghavarsha III, and Arikesari appears to have defeated them on the orders of the emperor. Some earlier scholars identified Kakkala as the Rashtrakuta king Kakkala II (Karka II), but this is not correct, as Kakkala II ascended the Rashtrakuta throne much later, in 972.

A Shilahara grant inscription mentions one Karkara, who was overthrown by Amoghavarsha III. However, there is no concrete evidence to suggest that this Karkara was same as Kakkala: he is not known to have had a brother named Bappuva.

The 940 Deoli inscription states that Krishna III, the son and successor of Amoghavarsha III, killed a chief named Bappuka. The name "Bappuka" may be a variant of "Bappuva", but this Bappuka is not known to have had a brother named Kakkala. Therefore, his identification as Arikesari's enemy is not certain either.

== Cultural activities ==
Arikesari's court poet Pampa composed the Kannada-language text Vikramarjuna Vijaya. The text contains Pampa's version of a Mahabharata story with the legendary warrior Arjuna as its hero: the poet identifies Arjuna with his patron Arikesari.

== Legacy ==
=== Vemulavada inscription ===
Arikesari is attested by an undated Sanskrit-language inscription issued during his reign, discovered at Vemulavada. The inscription states that his minister Peddanarya built a sun (Aditya) temple at Vemulavada, and that Arikesari granted a pice of land to this temple, at the request of Baddiga-deva (his overlord Amoghavarsha III). The land was donated The donated land was used to build a feeding house for the pilgrims visiting the temple. The temple mentioned in the inscription does not exist anymore.

According to the inscription, Peddanarya was Arikesari's tantra-pala (minister of the army); his father Nagamarya was the tantra-pala of Arikesari's overlord Amoghavarsha. The inscription also mentions another office named Gunamkusha, who held the office of sandhi-vigrahi (minister of war and peace) in Arikesari's administration.

The inscription provides Arikesari's genealogy, starting from his ancestor Vinayaditya Yuddhamalla. It describes the achievements of the dynasty's rulers, and the political events from Arikesari's reign.

The inscription states that Arikesari bore the titles Pambarankusham, Ammana-gandhavaranam, Gandhebha-Vidyadharam, Arudha-Sarvajnan, Udatta-narayanan, Nodutti-gevlon, Guna-nidhi, Gunarnava, Sharanagata-vajrapanjara, Priyagalla, Tribhuvana-malla, and Samanta-Chudamani. The title Tribhuvana-malla was later assumed by the Kalyani Chalukya kings.

=== Kurikyala inscription ===
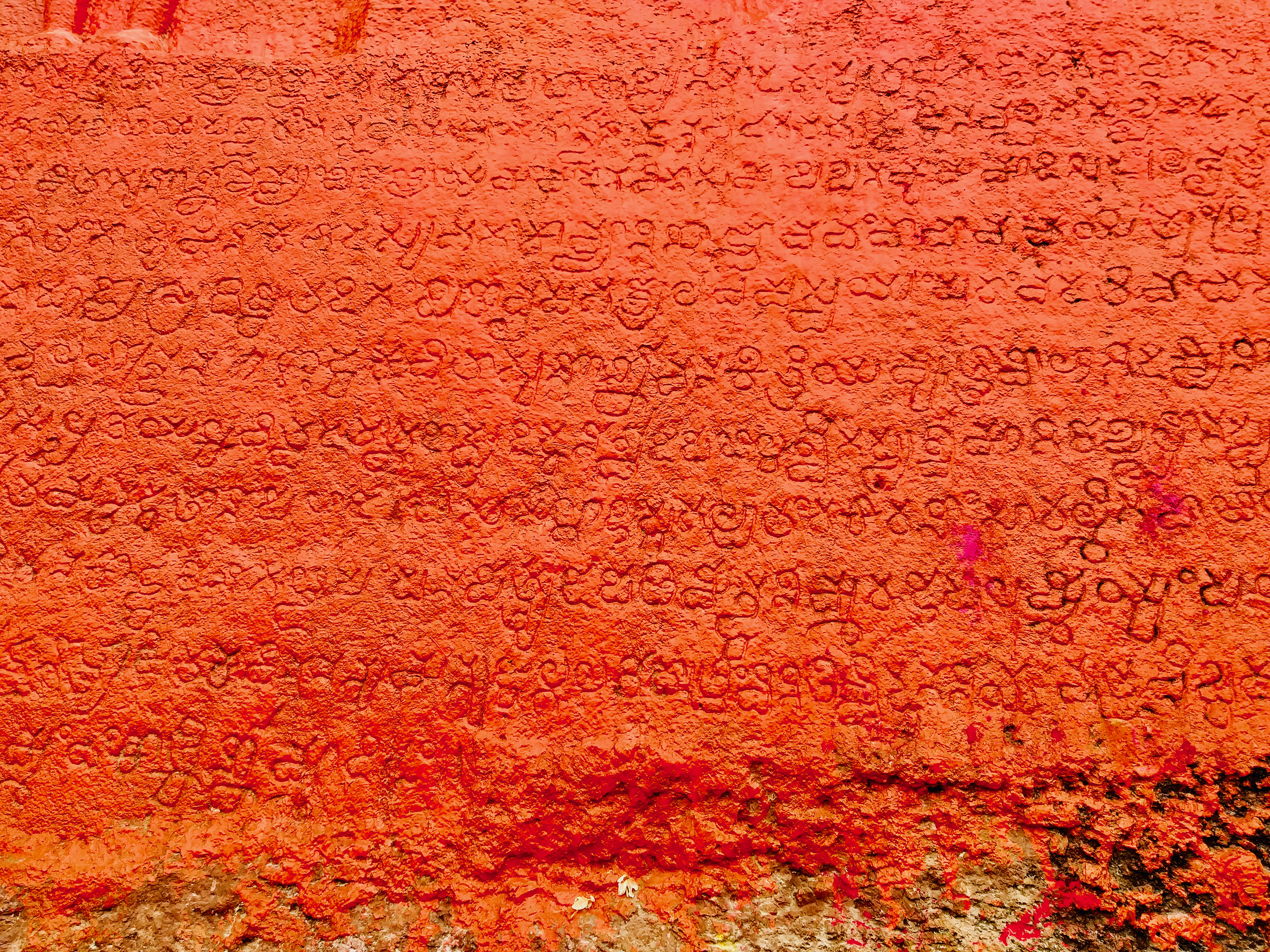
Kurikyala inscription, Bommalagutta

Another undated inscription from Arikesari's reign was found at the Kurikyala (or Kurkyala) village in Karimnagar district. This inscription features Sanskrit, Kannada and Telugu languages. It records the construction of a Jain shrine (basadi) by Jinavallabha, the younger brother of Arikesari's court poet Pampa. The inscription states that Jinavallabha commissioned a shrine named Tribhuvana-tilaka, a tank named Kavita-gunarnava, and a garden named Madana-vilasa; he also installed the images of the first and the last Jain tirthankaras at the shrine. In addition, it provides information about the origin and genealogy of Pampa's family.

=== Successors ===
Arikesari had two sons: Vagaraja and Bhadradeva (alias Baddega-Narasinga; son of Lokambika), who were half-brothers. Vagaraja (r. c. 941–950) and Bhadradeva (r. c. 941–946) appear to have ruled simultaneously for a few years, and after them, the throne was occupied by Bhadradeva's son Arikesari III (r. c. 946–968).
