= Indra III =

Rashtrakuta emperor from 914 to 929

- Maharajadhiraja; Parameshvara; Shri-prithvi-vallabha; Nithyavarsha; Raja-marthanda; Ratta-kandarapa; Kirthi-narayana

Rashtrakuta Emperor
- Reign: c. 914 – c. 929
- Coronation: 24 February 915, Kurundaka
- Predecessor: Krishna II
- Successor: Amoghavarsha II
- Born: Manyakheta, Rashtrakuta Empire (modern day Karnataka, India)
- Died: c. 929; Manyakheta, Rashtrakuta Empire (modern day Karnataka, India)
- Consort: Vijambha
- Issue: Amoghavarsha II; Govinda IV
- Father: Jagattunga
- Mother: Lakshmi
- Religion: Jainism

Indra III (died 929) was the Rashtrakuta emperor from 914 until his death in 929. He was the grandson of Krishna II and son of Chedi princess Lakshmi. He ascended the imperial throne after the early demise of his father Jagattunga. He had many titles such as Nithyavarsha, Rattakandarapa, Rajamarathanda and Kirthinarayana. He patronised Kannada Jain poet and commander Sri Vijaya and Sanskrit poet Trivikrama. Indra III was married to princess Vijamba of the Kalachuri dynasty of central India (Chedi).

== Capture of Kannauj ==
Immediately after coming to power, Indra III had to fight a Paramara ruler, a feudatory of the Gurjara-Pratihara and routed him out of Govardhana near Nasik. Thereafter the Paramaras became feudatories of the Rashtrakutas. The Gurjara Pratihara ruler Mahendrapala I was experiencing some family feuds and this gave Indra III an opportunity to attack Kannauj in the Ganges - Yamuna doab. Kannauj at this time was under the control of the Pratihara empire. From the writings of Kannada poet Adikavi Pampa it is known that Indra III sent his feudatory, Chalukya king Narasimha II of Vemulavada, in pursuit of Mahipala I the incumbent Gurjara emperor who fled the area. Kannauj was "completely destroyed", and the Pratihara ruler weakened. The northern campaign of Indra III produced more dramatic results then during the rule of Dhruva Dharavarsha and Govinda III as the Rashtrakutas were actually able to hold Kannauj until c. 916.

== Trouble in Vengi ==
A civil war like situation prevailed in Vengi after the defeat of Eastern Chalukya Bhima at the hands of Baddega, a Rashtrakuta feudatory from Vemulavada. A period of intense politics continued when the Rashtrakutas tried to install the king of their choice in Vengi. Indra III's Jain general Sri Vijaya (who was also a poet) won many wars for his emperor in the eastern Deccan and the bulk of Vengi was brought under the rule of Indra III for a few years.

== Religion ==
Indra III is prominently recognized as a patron of Jainism. According to inscriptions, he commissioned a stone pedestal for Basadis and supported Jain monastic institutions through grants and temple patronage. The dynasty is renowned for its sustained support of Jain monks, temples, and scholars across the Deccan region. Historian Suryanatha Kamath claims the Rashtrakuta rulers Despite their strong Jain leanings, also supported Hinduism

His reign oversaw flourishing "Jain tirthas" in Andhra and Karnataka, as evidenced by active devotional and endowment practices toward Jain shrines. He also strengthened dynastic ties with the Kalachuris of Tripuri—known for their Jain patronage—through marriage to a Kalachuri princess. Notably, Indra III's court included the famous Jain general and poet Sri Vijaya, who contributed significantly to the literary culture of the time.

== Bibliography ==
- Sastri, Nilakanta K.A. (2002) [1955]. A history of South India from prehistoric times to the fall of Vijayanagar. New Delhi: Indian Branch, Oxford University Press. ISBN 0-19-560686-8.
- Kamath, Suryanath U. (2001) [1980]. A concise history of Karnataka : from pre-historic times to the present. Bangalore: Jupiter books. LCCN 80905179. OCLC 7796041.
- Reu, Pandit Bisheshwar Nath (1997) [1933]. History of The Rashtrakutas (Rathodas). Jaipur: Publication scheme. ISBN 81-86782-12-5.
