= Vinayaditya of Podana =

Vinayaditya (r. c. 750-775 CE) alias Yuddhamalla I, was an Indian ruler from the Vemulavada Chalukya dynasty. He was most probably a vassal of the Rashtrakuta king Dantidurga, and his capital was likely located at Podana (modern Bodhan); his successors moved the capital to Vemulavada.

== Rule over Sapadalaksha ==
Location of Vemulavada (Vemulawada) in modern India

A Vemulavada inscription states that Vinayaditya ruled over the Sapadalaksha country, which could not be governed by others. The Sanskrit term "Sapadalaksha" (or "Savalakhkhe" in vernacular, literally "125,000 [villages or revenue units]") has been used to describe several distinct regions in the early medieval Indian records, including the Sapadalaksha area in present-day Rajasthan.

Some scholars, including N Venkataramanayya identify the Sapadalaksha of the Vemulavada inscription with the Sapadalaksha of present-day Rajasthan. According to this theory, Vinayaditya probably accompanied his overlord Dantidurga during the Rashtrakuta campaigns against the Gurjara-Pratiharas, and controlled a part of Rajasthan during the Rashtrakuta occupation of that territory. The Vemulavada inscription also credits Vinayaditya with conquering the reputedly inaccessible Chitrakuta fort, although other records of the dynasty, such as the Vikramarjuna Vijayam and the Parbhani copper-plate inscription, do not mention this conquest. According to Venkataramanayya, it is possible that the conquered fort was the modern Chittor Fort (originally called "Chitrakuta"), located in the ancient Sapadalaksha region.

However, other scholars, including Madhusudan Dhaky and Jaisetty Ramanaiah, identify the Sapadalaksha of the Vemulavada inscription with Kosavalam Savalakhe, a historical region in present-day Telangana. This region was centered around Podana (modern Bodhan), which was probably Vinayaditya's capital. The Vemulavada inscription states that Vinayaditya had his elephants bathed in a reservoir filled with oil, at Podana. Pampa's Vikramarjuna Vijayam similarly states that he had 500 elephants bathed in several dirghikas (ponds) filled with oil.

== Purported conquests ==
The Kollipara copper-plate inscription attributed to Vinayaditya's son Arikesari I portrays him as a great conqueror, but this inscription is of doubtful authenticity. It states that Vinayaditya subjugated several kingdoms including Turushka, Yavana, Kashmira, Kambhoja, Magadha, Malava, Kalinga, Ganga, Pallava, Pandya, and Kerala. These claims of conquests are grossly exaggerated, and other records of the dynasty ignore these supposed conquests. It is possible that Vinayaditya participated in the military campaigns of his overlord Dantidurga, whose Ellora Dashavatara cave inscription credits the Rashtrakuta king with defeating the kings of Kalinga, Malava, and other kingdoms.

== Successors ==
Vinayaditya had two sons, Arikesari I and Biragriha; Arikesari succeeded him on the throne.
