= Narasimha II =

- Narasimha II may refer to any of the following Indian rulers:
- Narasimha II of Vemulavada, a 10th-century Rashtrakuta vassal king from the Chalukya dynasty of Vemulavada
- Vira Narasimha II, a 13th-century Hoysala king
- Narasimha Raya II, a 16th-century Saluva king of Vijayanagara
