= Ponna (poet) =

10th century Kannada poet

- Born: Ponna; 10th century
- Died: 10th or 11th century CE
- Occupation: Kannada Poet
- Notable work: "Jinaksharamale" "Bhuvanaika-Ramabhyudaya" "Shantipurana" (Shantinatha purana)
- Title: "UbhayakaviChakravarti" "Kavi-chakravarthi"

Ponna (c. 945) was a noted Kannada poet in the court of Rashtrakuta Emperor Krishna III (r. 939–968 CE). The emperor "Krishna III" honoured Ponna with the title - "Ubhaya Kavichakravarthi " (emperor among poets) because of his command over both Kannada and Sanskrit. and for their rich poetic imagery, devotion to Jain themes, and courtly refinement. Ponna is often considered one among the "three gems of Kannada literature" ("Ratnatraya"), lit meaning "Three gems"; Adikavi Pampa and Ranna being the other two) for ushering it in full panoply. According to the scholar R. Narasimhacharya, Ponna is known to have claimed superiority over all the poets of the time. According to scholars Nilakanta Shastri and E.P. Rice, Ponna belonged to Punganur, now in Andhra Pradesh, but later migrated to Manyakheta (in present-day Kalaburagi district, Karnataka), the Rashtrakuta capital. He is best remembered for his classic Jain puranas such as "Shantipurana" (shantinatha purana}, which narrates the life of Shantinatha, the 16th Tirthankara of Jainism, and Bhuvanaika-Ramabhyudaya, a eulogistic poem on his patron king.

== Writings ==
His most famous extant works in Kannada are "Shantipurana " (shantinatha purana), written in champu style (mixed prose-verse classical composition style inherited from Sanskrit), "Bhuvanaika-Ramabhyudaya", a eulogical writing, and "Jinaksharamale", a "Jain Purana" and an acrostic poem written in praise of noted Jain saints and Tirthankars ("Jainas") in 39 chapters ("kandas"). Ramakatha, a writing based on the Hindu epic Ramayana, of which only a few stanzas are available is also attributed to Ponna. Historians Kamath and Shastri are not certain whether his extinct classic, Gatapratiagata, is in Kannada or Sanskrit. However, according to the professor L.S. Sheshagiri Rao of the Sahitya Akademi, the writing is in Kannada and belongs to the genre of "literary exercise".

"Shantipurana" is an important Jain purana, and a eulogy of the 16th Jain Tirthankara, Shantinatha Swami. It was written to commemorate the attainment of nirvana ("salvation") of a Jain guru called Jainachandra Deva. The writing comprises twelve sections (ashwasas) of which nine sections focus on Shantinatha's eleven previous births, and the remaining three sections give biographical details of the protagonist. In this writing, Ponna borrowed significantly from previous works of the Sanskrit poet Kalidasa though he does rise to great heights in his narration justifying his claim to scholarship (Vidwat Kavi). Ponna also seems to have used as a source, a narrative poem written by a Kannada poet called Asaga, whose works are now extinct. Ponna's claim that his work is superior to that of Asaga gives us information that the latter must have been considered an important poet of that era.

Scholars were divided about Ponna's protagonist in Bhuvanaika-Ramabhyudaya. The scholar D.L. Narasimhachar had opined that Ponna had eulogised Shankaraganda, a vassal king under emperor Krishna III. This opinion was based on the fact that Shankaraganda held the honorific Bhuvanaikarama. However, modern Kannada poet Govinda Pai argued in his 1936 article, Ponnana Bhuvanaikaramanu yaru ("Who was Ponna's Bhuvanaikarama"?), that king Shankaraganda being a Jain by faith could not have been the central figure in a secular writing and that emperor Krishna III also held the same title. Later, the scholar D.L. Narasimhachar confirmed the validity of Govinda Pai's findings.

== Influence and style ==
Ponna was one of the most-notable writers of the classical age of Kannada literature, a period usually categorised as starting from the middle of 10th century and lasting for about a hundred and fifty years thereafter. During this era, Ponna and two other poets, Adikavi Pampa and Ranna, produced works of lasting merit, writings that set a standard in poetic form and composition that would influence future poets for centuries. So adept were these poets that their style of champu brought together the best of the earlier masters of Sanskrit literature in various proportions, giving their narration an artificiality: poet Bana's prose, Kalidasa's graceful verses, Bhatta Narayana's dramaticism and Megaduta's lyrical flavour are seen used deftly giving naturalised and assimilated Sanskrit words in the Kannada language priority over native (desi) expressions. Despite adherence to strict classical Sanskritic models (margam), the native composition styles of Kannada language, such as the tripadi (three-line verse), are found distributed in the narratives poems of these poets. Just as Ponna eulogised his patron emperor Krishna III as Bhuvanaikarama, so did the other Jain poets of the classical age. Kannada writings by them used impressive Sanskrit-derived verses interspersed with prose to extol the virtues of their protagonists, who were often compared to heroes from the Hindu epics. While Adikavi Pampa (Pampa Bharata, c. 941) compared his patron, the feudatory Chalukya king Arikesari, to Pandava prince Arjuna, in his version of the Mahabharata, Ranna (c. 983) found it suitable to compare his patron, Chalukya King Satyashraya, to Pandava prince Bhima.
