= Arikesari I =

Indian ruler

Arikesari I (r. c. 775–800 CE) was an Indian ruler from the Vemulavada Chalukya dynasty. He was a vassal of the Rashtrakuta king Dhruva Dharavarsha and appears to have helped his overlord subjugate the Vengi Chalukya ruler Vishnuvardhana IV.

== Reign ==
Arikesari was a son of his predecessor Vinayaditya; he had a brother named Biragriha.

The records of Arikesari's successors state that he conquered the kingdoms of Vengi and Trikalinga during the reign of his overlord Nirupama-deva, who can be identified as the Rashtrakuta king Dhruva Dharavarsha. Dhruva had ascended the throne after a war of succession against his brother Govinda II, who had been supported by the Vengi Chalukya king Vishnuvardhana IV. It appears that after consolidating his power, Dhruva sent an army led by Arikesari to chastise Vishnuvardhana, whose territories included Vengi and Trikalinga. Vishnuvardhana later negotiated peace, and married his daughter Shila-mahadevi to Dhruva.

It was probably Arikesari, who moved the dynasty's capital from Podana (modern Bodhan) to Vemulavada. He was succeeded by his son Narasimha I.

== Inscription ==
The undated Kollipara copper-plate inscription, assigned to 9th century, records a village grant made by Arikesari to the religious leader Mugdha-shivacharya. However, its authenticity of the inscription is doubtful, because it provides a false genealogy of the dynasty, and a verse in it suggests that it was written in year 4121 of the Kali Yuga (1019-20 CE), half a century after the Vemulavada Chalukya dynasty came to an end.

The inscription comprises 5 copper-plates, and is written in Sanskrit language using the Telugu-Kannada script. It includes 18 verses in various metres, including four imprecatory verses at the end, and three prose passages describing the village boundaries.

The inscription states that Arikesari was a member of the Lunar dynasty, and names his ancestors as follows: Satyashraya Rana-Vikrama, Prithvipati, Maharaja, Rajaditya, and Vinayaditya. It then describes Vinayaditya as a great conqueror, before whom kings of several kingdoms bowed.

The inscription describes Arikesari as a just king and a skilled archer, who bore the titles Samasta-lokashraya, Tribhuvana-malla, Raja-trinetra, and Sahasa-rama. It states that he was a learned man, who was proficient in grammar, law, medicine, and gaja-tantra. The inscription describes Arikesari's grant as a vida-dana ("gift for imparting education").

The record names the donee Mugdha-shivacharya as a disciple of Sadyassivacharya of Arikuta gurukula, which was probably a branch of the Kalamukha sect. It states that Mugdha-shivacharya lived at Elishvara (modern Yeleswaram in Nalgonda district), and survived on a diet of only vegetables.

The name of the granted village was Belmoga, which was located in the Ramadu-vishaya (province). It was located to the south of the Urige village, and at the centre of the Tuvatoru, Parivaturla, Pulcheruval, and Potuvodupi villages.
