= Trikalinga =

Region in India

Trikalinga (lit. 'The Three Kalingas') is a historical region of central-east India, mentioned in several historical sources. Its identification and its relation to the term "Kalinga" is debated among modern historians, who variously identify it as a distinct region to the west of Kalinga, a larger region comprising Kalinga and two other regions, a constituent of the greater Kalinga, or the three divisions of Kalinga proper.

The rulers of two ancient Indian dynasties - the eastern Gangas and the Somavamshis claimed the title Trikalingadhipati ("Lord of Trikalinga"). The Tripuri Kalachuris apparently also adopted the title after military successes in the region, and a Chandela king adopted it after military successes against the Kalachuris. In addition, the Chalukyas of Vengi claimed to rule over Trikalinga.

== Historical records ==
=== Eastern Gangas ===
The earliest extant record to mention the term Trikalinga is the 537 CE Jirjingi inscription of the Eastern Ganga king Indra-varman I. The next record is the 562 CE Ponnuturu inscription of his successor Samanta-varman. Both these inscriptions describe the kings as Trikalingadhipati ("Lord of Trikalinga").

There is no record of any subsequent Eastern Ganga king claiming the title Trikalingadhipati until the 11th century. Three later Eastern Ganga kings claimed the title: Vajra-hasta V Ananta-varman, Rajaraja I Devendra-varman, and Ananta-varman Choda-ganga. The inscriptions of these kings use the term Trikalinga-mahibhuj ("Kings of Trikalinga") for the Eastern Ganga kings in general. The inscriptions of Ananta-varman Choda-ganga state that Kamarnava-deva, the progenitor of the Ganga dynasty, was the founder of the Trikalinga country.

=== Somavamshis ===
The Somavamshis probably descended from the Panduvamshis of Dakshina Kosala, who called themselves Kosaladhipati ("Lord of Kosala"). The 9th century Somavamshi king Maha-bhava-gupta Janamejaya I moved eastwards, from Kosala towards Kalinga, and claimed the title Trikalingadhipati in his inscriptions issued from a town called Suvarnapura. He seems to have conquered a part of the Trikalinga region, as his inscriptions do not use this title for his father Shiva-gupta. His successors also claimed this title.

The wife of the Bhanja king Vidyadhara of Vanjulvaka was known as Trikalinga Mahadevi: she was probably a Somavamshi princess.

=== Kalachuris of Tripuri ===
The 11th century Kalachuri king Karna claimed the title Trikalingadhipati in the Varanasi inscription issued during the first year of his reign, as well as several later inscriptions. According to historian V.V. Mirashi, it is possible that Karna inherited this title from his father Gangeya, who may have claimed it after a successful campaign in the Trikalinga region.

The 10th century poet Raja-shekhara uses the title Trilingadhipati ("Lord of Trilinga") for the earlier Kalachuri king Yuvaraja-deva I, in Viddha-shalabhanjika. Mirashi speculates this to be a mistake for Trikalingadhipati, but historian A.M. Shastri disputes this pointing out that "Trilinga" is known to be a distinct geographical region.

Karna's successors also claimed the title Trikalingadhipati; these include Yashah-karna, Nara-simha, Jaya-simha, and Vijaya-simha.

=== Other dynasties ===
The 966 CE Parbhani inscription of the Vemulavada Chalukya chief Arikesari III states that his ancestor Yuddha-malla ruled over Vengi and the three Kalingas (sa-Kalinga-trayim Vengim), although this record does not use the exact term "Trikalinga".

Several Vengi Chalukya inscriptions suggest that Trikalinga was a part of their territory. For example:

- The Masulipatnam inscription of Amma I states that his predecessor Vijayaditya IV (918 CE) ruled over the Vengi region (mandala) and the Trikalinga forest.
- The Kolavennu (or Kolavaram) inscription of Bhima II states that Vikramaditya II (later than 925 CE) ruled over the Vengi region and Trikalinga.
  - The Arumbaka inscription of Badapada suggests that Amma II (c. 945-970 CE) ruled over Vengi and Trikalinga.

The 1297 CE Rewa inscription of Kumara-pala of Kakaredika uses the title Trikalingadhipati for his overlord, the Chandela king Trailokya-varman, who did not actually rule the Trikalinga region. Kumara-pala was originally a Kalachuri vassal, and later shifted his allegiance to the Chandelas. Historian A.M. Shastri theorizes that he erroneously applied the various Kalachuri titles including Trikalingadhipati to his new overlord. According to historian P.K. Mishra, the Chandela king adopted the Kalachuri titles after conquering a part of the former Kalachuri territory.

== Hints for identification ==
Places known to be located in Trikalinga from inscriptions

Epigraphic and literary sources offer several hints for the identification of Trikalinga:

- The following places were located in Trikalinga:
  - Mukhalingam: An inscription from this place mentions the existence of a temple dedicated to Trikalinga-deva there.
  - Kalingapatnam: The 1114-1115 CE (Shaka 1036) inscription from this place records the gift of a lamp to the god of Trikalinga-pattana ("Trikalinga port-town"). A 1152-1153 CE (Shaka 1074) inscription refers to this place as simply Pattana ("port town"). Based on this, historian A.M. Shastri theorizes that this was the only port town in the Trikalinga region.
  - Ramagiri: The colphon of Kalyana-karaka by Ugradityacharya (or Udgitacharya) states that this text was composed at Ramagiri in the Trikalinga country, a part of the territory of the ruler of Vengi. This Ramagiri can be identified with the Ramgiri located in the Koraput district of Odisha.
- Neighbouring regions:
  - Trikalinga must have bordered the core territories of the three major dynasties whose rulers claimed to Trikalingadhipati: the Eastern Gangas, the Somavamshis, and the Kalachuris.
  - Trikalinga either bordered or was very close to the Dakshina Kosala region, since the Somavamshi kings claimed to have ruled both these territories, as suggested by their titles Trikalingadhipati and Kosalendra ("Lord of Kosala").
  - Trikalinga bordered the Vengi region, as several Vengi Chalukya inscriptions suggest that their territory included Vengi and Trikalinga.
- Trikalinga was located in Dakshinapatha according to an inscription of the Vengi Chalukya king Gunaga Vijayaditya III.
- Danta-pura was the capital of Trikalinga in the 6th century, as suggested by the 537 CE Jirjingi inscription of Indra-varman I.

The following sources suggest that Trikalinga and Kalinga were distinct regions:

- The Vengi Chalukya inscriptions mention Kalinga and Trikalinga separately.
- The 1358 CE Srirangam inscription of Mummadi Nayaka states that Trikalinga was bordered by Maharashtra in the west, Kalinga in the east, Kanyakubja kingdom in the north, and Pandya kingdom in the south. While the northern boundary mentioned here seems doubtful, the inscription clearly suggests that Trikalinga and Kalinga were two distinct regions.
- A palm leaf manuscript of the Brahmanda Purana at the Orissa State Museum defines Trikalinga as the region between the Jhanjhavati and the Vedavati (modern Indravati) rivers, and Kalinga as the region between the Rishikulya and the Jhanjhavati rivers. Shastri dismisses this portion of the manuscript as unreliable because it is incomplete, contains grammatical errors, and according to him, goes against the epigraphic evidence.

Some modern scholars have suggested that the term Trikalinga referred to three subdivisions of Kalinga: Kongoda, Odra and Utkala. However, the following sources suggest that these regions were considered distinct from Kalinga:

- The Maranjamura inscription mentions Kalinga, Kongoda and Utkala as distinct units.
- The Jatesinga-Dungri inscription of the Somavamshi king Maha-shiva-gupta III Yayati mentions Kalinga, Kongoda, and Utkala as three different regions in the same phrase. Thus, Kongoda and Utkala do not appear to be constituent units of Kalinga.
- The Talcher inscription of the Bhauma-Kara king Shivakara III states that his ancestor Shubhakara had subjugated Kalinga, which suggests that Kalinga was distinct from the Bhuama-kara territory of Utkala.
- Chinese traveller Xuanzang mentions Odra (U-cha or Oda), Kongoda (Kong-yu-to) and Kalinga as distinct kingdoms. He describes Odra and Kongoda as part of eastern India, and Kalinga as a part of southern India.
- 10th century poet Raja-shekhara describes Kalinga and Utkala as distinct regions.
- The Vigrahas of South Toshali (south of Mahanadi) claimed to rule over Kalinga-rashtra, while the Mudgalas of North Toshali (north of Mahanadi) claimed to rule over Utkala.

== Identification ==
According to the following scholars Trikalinga was different from Kalinga, and was located to the west of Kalinga:

- According to G. Ramdas, the term "Trikalinga" means "high or elevated or hilly Kalinga", and does not include the coastal region. He identifies Trikalinga as the Eastern Ghats region extending from the source of Mahanadi in the north to the source of the Languliya river in the south. Harekrushna Mahatab generally agrees with this theory, specifying the Rishikulya river as the northern boundary of Trikalinga.
- R.C. Majumdar similarly identifies Trikalinga as the hilly region to the west of Kalinga.
- D.C. Sircar favours the theory that Trikalinga refers to a distinct region lying between Kalinga and Dakshina Kosala (including Sambalpur area), although this cannot be said with certainty. Alternatively, he identifies Trikalinga with the eastern part of Dakshina Kosala.
- According to P.K. Mishra, Trikalinga was distinct from Kalinga, Utkala, and Kosala: it included parts of Sambalpur, Kalahandi, Balangir, and Koraput districts.
- V.V. Mirashi also considers Trikalinga distinct from Kalinga, Kongoda, Utkala, and Kosala.

According to following scholars, Trikalinga was a larger region comprising Kalinga as one of its constituents:

- According to Ganga Mohan Laskar, the Trikalinga region included Kalinga, some neighbouring districts, and Kosala.
- B.C. Mazumdar, Binayak Misra, and R.G. Basak identify the three Kalingas as the Kalinga proper, Kongoda, and Utkala.
- According to J.F. Fleet, the three Kalingas included probably the whole of present-day Odisha.

Similarly, the following scholars theorize that Trikalinga referred to the three divisions of Kalinga at its widest extent:

- According to H. C. Ray, Trikalinga refers to the wider extent of Kalinga, which includes parts of present-day Odisha, Chhattisgarh, and Andhra Pradesh.
- R.D. Banerji theorizes that Trikalinga refers to three divisions of Kalinga, which according to him extended from the Ganges delta in the north to Godavari delta in the south.
- R. Subba Rao identifies the three Kalingas as Utkala (north Kalinga), Kalinga proper, and Tel-Kalinga (Telangana or south Kalinga). Like Banerji, he theorizes that Kalinga extended from Ganges in the north to Godavari in the south.

According to following scholars, Trikalinga refers to three subdivisions of Kalinga proper:

- According to A.M. Shastri, sometime between first and sixth centuries, Kalinga region came to be divided into three parts, which were collectively known as Trikalinga. Several kings boasted to be Trikalingadhipati even if they controlled only a part of the Trikalinga region. Shastri identifies the three parts as follows, based on the hints given in historical records and natural boundaries (such as mountains and rivers):
  - North Kalinga: Bordered by the Mahanadi river in the north and west, and the Eastern Ghats in the south and east. This region included the northern part of Koraput, and the south-eastern region of Kalahandi.
  - South Kalinga: Bordered by the Indravati river in the west and the north-west, Godavari river in the south, and the Eastern Ghats in the east. This region included the southern portion of Koraput, a considerable part of Bastar, and a small region of north-west Srikakulam district.
  - Eastern Kalinga: Bordered in the west by the Eastern Ghats, the Mahanadi delta in the north, and the Godavari delta in the south. This region included eastern Srikakulam, Vishakhapatnam and Ganjam.
- D.C. Ganguly notes that the Eastern Ganga inscriptions mention the term Madhyama (middle) Kalinga. Based on this, he theorizes that Trikalinga refers to the three parts of Kalinga extending from Ganjam district in the north to Godavari-Vishakhapatnam districts in the south.

Some earlier scholars identified Trikalinga with the Telangana region. For example, Alexander Cunningham identified Trikalinga with the three kingdoms referred to as "Macco-Calingae", "Gangarides-Calingae", and "Calingae" by the first century Roman author Pliny. Cunningham identified these "three Kalingas" as Dhanakataka-Amaravati area, Andhra, and Kalinga proper. According to him, the term "Telangana" is a corruption of "Trikalinga". A.C. Burnell generally agreed with Cunningham, and interpreted the "Modogalingae" mentioned by Pliny as "Modogalingam", deriving the term from the Telugu word "Mudu" (three) and "Kalinga". However, Pliny does not make any connection between these three terms with similar spellings. He mentions Calingae as the tribes nearest to the sea, and then mentions the Mandei people (who can be identified as the people of the Mahendra mountain). He mentions "Macco-Calingae" (or "Maco-Calingae") as one of tribes of hill-dwelling Brachmanae people, and does not connect them the Calingae in any way. Similarly, according to Pliny, the country of Gangarides and the city of Calingae were two different entities: the later writers John Bostock and H.T. Riley combined the two into a single people called "Gangarides Calingae". Further, Pliny describes "Modogalingae" as a single tribe living on "a very large island in the Gangas", not as three tribes living in or around the Kalinga region. A.M. Shastri notes that "Telangana" is more likely a derivative of "Trilinga", which is distinct from "Trikalinga" as suggested by epigraphic and literary evidence.
