= Bhoja II (Pratihara dynasty) =

Pratiharan emperor from 910 to 913

8th Pratihara Emperor
- Reign: c. 910 – c. 913
- Predecessor: Mahendrapala I
- Successor: Mahipala I
- Father: Mahendrapala I
- Mother: Dehanaga-Devi

Bhoja II (910–913), according to the Asiatic Society's Plate of Vinakapala, acceded to the throne of the Pratihara empire after his father Mahendrapala I. His mother was queen Dehanaga-Devi. He reigned for a short time and was overthrown by his half-brother Mahipala I.

Preceded by Mahendrapala I (890–910)	Pratihara Emperor; 910–913 CE	Succeeded by Mahipala I (913–944)
