= Mahendrapala II =

Pratiharan emperor from 944 to 948

10th Pratihara Emperor
- Reign: c. 944 – c. 948
- Predecessor: Mahipala I
- Successor: Devapala
- Father: Mahipala
- Mother: Prasadhana-Devi

Mahendrapala II (944–948) ascended the throne of the Pratihara Empire after his father Mahipala I. His mother was queen Prasadhana Devi. He reigned for short duration but the inscription found at Mandasor indicates that the Pratihara Empire extended up to Mandasor during his reign.

Preceded by Mahipala I (913–944)	Pratihara Emperor; 944–948 AD	Succeeded by Devapala (948–954)
