= Chalukyas of Vemulavada =

Indian dynasty from the 7th to 10th centuries

- 7th century–10th century
- Capital: Vemulavada
- Official languages: Kannada; Telugu; Sanskrit
- Religion: Jainism; Hinduism
- Government: Monarchy
- History
  - Established: 7th century
  - Disestablished: 10th century
Preceded by	Succeeded by
Rashtrakutas	Chalukyas of Kalyani
- Today part of: Karnataka, Telangana and Maharashtra

Find spots of inscriptions issued during the Vemulavada Chalukya rule

The Chalukyas of Vemulavada were an Indian dynasty that ruled in and around the present-day Telangana between 7th and 10th centuries. Their capital was located at Vemulavada, and they were vassals of the Rashtrakutas.

== History ==
The 966 CE Parabhani copper-plate inscription of king Arikesari III of Vemulavada claims that his dynasty descended from the Chalukyas of solar dynasty. Not much is known about the early rulers of the dynasty. The Kollapur copper-plate inscription attributes several military victories to Vinayaditya alias Yuddhamalla I (not to be confused with the Badami Chalukya king Vinayaditya, also titled Yuddhamalla). These victories amount to the subjugation of almost the entire Indian subcontinent, and therefore, appear to be gross exaggerations. It is possible that Vinayaditya was a feudatory of a powerful king, and participated in this king's military campaigns. This king could have been the Rashtrakuta ruler Dantidurga, who was a contemporary of Vinayaditya.

The dynasty's original capital was at Podana (modern Bodhan), but was later moved to Vemulavada, probably during the reign of Vinayaditya's successor Arikesari I. According to the dynasty's inscription, Arikesari conquered Vengi and Trikalinga; this probably refers to his subjugation of the Vengi Chalukya king Vishnuvardhana IV on the orders of his Rashtrakuta overlord Dhruva Dharavarsha.

Little is known about the next two rulers, Arikesari's son Narasimha I and grandson Yuddhamalla II. Baddega I, the son of Yuddhamalla II, was a distinguished general, and assumed the title Solada-ganda ("the unvanquished hero"). He defeated the Vengi Chalukya king Bhima I. According to the Vemulavada court poets, Baddega's grandson Narasimha II subjugated the Latas, the seven Malavas, and the Gurjara-Pratihara king Mahipala. He achieved these victories in the service of his Rashtrakuta overlord Indra III, in a campaign against the Gurjara-Pratiharas.

Arikesari II, the son of Narasimha II, married two Rashtrakuta princesses, including Lokambika and Revakanirmadi (the daughter of Indra III). His mother Jakavve was probably a sister of Indra III. Several military successes are attributed to him. The noted Kannada poet Pampa was a court poet of Arikesari II. His Vikramarjuna Vijaya is an important source of the dynasty's history.

Arikesari had two sons: Vagaraja and Bhadradeva (alias Baddega-Narasinga; son of Lokambika), who were half-brothers. Vagaraja (r. c. 941–950) and Bhadradeva (r. c. 941–946) appear to have ruled simultaneously for a few years. Vagaraja, who is known to have been ruling in 959 CE, was a feudatory of the Rashtrakuta king Krishna III. He accompanied Krishna III in a military campaign to Melpadi in present-day Chittoor district, and nothing else is known about his reign. Vagaraja probably died without an heir, and was succeeded by Bhadradeva's son Arikesari III, who is attested by the 966 CE Parbhani inscription.

The subsequent history of the dynasty is unknown. It appears to have been overthrown by the Chalukyas of Kalyani by the early 970s CE.

== Cultural activities ==
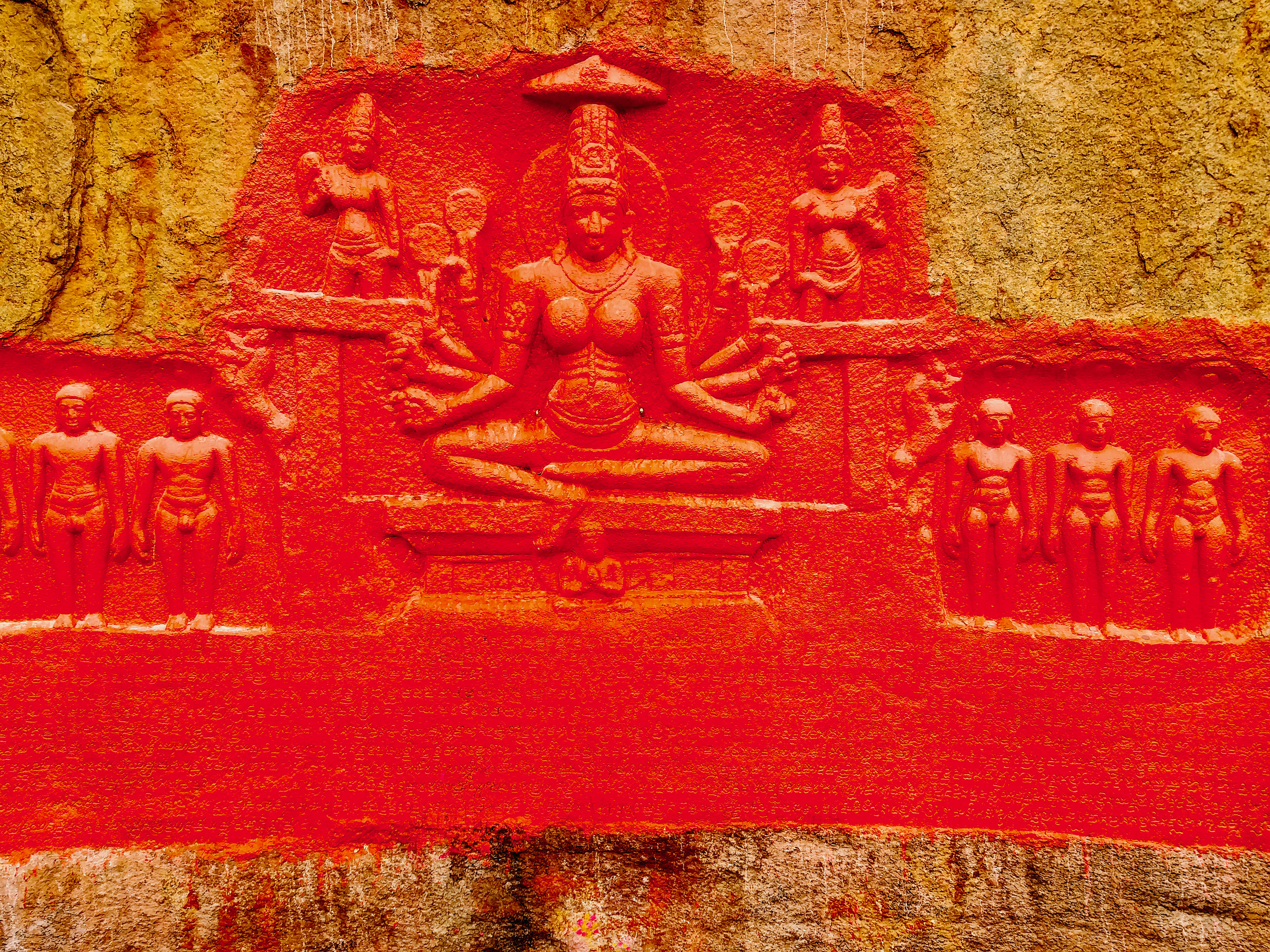
Relief of Jain Goddess Chakreshvari at Bommalagutta

Baddega I commissioned the Baddegesvara temple at Vemulavada, which is identified with the modern Bheemesvara temple. During the reign of Arikesari II, his father Narasimha's officer tantrapala Peddanarya established a temple of the Sun god. His 10th-century inscription alludes to two other temples - Rajesvvara (possibly modern Kedaresvara temple) and Nagaresvara - which may have been commissioned by the Chalukyas of Vemulavada.

Although the Chalukyas of Vemulavada patronized Shaivism, they also favoured Jainism. Arikesari's Jain court poet Adikavi Pampa composed the Kannada classic Vikramarjuna Vijaya. Pampa's brother Jina-vallabha established a Jain shrine called Tri-bhuvana-tilaka-Jinalaya on the Bommalagutta hillock near Kurikyala village in modern Karimnagar district. Jina-vallabha's wife Bhagiyabbe installed a metal Chatur-vimshati-patta image of Jina, and also established a Basadi (Jain shrine) named after her.

Baddega II commissioned at Jain temple at Repaka, and endowed it with land grants. He also commissioned the Shubha-dhama Jinalaya for his Jain Preceptor and Court poet Somadeva Suri, who migrated from the Pratihara kingdom to the Chalukya kingdom during his reign. He also granted a village to Somadeva for the maintenance of this shrine. In the year 959, Somadeva composed Yashodhara-charita (or Yashas-tilaka-champu) at Gangadhara in the Chalukya kingdom.

== Rulers ==
Following is a list of the Vemulavada Chalukya rulers, with estimated periods of their reign:

- Satyashraya (c. 650-675 CE)
- Prithvipathi (c. 675-700 CE)
- Maharaja (c. 700-725 CE)
- Rajaditya (c. 725-750 CE)
- Vinayaditya alias Yuddhamalla I (c. 750-755 CE)
- Arikesari I (c. 775-800 CE)
- Narasimha I (c. 800-825 CE)
- Yuddhamalla II (c. 825-850 CE)
- Baddega I alias Solada-ganda (c. 850-895 CE)
- Yuddhamalla III (c. 895-915 CE)
- Narasimha II (c. 915-930 CE)
- Arikesari II (c. 930-941 CE)
- Vagaraja (c. 941-950 CE); Bhadradeva or Baddega-Narasinga alias Baddega II (c. 941-946 CE)
- Arikesari III (c. 946-968 CE)

== Inscriptions ==
The following inscriptions of the dynasty have been discovered:

Find spot	Date	Issuer	Language	Source
Kuravagatta, Mahboobnagar district	c. 9th century	Viragriha, son of Vinayaditya	Sanskrit and Kannada	
Kollipara	c. 9th century	Arikesari I	Sanskrit	
Vemulavada	Undated	Arikesari II	Sanskrit	
Kurikyala	Undated	Arikesari II	Sanskrit, Kannada and Telugu	
Karimnagar	946 CE	Arikesari III	Sanskrit and Kannada	
Parbhani	966 CE	Arikesari III	Sanskrit	
Repaka, Karimnagar district	968 CE	Arikesari III	Sanskrit and Kannada	
