= Mahipala I =

Pratihara emperor from 913 to 944

- Maharajadhiraja; Uttarapatha Swami; King of Kings of Aryavarta

Maharajadhiraja of Kannauj
- Reign: c. 913 – c. 944
- Predecessor: Bhoja II
- Successor: Mahendrapala II
- Father: Mahendrapala I
- Mother: Mahidevi
- Religion: Shaivism

Mahipala I (r. 913–944) was the Pratihara emperor from 913 to 944. He ascended the throne of the Gurjara-Pratihara Empire after his half brother Bhoja II. He was a son of Queen Mahidevi. Mahipala I was also known by the names: Ksitipala, Vinayakapala, Herambapala and Uttarapatha Swami.

== Reign ==
It seems that Indra III's campaign did not influence Kannauj much and Mahipala I soon revived Kannauj as court poet Rajasekhara calls him Maharajadhiraja of Aryavarta. According to Kavyamimansa of Rajasekhara, Mahipala's reign extended from the upper course of the river Bias in the north-west to Kalinga or Orissa in the south-east, and from the Himalayas to the Kerala or Chera country in the far south.

That Mahipala reigned over territories up to the Narbada river is evident from the Partabgarh inscription, which provides information about his son Mahendrapala II ruling at Ujjain in 946. R. S. Tripathi asserts that as Mahendrapala II is not credited with any achievements so Mahipala I must be the king who recovered Ujjain.

The closing days of Mahipala's reign were disturbed by attacks by the Rashtrakutas on northern India as the Deoli and Karhad plates of Krishna III, while praising his achievement in the style of an inflated panegyric, inform that by hearing conquest of southern regions, the hope about Kalanjara and Citrakuta vanished from the heart of the Gurjara.

Arab chronicler Al-Masudi describes Mahipala I as follows:

"The ruler has four armies according to the four quarters of the wind. Each of these number 700,000 or 900,000 men. He has large armies in the garrisons in the north and in the south; in the east and in the west, for he is surrounded on all sides by warlike rulers."

Mahipala I, whom Kannada poet Pampa expressly calls "Gurjararaja", carried forward the work of his ancestors.

Dharanivaraha, a Chapa or Chavda ruler ruling at Vardhamana (now Wadhwan in Surashtra region of Gujarat) was a feudatory of Mahipala, which is mentioned in his grant dated 914.

Preceded by Bhoja II	Pratihara Emperor; 913–944	Succeeded by Mahendrapala II
