= Arikesari III =

Vemulavada Chalukya ruler

Arikesari III (r. c. 946–968) was the last known ruler of the Vemulavada Chalukya dynasty of present-day Telangana, India. He was a vassal of the Rashtrakuta king Krishna III.

== Early life ==
Arikesari III was a grandson of the Chalukya king Arikesari II. His father Bhadradeva and his uncle Vagaraja (who succeeded Arikesari II) were half-brothers. Bhadradeva (r. c. 941-946) probably ruled jointly with Vagaraja (r. c. 941-950), and Arikesari III (r. c. 946-968) ascended the throne after them. Bhadradeva probably died before Vagaraja, and Vagaraja probably died without an heir, which may explain why Arikesari III succeeded Vagaraja.

== Reign ==
Like his predecessor, Arikesari III was a feudatory of the Rashtrakuta king Krishna III. His 946 CE Karimnagar inscription records a land grant to a brahmana. His 966 CE Parbhani copper-plate inscription records the grant of a village to the Jain leader and his Preceptor Somadeva-suri for the maintenance of Shubha-dharma Jinalaya shrine, which had been built by his father Bhadradeva. The granted village was Kuttumvritti-Vanikadupulu, which was located in the Repaka-12 subdivision of the Sabbi-1000 administrative division. His 968 CE Repaka inscription records a land grant to a Jain shrine (Jinalaya) by the chief Vujaya; the temple is said to have been built by Arikesari.

Arikesari III bore several titles inherited from his grandfather, including Pambarankusham, Ammana-gandha-varanam, Gandhebha-Vidyadharam, Arudha-Sarvajnan, Udatta-narayanan, Nodutti-gevlom, Guna-nidhi, Gunarnava, Sharanagata-vajra-panjara, Priyagalla, Tribhuvana-malla, and Samanta-chudamani.

It is not certain how and when the reign of Arikesari III ended. By the year 966-967, the Kalyani Chalukyas had made inroads into the territory of the Vemulavada kings, as attested by an inscription discovered at Uppili in the Maktal taluka of the Mahboobnagar district. Another 973-974 inscription of Permumadi, an officer (ankakara) of the Kalyani Chalukya king Taila II, has been discovered at Koraprolu in the present-day Nalgonda district. This suggests that the Kalyani Chalukyas conquered the Vemulavada territories during 966-973.
