= Champu =

Genre of Indian literature

Champu or campū-kāvya (Devanagari: चम्पूकाव्य) is a genre of literary composition in South Asian literature. The word campū is described by Daṇḍin (8th century CE) as combination of poetry and prose (gadyapadyamayī) in his Kāvyādarśa (1.31), an important work on poetics in the history of South Asian literature. This form was especially popular in South India, and was the preferred genre of many court poets writing in Sanskrit, Kannada, Telugu, and other languages.

== Works in Champu style ==
=== Sanskrit ===
The earliest known campū is generally regarded to be Trivikramabhaṭṭa's Damayantīkathā ("the Story of Damayantī") or Nalacampū ("the Campū of Nala"), dated to the 10th century CE. Another early example include the Yaśastilakacampū of Somadeva Sūri (also 10th century CE). This genre remained popular well into the early modern period, evidenced by works such as the Nīlakaṇṭhavijayacampū ("the Victory of Nīlakaṇṭha") of Nīlakaṇṭha Dīkṣita (17th century CE).

=== Kannada ===
Pampa (10th century CE), one of the earliest Kannada poets and considered one of Kannada's "triple gems" (ratnatraya), composed his most famous works in the campū style: Vikramārjunavijaya (also known as the Pampa Bhārata) and Ādipurana. The campū remained an extremely popular genre in Kannada for centuries, composed on a variety of themes ranging from classical mythology to the lives of saints. Later campūs include Cauṇḍarasa's Abhinavadaśakumāracarite (14th century CE) and Ṣaḍakṣaradēva's Śabaraśaṅkaravilāsa (17th century CE). Due to the courtly provenance of this style, most campūs are written in a highly ornate, classical language, typically known as Old Kannada.

=== Telugu ===
Telugu poets have used the champu way of rendering poetry. Krishnamaacharya carried this tradition of Champu Marga step further by putting his writings mainly in devotional prose called Vachana.

In Telugu literature, the most acclaimed Champu work is Nannaya Bhattarakudu's Andhra Mahabharatam, produced around the 11th century, which is rendered in the Champu style, is so chaste and polished and of such a high literary merit.

=== Odia ===
Odia literature is also replete with the champu style poetry. Kabisurjya Baladeba Ratha, Banamali Dasa, Dinakrushna Das are some of the most famous poets who wrote Champu.

In Odia literature too, there are numerous works in this genre. There is an added feature though- a Champu in Odia usually has 34 songs, one for each consonant of the alphabet. This rule, though absent in Sanskrit definitions is followed in most of the creations of the Champu genre in Odia. All lines of a song start with its assigned letter. The most famous work is 18th century poet Kabisurjya Baladeba Ratha's Kisorachandrananda Champu, often shortened to simply Kisori Champu. It narrates the tale of Radha and Krishna's romance in 34 Odissi songs set to different ragas & talas. The Champu is one of the most important works of Odissi music.
