= Vikramarjuna Vijaya =

Kannada-language Indian classic

Vikramarjuna Vijaya (Kannada- ವಿಕ್ರಮಾರ್ಜುನ ವಿಜಯ) (Victory of the Mighty Arjuna), also known as Pampa Bharatha , is a classic work of the 10th century Jain poet Pampa (902–975 AD). It is a Jain version of the great epic, the Mahabharata written in Kannada Pampa chose Arjuna, the central figure of the Pandava Clan, as the protagonist of his epic. This work differs from Mahabharata in several aspects, one of them being Arjuna crowned as king and Subhadra as queen after the Kurukshetra war, instead of Yudhishthira and Draupadi, respectively.

A court poet of Chalukya king Arikesari II, a Rashtrakuta feudatory, he is most known for his epics, Vikramarjuna Vijaya (Pampa Bharata) and Adipurana, both written in Champu style, which he created and which served as the model for all future works in Kannada. The works of Jain writers Adikavi Pampa, Sri Ponna and Ranna, collectively called the "three gems of Kannada literature," heralded the age of classical Kannada in the 10th century, the Medieval Kannada literature.

== History ==
Vikramarjuna Vijaya is a 1000 th-century work of Adikavi Pampa.

== Content ==
This work is not an abridged version of Vyasa's Mahabharata, but, rather, a recreation of the original in the cultural context of Karnataka and the religious context of Jainism. The relatively less dominant and slightly Machiavellian role given to Krishna is a major change.

Pampa was the court poet of Chalukya King Arikesari, a Rashtrakuta feudatory. The work acquires a historical significance because of the equation made by the poet between Arjuna and Arikesari his patron king belonging to the Ganga dynasty. This work was trendsetting in Kannada in terms of both subject and form.

== See also ==
- Western Chalukya literature in Kannada
- Adi Purana
- original Text- Pamp Bharat- with word by word meaning : ಪಂಪಭಾರತ

== Sources ==
- Singh, Upinder (2016), A History of Ancient and Early Medieval India: From the Stone Age to the 12th Century, Pearson Education, ISBN 978-93-325-6996-6
