= Baddega I =

Baddega (r. c. 850–895 CE), who assumed the title Solada-gaṇḍa, was an Indian ruler from the Vemulavada Chalukya dynasty. He was a vassal of the Rashtrakuta Emperor Krishna II, and participated in Krishna's unsuccessful invasions of the Vengi Chalukya kingdom.

== Reign ==
Baddega was a son of his predecessor Yuddhamalla II, and served as a vassal of the Rashtrakuta Emperor Krishna II. He is said to have fought 42 battles, and acquired the title Solada-gaṇḍa ("the unvanquished hero").

The Vemulavada Chalukyas were old rivals of the Vengi Chalukyas, and had participated in Rashtrakuta campaigns against them. The Vengi Chalukya ruler Gunaga Vijayaditya III inflicted a humiliating defeat on Krishna. According to the Vengi Chalukya inscriptions, Vijayaditya captured Baddega, and offered him protection.

After Vijayaditya's death in 892, the succession of the next king Bhima I was contested by some rebels. Taking advantage of this, Krishna invaded Vengi once again, and captured the frontier region administered by the Ranamardadaka family. However, he was forced to retreat by the Vengi general Kusuma-yudha. This is attested by the Kuravi (or Koravi) inscription of Kusuma-yudha's subordinate Peddana. Krishna appears to have launched another invasion of Vengi, as attested by Bhima's Vedataluru grant inscription. This time, the Rashtrakuta army led by Gundyana penetrated deeper into the Vengi Chalukya kingdom, before being forced to retreat.

Baddega appears to have participated in both of Krishna's campaigns against Bhima. According to his family's Parbhani inscription and the court poet Pampa, he captured Bhima as if "he seized a crocodile in water." The simile suggests that Baddega captured Bhima in his natural environment, that is, within the Vengi kingdom, possibly in the capital. Therefore, this event probably happened during the second Rashtrakuta invasion of Vengi, when the invaders penetrated deeper into the kingdom. Bhima appears to have escaped the captivity in a short time, and continued to rule Vengi. His son Iramarti Ganda defeated the Rashtrakuta forces at Peruvanguru and Niravadyapura. Both Iramarti and the Rashtrakuta general Gundyana were killed in this war.

Nothing is known about Bhima's other military achievements. He appears to have died around 895, and was succeeded by his son Yuddhamalla III.

== Cultural contributions ==
An inscription of Baddega's descendant Arisimha II mentions the Baddegeshvara ("Ishvara of Baddega") temple; the name suggests that it was built by Baddega. This temple is identified with the modern Bheemeshvara temple at Vemulavada.
