= Adikavi Pampa =

Kannada poet (902–955)

- Born: 902; Annigeri, Rashtrakuta Empire (present-day Annigeri, Dharwad, District, Karnataka, India)
- Died: 955 (aged 52–53); Bodhan, Rashtrakuta Empire (present-day Bodhan, Telangana, India)
- Occupation: Jain Poet
- Works: Ādipurāṇa; Vikramārjuna Vijaya also known as Pampa Bhārata

Pampa (902–955), also referred to by the honorific Ādikavi (Poet of Adinath purana), was a Kannada-language Jain poet whose works reflected his philosophical beliefs. He was a court poet of Vemulavada Chalukya king Arikesari II, who was a feudatory of the Rashtrakuta Emperor Krishna III. Pampa is best known for his epics Vikramārjuna Vijaya or Pampa Bharata, and the "Ādi purāṇa", both written in the champu style around c. 939. These works served as the model for all future champu works in Kannada.

The works of Jain writers Pampa celebrated as one of the “three gems” (Ratnatraya) of classical "Kannada literature" alongside Sri Ponna (poet) and Ranna (Kannada poet). heralded the 10th century era of medieval Kannada literature.

== Early life ==
Pampa was born around 902 in the Vengi region (present-day Andhra Pradesh) into a Jain family. Though sometimes mistakenly described simply as a "Brahmin," his family followed a Jain Brahmans tradition, which was also present in Jainism. also called Jain Pandits—which had its own priestly and scholarly roles devoted to Jain worship and philosophy. Also he wrote Adipurana (Adinath Purana) about the first Tirthankara of Jainism. their actual place of origin and native is debated. According to the trilingual inscription (in Sanskrit, Kannada and Telugu) installed by Pampa's younger brother Jinavallabha at Bommalamma Gutta in Kurikiyala village, Gangadharam mandal (in modern-day Telangana), his father was Abhimanadevaraya (also known as Bhimappayya) and mother was Abbanabbe. It also indicated that his grandfather was Abhimanachandra who belonged to the Jain Brahmin (Jain Pandits) and hailed from Vangiparru in Kammanadu in present-day Guntur district, Andhra Pradesh.

In the eastern Deccan ruled by Chalukyas of Vengi and Vemulavada was considered as Kannada speaking territory under the rule of Chalukyas and Rashtrakutas, renowned Kannada poets like Pampa and Ponna hailed from Vengi. Kannada dynasties like Chalukyas and Rashtrakutas had dominated the whole of Deccan and the influence of the Kannada language was felt from the Kaveri and Godavari and even beyond. Hence there were many Kannada families residing in modern Telangana and Andhra Pradesh and Pampa was one of them. According to the modern Jain scholar Hampa Nagarajaiah ("Hampana"), Pampa was born in Annigeri, spent his early childhood on the banks of the nearby Varada river and his mother Abbanabbe was the granddaughter of Joyisa Singha of Annigeri in the modern Dharwad district of Karnataka state. Frequent descriptions of the beauty of the Banavasi region (in the modern Uttara Kannada district) and even the sprinkling (abhisheka) of water from the Varada river on Arjuna's head during his coronation in Pampa's epic Vikramarjuna Vijaya testifies to the poet's attachment to the Banavasi region. Through the lines aarankusamittodam nenevudenna manam banvaasi deshamam and puttidirdode maridumbiyaagi men kogileyaagi nandanavanadol banavaasi deshadol he has expressed his deep attachment towards Banavasi.

Kannada poets and writers in the Rashtrakuta Empire (753–973 CE)
Amoghavarsha	850
Sri vijaya	850
Asaga	850
Shivakotiacharya	900
Ravinagabhatta	930
Pushpadanta	939
Adikavi Pampa	941
Jainachandra	950
Sri Ponna	950
Kavi Rajaraja	9th-10th c.
Gajanakusha	10th century
Earlier Kannada poets and writers praised in Kavirajamarga
Durvinita	6th century
Vimalachandra	Pre-850
Nagarjuna	Pre-850
Jayabodhi	Pre-850
Udaya	Pre-850
Kavisvara	Pre-850
Pandita Chandra	Pre-850
Lokapala	Pre-850

== Poetic life ==
A well-travelled man, he settled down as the court poet of King Arikesari II. Flattered by his knowledge and poetic abilities, Arikesari (who possessed the title Gunarnava) conferred on him the title Kavita Gunarnava. At the age of 39 he wrote his first masterpiece, Ādi purāṇa, in 941, and a little later he completed Vikramarjuna Vijaya popularly known as Pampa Bharata. These two works have remained unparalleled works of classic Kannada composition.

== Adipurana ==
The Ādi purāṇa, written in the champu style, a mixed form of prose and verse, is a Kannada version of the Sanskrit work by Jinasena and details in sixteen cantos the life of the first Tirthankara of Jainism, Rishabhanath. The work focuses in his own unique style the pilgrimage of a soul to perfection and attainment of moksha. In the work, Pampa describes the struggle for power and control over the entire world of two brothers Bharata and Bahubali, sons of Rishabha. While Bahubali wins, he renounces the worldly pursuits in favor of his brother. Many Jain puranas of Middle Ages found a role model in this work.

== Sources ==
- Kamat, Suryanath U (2002) [1980]. A Concise history of Karnataka from pre-historic times to the present. Bangalore: Jupiter Books. ISBN 81-206-09778.
- Sastri, K.A. Nilakanta (1999). A history of south India : from prehistoric times to the fall of Vijayanagar (4. ed., 17 impr. (with introduction). ed.). Oxford [u.a.]: Oxford Univ. Press. ISBN 0-19-560686-8.
- Singh, Upinder (2016), A History of Ancient and Early Medieval India: From the Stone Age to the 12th Century, Pearson Education, ISBN 978-93-325-6996-6
