= Krishna I =

Rashtrakuta emperor from 756 to 774

- Akalavarsha; Shubatunga; Prithvivallabha; Shrivallabha
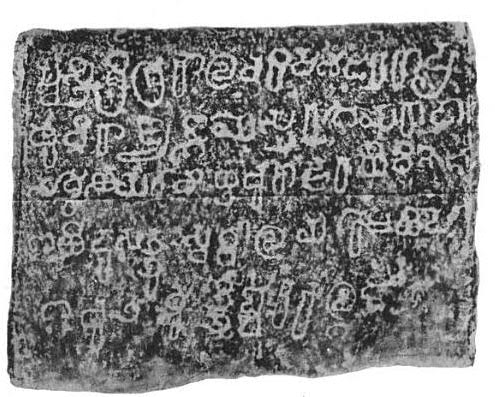
- Fragment of Old Kannada inscription (765 CE) from Hattimattur of Rashtrakuta emperor Krishna I

2nd Rashtrakuta emperor
- Reign: c. 756 – c. 774
- Predecessor: Dantidurga
- Successor: Govinda II
- Born: c. 711
- Died: 774 (aged 62–63); Manyakheta, Rashtrakuta Empire (modern day Karnataka, India)
- Issue: Govinda II; Dhruva Dharavarsha
- Religion: Jainism Hinduism

Krishna I (Kannada: ಅಕಾಲವರ್ಷ ಶುಭತುಂಗ ಕೃಷ್ಣ; 711–774) was the Rashtrakuta emperor from 756 to 774.

== Life ==
He was an uncle of Dantidurga. He took charge of the growing Rashtrakuta Empire by defeating the last Badami Chalukya emperor Kirtivarman II in 757. This is known from the copper plate grant of Emperor Govinda III of 807 and a copper plate grant of Gujarat Rashtrakuta ruler Karka from Baroda.

He is known as Kanhardeva or Kanhesvara and took the titles Akalavarsha, Shubatunga, Prithvivallabha and Shrivallabha.

He patronised the famous Jain logician Akalanka Bhatta, the author of Rajavartika.

Some historians claim that Krishna I usurped the throne from Dantidurga. Since the term "demise of Dantidurga" occurs in Kavi and Navasari copper plates indicating that Krishna I ascended the throne after Dantidurga's death. However, from the Baroda inscription it seems that Krishna I may have had to subdue another claimant to the throne, perhaps a Rashtrakuta prince or a son of Dantidurga.

He defeated the Western Ganga Dynasty King Sripurusha (and acquired territory in Gangavadi, modern Southern Karnataka) and the Shilaharas of South Konkan. He defeated the Eastern Chalukya ruler Vishnuvardhana IV. He commissioned 18 Shiva temples. The Kailasa or Kannadeswara temple at Ellora is generally attributed to him, based on epigraphs.

His eldest son, Govinda II succeeded him.

== Religion ==
The Nerur copper-plate inscription issued by Krishna I records a royal grant of land to Acharya Aryanadi, a Jain. The inscription opens with a description of the king’s genealogy and then notes the donation of a village for the maintenance of a Jain shrine or monk. This inscription is early epigraphic evidence for Rashtrakuta patronage of Jainism during Krishna I.

He is remembered in Jain tradition as a patron of Jain logician and philosopher Akalanka, who composed the Rajavartika, a major commentary on the Tattvartha Sutra. Epigraphic evidence from his reign shows sustained royal patronage of Jain monks, temples, and scholars across the Deccan.

Rashtrakuta rulers, despite strong Jain leanings, supported multiple religions including significant support for Hinduism.> He is known for commissioning the monumental Kailasa or Kannadeswara temple, Ellora, dedicated to Shiva.

| Preceded by Dantidurga | Rashtrakuta Emperor; 756–774 | Succeeded by Govinda II |
