= Origin of the Rashtrakuta dynasty =

Early history of Indian dynasty

The Origin of the Rashtrakuta dynasty has been a controversial topic and has been debated over the past decades by historians. The differing opinions mostly revolve around issues such as the home of the earliest ancestors of the medieval Rashtrakutas, a possible southern migration during the early part of the first millennium and the relationship between the several Rashtrakuta dynasties that ruled small kingdoms in northern and central India and the Deccan in the 6th century - 7th century. Further, the relationship of these medieval Rashtrakutas to the most important and famous dynasty, the Rashtrakutas of Manyakheta of the 8th century - 10th century time period has also been debated.

While the history of the early Rashtrakutas has caused much debate, the history of the Rashtrakutas of Manyakheta (in present-day Gulbarga) of the 8th–10th centuries can be accurately constructed because numerous contemporaneous inscriptions and texts refer to them. The crux of the Manyakheta empire extended from the Kaveri river in the south to the Narmada in the north. At their peak they were the only south Indian empire that conquered regions in far northern India (Kannauj) as well as the extreme south (Tamilakam). The Lata branch of the empire (in present-day Gujarat) was an important dynasty belonging to the Manyakheta family line which later merged with the Manyakheta kingdom during the 9th century.

== Research ==
=== Sources ===
The study of the history of the early Rashtrakutas and the Rashtrakutas of Manyakheta has been made possible by the availability of numerous inscriptions spread all over the Deccan, ancient literature in Pali, contemporaneous Kannada literature such as Kavirajamarga (850) and Vikramarjuna Vijaya (941), Sanskrit writings by Somadeva, Rajashekara, Gunabhadra, Jinasena and others and the notes of Arab travellers of those times such as Suleiman, Ibn Haukal, Al Masudi, Al Istakhri and others. Scholars have left no topic unstudied in an effort to accurately propose the history of the Rashtrakutas. Theories about their lineage (Surya Vamsa or Chandra Vamsa), native region and ancestral home have been proposed using clues from inscriptions, royal emblems, ancient clan names such as "Rashtrika", epithets such as Ratta, Rashtrakuta, Lattalura Puravaradhiswara, names of royalty, coins and contemporaneous literature.

=== Epithets ===
The appearance of the terms Rathika, Ristika (Rashtrika) or Lathika in conjunction with the terms Kambhoja and Gandhara in some Ashokan inscriptions of the 2nd century BCE from Mansera and Shahbazgarhi in North Western Frontier Province (present day Pakistan), Girnar (Saurashtra) and Dhavali (Kalinga) and the use of the epithet "Ratta" in many later inscriptions had prompted a claim by Reu that the earliest Rashtrakutas were descendants of the Arattas, natives of the Punjab region mentioned in the text of Mahabharata who later migrated south and set up kingdoms there, while another theory of J.H. Fleet points more generally to north western regions of India. Based on this theory, the Arattas may have become natives of the Deccan having arrived there during the early centuries of the first millennium.

This is counter to the argument by other scholars that the term Rishtika used together with Petenika in the Ashokan inscriptions implied they were hereditary ruling clans from modern Maharashtra region and the term "Ratta" implied Maharatta ruling families from modern Maharashtra region. But this has been rejected on the basis that from ancient books such as Dipavamsha and Mahavamsha in Pali language it is known the term Maharatta and not Rashtrika has been used to signify inhabitants from modern Maharashtra region and the terms Rashtrika and Petenika appear to be two different displaced ruling tribes. Some scholars argue that the attempt to link the Rashtakutas to Mahrattas or Marathis was driven by a need to project modern political identities onto a much more complex past as these groups wouldn't exist till many centuries later.

It is noted by another scholar that ruling clans called Rathis and Maharathis were in power in parts of present-day Karnataka as well in the early centuries of the Christian era, which is known inscriptions from the region and further proven by the discovery of lead coins from the middle of 3rd century bearing Sadakana Kalalaya Maharathi in the heart of modern Karnataka region near Chitradurga. In the face of these facts it is claimed it can no longer be maintained that the Rathi and Maharathi families were confined only to present day Maharashtra. It is claimed there is sufficient inscriptional evidence that several Maharathi families were related to Kannadiga families by marriage and they were naga worshippers, a form of worship very popular in the Mysore region (modern Karnataka). The terms Rathi, Maharathi, Rathika, Rashtriya, Rasthrapathi and Rasthtrakuta were of political and administrative significance and not used to denote any tribes or ethnicity. Also, no evidence to confirm that these families were either Aryan or non-Aryan is available. C. V. Vaidya claimed that Rashtrakutas were ancestors of modern Marathas. This was rejected by historian A. S. Altekar who showed that they were of the 'Canarese' stock and that their mother tongue was Kannada. According to E. P. Rice the northern limits of the Kannada spoken region was pushed back by Maratha raids and conquests in more modern times.

The epithet Ratta, it is also claimed is a Kannada word from which the word Rashtrakuta has been derived. The use of the word Rattagudlu (meaning an office) has been found in inscriptions from present day Andhra Pradesh dated prior to the 8th century indicating it was a South Indian word. From the Deoli plates and Karhad records it is argued there was a prince called Ratta and his son was called Rashtrakuta. Hence it has been argued the Rashtrakutas were of Kannada origin. It is also said the term Rashtrakuta means "state headman" where Rashtra means province and Kuta means chieftain or Rashtra means "kingdom" and Kuta means "lofty".

Another epithet used in inscriptions of Amoghavarsha I was Lattalura Puravaradhiswara. It is proposed that it refers to their original home Lattalur, modern day Latur in Maharashtra state, bordering Karnataka. This area it is claimed was predominantly Kannada speaking based on surviving vestiges of place names, inscriptions and cultural relics. It is explained that Latta is a Prakrit variation of Ratta and hence Rattana-ur became Lattana-ur and finally Lattalur. An alternative theory is that Latalurapura is modern day Ratnapur in Bilaspur district of central India. However it is most likely that they were Kannada military aristocrats settled in Maharashtra by their overlords for administrative purpose.

=== Royal names and signatures ===
In linking possible connections between the medieval Rashtrakuta families to the imperial family of Manyakheta it has been pointed out that only the family members ruling from Elichpur (Berar or modern Amravati district, modern Maharashtra) had names that were very similar to the names of Kings of the Manyakheta dynasty. From the Tivarkhed and Multhai inscriptions it is clear that the kings of this family were Durgaraja, Govindaraja, Svamikaraja and Nannaraja. These names closely resemble the names of Manyakheta kings or their extended family, the name Govindaraja appearing multiple times among the Manyakheta line. These names also appear in the Gujarat line of Rashtrakutas whose family ties with the Manyakheta family is well known.

It has been noted that princes and princesses of the Rashtrakuta family used pure Kannada names such as Kambarasa, Asagavve, Revakka and Abbalabbe as their personal names indicating that they were native Kannadigas. It has been pointed out that princesses of family lineage belonging to Gujarat signed their royal edicts in Kannada even in their Sanskrit inscriptions. Some examples of this are the Navsari and Baroda plates of Karka I and the Baroda plates of his son Dhruva II. It has been attested by a scholar that the Gujarat Rashtrakuta princes signed their inscriptions in the language of their native home and the race they belonged to. It is well known that the Gujarat line of Rashtrakutas were from the same family as the Manyakheta line. It is argued that if the Rashtrakutas were originally a Marathi speaking family, then the Gujarat Rashtrakutas would not have signed their inscriptions in Kannada language and that too in far away Gujarat. The theory that under the rule of the Badami Chalukyas of Kannada country, Kannada speaking dynasties were established in the far corners of the Chalukya empire (the vassal Chalukyas of Navasarika) in Gujarat, Andhra and Berar (present day Vidharba region in modern Maharashtra) and hence the ancestors of King Dantidurga, the founder of the Manyakheta empire were Kannadigas. It is further claimed there is proof that in the locality where Dantidurga lived Kannada was the spoken language.

=== Emblems ===
Several Rashtrakuta families ruled India during the 6th century - 7th century period. Scholars have tried to understand their relationship with the Rashtrakutas of Manyakheta by a comparative study of the emblems.

The only Rashtrakuta family whose royal emblem is similar to that of the rulers of Manyakheta, the golden eagle or Garuda lanchhana (emblem) is that of the family that ruled from Amravathi district of modern Maharashtra. It has been theorised that this line may possibly have been ancestors of the Manyakheta kings. Their inscriptions (Tivarkhed and Multhai) were issued from Achalapura (modern Elichpur) which may have been their capital. Another Rashtrakuta family ruling from Manapura with its founder King Abhimanyu had the emblem of a lion. This makes it improbable that they were the ancestors of the Manyakheta family. The location of Manapura is uncertain. John Faithfull Fleet proposed its identification with Manpur in Malwa, and then with Manpur near Bandhavgarh, but later rejected both these theories himself. Bhagawanlal Indraji identified it with Manyakheta (Malkhed) itself. Vasudev Vishnu Mirashi identified it with Man, Satara.

=== Vamsha (genealogy) ===
With regards to their vamsha (whether they belonged to Surya Vamsha (solar lineage) or Chandra Vamsha (lunar lineage), Rashtrakuta inscriptions remained silent on the issue, until about 860. Scholars have traced the lineage claims of Rashtrakutas from Satyaki branch of Yadu Vamsa. Over 75 inscriptions have been found thereafter in the Deccan and Gujarat which speak about their vamsha. Of these, 8 lay a direct claim that they belonged to the Yadava line descended from the Vrishni hero Satyaki. Rashtrakutas claim Vrishni Yadava lineage throughout their records. One inscription of 860 clearly states that King Dantidurga was born to the Yadava Satyaki, 1800 coins of King Krishna I (772). An inscription of King Govinda III (808) mentions "by the birth of this virtuous king, the Rashtrakuta dynasty became invincible just as the Yadava dynasty by the birth of Lord Krishna".

=== Language ===
While the linguistic leanings of the early Rashtrakutas (pre-8th century) has caused considerable debate, the history and language of the imperial Rashtrakutas of Manyakheta has been free of such confusion. It is clear from inscriptions, coinage and prolific contemporaneous literature that the court of these Rashtrakutas was multi-lingual, and used Sanskrit and Kannada as their administrative languages and encouraged literature in Sanskrit and Kannada. Rashtrakuta inscriptions outside Karnataka are mostly in Sanskrit However this period was the very end of the classical era of literary Sanskrit and Prakrit. As such, from the Kavirajamarga of the 9th century, it is known that Kannada was popular from Kaveri river up to the Godavari river, an area covering large territory in modern Maharashtra.

The Rashtrakuta inscriptions call them the vanquishers of the Karnatabala, a sobriquet used to refer to the near invincibility of the Chalukyas of Badami. This however it is claimed should not be construed to mean that the Rashtrakutas themselves were not Kannadigas. Their patronage and love of the Kannada language is apparent in that most of their inscriptions within modern Karnataka are in Kannada, while their inscriptions outside of modern Karnataka tended to be in Sanskrit. An inscription in classical Kannada of King Krishna III has also been found as far away as Jabalpur in modern Madhya Pradesh which further supports the view of their affinity to the language.

Adikavi Pampa, Sri Ponna, Shivakotiacharya and King Amoghavarsha I were among the noteworthy scholars in Kannada, the Apabhramsha poet Pushpadanta wrote several works and famous Sanskrit scholars such as Jinasena and Virasena (both of whom were theologians), mathematician Mahaviracharya and poets such as Trivikrama and Gunabhadra adorned their courts. The earliest extant Kannada literature belongs to this time. These Rashtrakuta kings married princess from Northern and Southern India and several Rashtrakuta branches emerged in Northern India during their imperialistic expansion in the 9th century.

The argument that the Rashtrakutas were either Marathi speaking Marathas or Telugu speaking Reddies in origin has been rejected. Reddys in that time period had not come into martial prominence even in the Telugu speaking regions of Andhra, being largely an agrarian society of cultivators who only much later (in the 14th century - 15th century) came to control regions in the Krishna - Rajamundry districts. It is also not possible to change ‘Rashtra’ into ‘Ratta’ or ‘Reddy’ in Telugu. The Rashtrakuta period did not produce any Marathi inscriptions or literature. In addition very few literary works in Prakrit language are available from this period. Hence Marathi as the language of the Rashtrakutas, it is claimed, is not an acceptable argument.
