= Kokasa =

Indian craftsman

Kokasa was a craftsman, sculptor and architect from ancient India. Several Jain texts from the 5th century onwards mention legends about him, crediting him with building flying machines. Inscriptions from the 12th century onwards mention several sculptors and artists who describe themselves as descendants of Kokasa. Marathi-language legends from the 15th century onwards suggest that he was the architect of the Kailasha Temple at Ellora.

== Overview of sources ==
Several historical literary texts and inscriptions mention Kokasa and his descendants. The earliest of these is the Jain text Vasudeva-hindi; this text is probably from the 5th century, but Dhammilla-hindi - the section that mentions Kokasa - is a later addition to the original text. The earliest surviving inscription to mention Kokasa is from 1159 CE.

Variants of Kokasa's name that appear in various sources include Kukkasa, Kukkāsa, Kokkasa, Kakkosa, and Kokkāsa. Pukvasa, mentioned in Budhasvamin's Brhat-katha-shloka-samgraha, appears to be another name for Kokasa. Different records associate Kokasa with different places, including western India (Sopara, Paithan, Ellora); central India (Ujjain, Alhaghat, Jabalpur, Jejakabhukti, Ratanpur); eastern India (Tosali and Tamralipti); and Yavana-desha beyond India.

== In Jain texts ==
Kokasa finds a mention as a master craftsman in several Jain texts, including Vasudeva-hindi, Avashyaka-churni, Avashyaka-niryukti, Dasvaikalika Churni, Visheshavashyaka Bhashya, and Harisena's Brihat-Katha-Kosha.

According to the Dhammilla-hiṇḍi section of Vasudeva-hindi, Kokasa was a native of Tamalitti (Tamralipti), and his name derived from the word kukkusa ("husk"). He went to Yavana-desha (the land of the Greeks) with a caravan of traders that included Dhana-vasu, son of Dhana-pati. There, he learned woodcraft from a local carpenter. After returning to Tamralipti, he became a reputed artist, and gained the local king's attention when he built some mechanical doves. He then made an aerial car for the king, but because of the overweight queen, the car landed in Tosali. Kokasa then built flying machines for the king of Tosali. Kokkasa kept his knowledge secret, and when his father-in-law pressed him to divulge the information, he disappeared with his wife to an unknown place.

According to Avashyaka-churni (c. 6th century CE), Kokasa was a carpenter from Surparaka (Sopara). Using his knowledge of crafts (shilpa-vidya), he made mechanical pigeons and a mechanical garuda that could fly. Unlike the Vasudeva-hindi, this text does not mention the Yavanas, and Kokasa ("Kokkasa") learns his skill in Sopara.

== In medieval Marathi literature ==
Kokasa appears as Kokas vadhai (or vāḍhiyā, "carpenter") in medieval Marathi texts such as Lila-charitra and Katha-Kalpataru. Shri-krishna-charitra, a Mahanubhava text, identifies him with the demon Margajasura who was killed by Krishna.

A legend in Katha-Kalpataru of Krishna Yajnavalki (c. 1470-1535 CE) suggests that Kokasa and his team of 7000 artisans built the Kailasha Temple at Ellora. According to this legend, the king Ela (or Yelurai) of Alajapura (modern Achalpur) suffered from a disease during night-time because of a sin that he had committed in his previous birth. His queen Manikavati prayed to god Ghrishneshwar at Elapura (Ellora) to cure her husband, promising to build a temple dedicated to Shiva, and vowing to observe a fast until she could see the shikhara (top) of the temple. The king was cured after he bathed at a tank at Mahisamala (modern Mhaismal) during a hunting expedition. To fulfill the queen's promise, the king summoned many artists, who declared that it would take at least 16 months to build a temple complete with a shikhara. Kokasa, a famous shilpi who lived in Pratishthana (modern Paithan), assured the king that the queen would be able to see the shikhara in a week's time. He began to carve out the shikhara of the rock temple from the top. The temple was named Manikeshwar after the queen, and a new settlement around the temple was named Elapura after the king.

Verul Mahatmya, a text glorifying Ellora (Verul), narrates the same legend with minor variations. The present form of this text was compiled a local Brahmin named Vinayakbuwa Topre in 1844, but it contains stories found in older texts. The text refers to Kokasa as the son of the divine architect Vishvakarma.

Although the inscriptions that refer to the Kailasha Temple do not mention Kokasa, art historian M.K. Dhavalikar theorizes that Kokasa was indeed the architect of this temple, as suggested by medieval texts. According to these texts, Kokasa lived at Paithan, and started his day only after bathing in the Godavari River; at one place, he is said to be living at Puntambe.

== Descendants ==
Epigraphic evidence from present-day Madhya Pradesh and Chhattisgarh suggests that the history of Kokasa's lineage extended for a millennium. Several inscriptions from central India mention sculptors born in his family. According to Dhavalikar, Kokasa's descendants must have moved there from the Paithan region.

=== Palhana and Talhana ===
The 1167 CE Jabalpur copper-plate inscription, issued during the reign of the Tripuri Kalachuri king Jayasimha, refers to two artists descended from "the illustrious Kokāsa family": Pālhaṇa and his son Tālhaṇa. The inscription describes Talhana as a sculptor (rūpakāra), and credits him with engraving the copper-plates with the Sanskrit-language text composed by Vatsa-raja, in Nagari script.

Apart from Kalachuris, Palhana also appears to have worked for the neighbouring Chandela dynasty. Several Chandela period records issued during 1165 to 1178 mention Palhana, describing him as the son of Rajapala.

=== Manmatha, Chhitaku, and Mandana ===
Another set of inscriptions mentions multiple members of the Kokasa lineage, including Manmatha and his sons, Chhitaku (or Chitaku) and Mandana.

The 1495-1496 CE Ratanpur inscription, issued during the reign of king Vahara (or Vaharendra) of Haihaya dynasty, was found at the Mahamaya Temple. It opens with a salutation to the divine architect Vishvakarma, and praises sutra-dhara Chhitaku, calling him as "the light of the Kokasa family". It describes Chhitaku as proficient in various sciences including Shilpa-shastras and machinery, and compares him to the god Narayana in the area of draftsmanship. It states that Chhitaku knew how to carve intricate designs, and could work on wood, stone, and gold with ease. It describes Chhitaku's younger brother Mandana as a reciter of shastras (scriptures), well-versed in astronomy by the grace of Vishvakarma, and devoted to Brahmanas. The inscription was written by Dityana, who is described as a sculptor knowledgeable about "all sciences" and "devoted to his brother": according to scholar R.N. Mishra, Dityana appears to have been a member of the Kokasa family as well.

The Kosgain stone inscription, found north-east of Chhuri (Chhattisgarh), also mentions Manmatha, Chhitaku, and Mandana. It is undated, but was issued during the reign of Vahara, who is known to have ruled during the end of the 15th century and the beginning of the 16th century. The inscription mentions Manmatha as an illustrious sutra-dhara born in the family of Kokasa. It describes his sons Chhitaku and Mandana as the masters of many crafts and as expert sculptors. It states that Chhitaku was the sajaka (decorator) of the inscription, and Mandana had incised its "beautiful" Sanskrit Nagari letters.
