= Vikramaditya II =

Chalukya Emperor from 733 to 744

Chalukya king
- Reign: c. 733 – c. 744 CE
- Predecessor: Vijayaditya
- Successor: Kirtivarman II
- Issue: Kirtivarman II
- Dynasty: Chalukyas of Vatapi
- Father: Vijayaditya

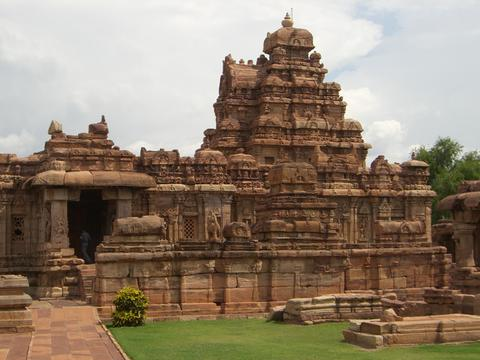
Virupaksha temple, Pattadakal

Vikramaditya II (reigned 733 – 744 CE) was the son of King Vijayaditya and ascended the Badami Chalukya throne following the death of his father. This information comes from the Lakshmeshwar inscriptions in Kannada dated 13 January 735 A.D. From inscriptions it has come to be known that even before his coronation, Vikramaditya II, as a crown prince (Yuvaraja), had conducted successful military campaigns against their arch enemy, the Pallavas of Kanchipuram. His most important achievements were the capture of Kanchipuram on three occasions, the first time as a crown prince, the second time as an emperor and the third time under the leadership of his son and crown prince Kirtivarman II. This is attested to by another Kannada inscription, known as the Virupaksha Temple inscription which alludes to the emperor as the conqueror of Kanchi on three occasions and reads Sri Vikramaditya-bhatarar-mume-Kanchiyan-mume parajisidor. The other notable achievement was the consecration of the famous Virupaksha Temple (Lokeshwara temple) and Mallikarjuna Temple (Trilokeshwara temple) by his queens Lokadevi and Trilokadevi at Pattadakal. These two monuments are the centre piece of the UNESCO World Heritage Monuments at Pattadakal. Vikramaditya II was a powerful ruler. In order to maintain peace he entered into marriage alliance with Rashtrakutas.

== Wars against Pallavas ==
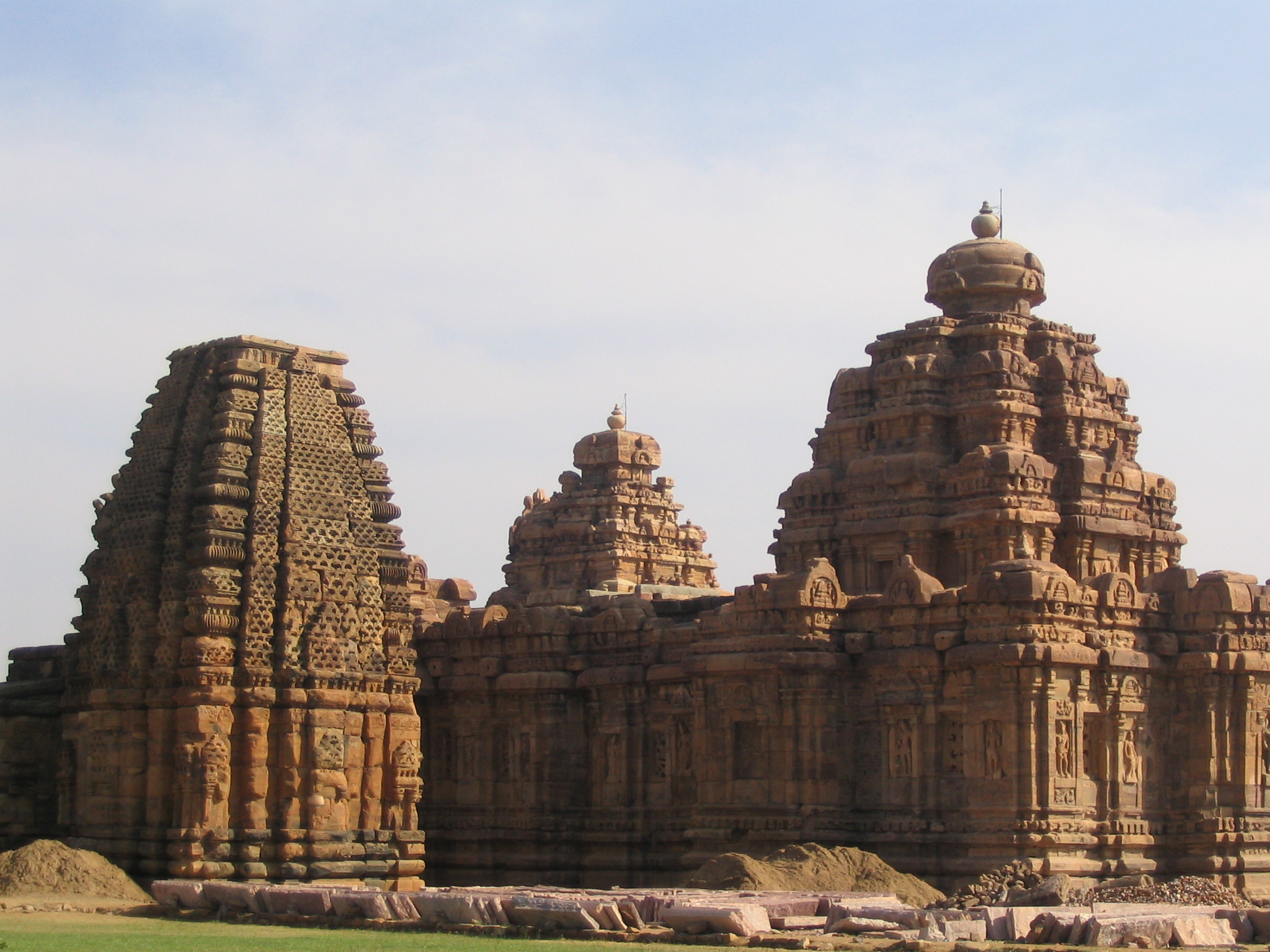
Kashivisvanatha Temple (left) and Mallikarjuna Temple (right)

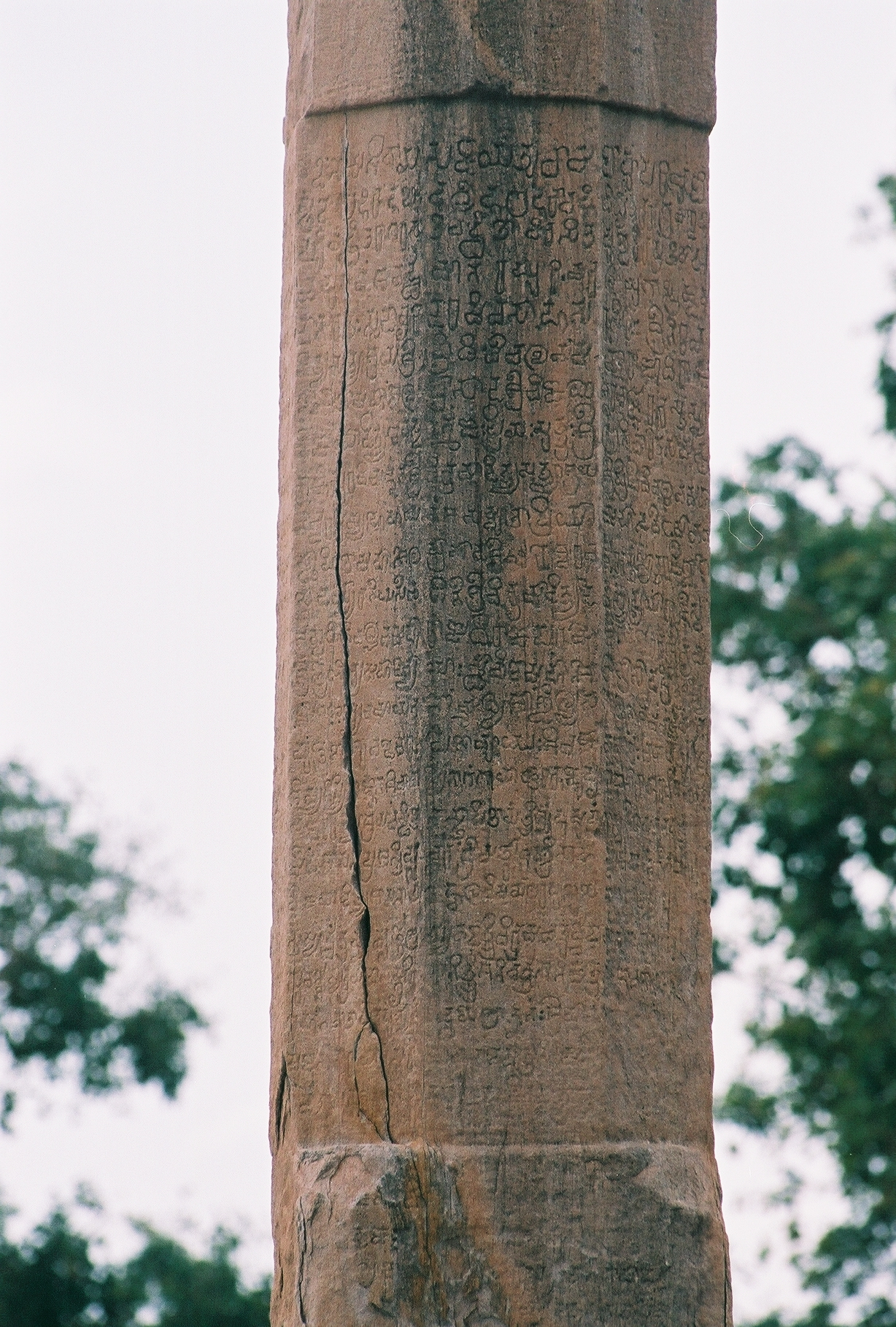
Old Kannada inscription on victory pillar, Virupaksha Temple, Pattadakal, 733–745 CE

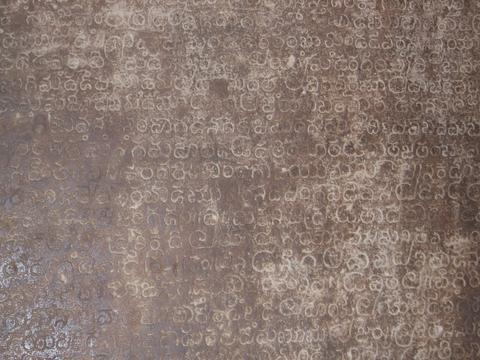
Badami Chalukya inscription in Old Kannada, Virupaksha Temple, Pattadakal

Unlike King Vijayaditya, who had ruled till a very old age in a long and peaceful reign of four decades, Vikramaditya II's inscriptions seem to convey an impatience for war. From those inscriptions, historians feel that he nursed a grudge against the Pallavas, who a century ago, under the leadership of Narasimhavarman I, had defeated the Chalukyas and occupied their regal capital Badami, thus bringing to an end the glorious reign of Pulakeshi II and causing humiliation to the Chalukya royal family. From these inscriptions, it is known that nothing short of complete annihilation of the Pallavas (prakrity-amitra) could redeem the lost dignity of the Chalukyas. Vikarmaditya II, armed with this vengeful enthusiasm (mahotsaha), invaded the Pallava country.

Immediately after coming to power, Vikramaditya II saw an opportunity in the ensuing civil war in Kanchipuram and espoused the cause of Chitramaya, against that of Nandivarma II. Vikramaditya II fought many battles with the Pallavas, won three important victories, and occupied Kanchipuram on those occasions. Around 730, as the Chalukya crown prince, assisted by the Western Ganga Dynasty prince Ereyappa, he attacked the Pallava Paramesvaravarman II. The Pallava king had to sue for peace at a great financial loss to his kingdom. The Pallava subsequently tried to mount a counter-attack at the Ganga ally King Sripurusha (731), but was killed in the battle of Vilande. Sripurusha seized the kings insignia, the royal umbrella and earned the title Permanadi. Though this victory to the Chalukyas happened during the rule of King Vijayaditya, the records of Chalukya monarchs give full credit to Vikramaditya II.

Vikramaditya again invaded the Pallava kingdom after 734, aided by the faithful ally, the Western Ganga King Sripurusha, who joined the Chalukyas in this expedition. The earliest mention of this invasion is in the Narwan plates issued on 21 December 741 or 742. The Pallava King Nandivarman was a 13-year-old boy who nevertheless made a valiant but futile attempt to face the invasion. The Pallava king fled Kanchipuram into exile, leaving behind all his regal attributes which included among other things, a prestigious musical drum (katumukha), a musical instrument (samudraghosa) and a mace. Many of his war elephants, a large quantity of precious stones and gold fell into the hands of the victorious Chalukya monarch.

The road to Kanchipuram lay open and Vikramaditya II entered the city victorious. He ensured that the residents of the city were not harmed nor were the beautiful monuments destroyed (from inscription - Kanchim avinasya pravisya). The bounties of war were also returned. Unlike many conquering kings, Vikramaditya behaved in a very honorable way and showed consideration towards both the inhabitants and the city. Many donations were made to local Brahmins and gifts given to the weak and the forlorn citizens. Vikramaditya II had in his moment of revenge transformed himself from an overbearing conqueror to a humble devotee of the deities in the temples of Kanchipuram. The act of returning large amounts of bounty to the temples earned him religious merit. All that was then inscribed on a Kannada language inscription on the back of a pillar in the mantapa (hall) of the Kailasanatha temple. His benevolent acts at other temples have also been recorded in his copper plate inscriptions. Vikramaditya thus wiped out the disgrace that had fallen on the Chalukya empire by the occupation of Vatapi a century earlier by the Pallava Narasimhavarman I. Having satiated his quest for revenge, Vikramaditya II returned to Badami. The Chalukyan empire then reached its proportions during the rule of Pulakeshi II.

He overran the kingdoms of Chera, Chola and Pandyas and defeated a Kalabhra ruler as well. Those victories were written in his inscription on the shores of the Indian Ocean. The final invasion of Kanchipuram happened in the final years of the reign of Vikramaditya II, under the leadership of his son Kirtivarma II.This time Dantidurga helped Nandivarman II to recover Kanchi by warring against the Chalukyas and won the war.

== Conflict with Arabs ==
In the early years of Vikramaditya's reign, Arab invaders who had established themselves in the Sindh made a push into the Deccan during the Umayyad campaigns in India. Avanijanashraya Pulakeshin, a son of Vikramaditya I's brother Jayasimhavarman who was the governor of the Lata branch (Gujarat) fought and defeated an Umayyad army in 739 CE. Vikramaditya II so appreciated his valour, he conferred the title of Avanijanasraya (refuge of the people of the earth) on Pulakeshin. The Rashtrakuta King Dandivarma or Dantidurga also fought along the Chalukyas against the Arabs.

== Rule ==
Vikramaditya II donated 50 nivartanas of land for maintenance of charity house of Dhavala-Jinalaya at Lakshmeshwara, Dharwad district in 735 CE.
