= Ratta dynasty =

9th-13th century dynasty in India

- 9th century–13th century
- Capital: Saundatti & Belgaum
- Religion: Jainism
- Government: Monarchy
- History
  - Established: 9th century
  - Disestablished: 13th century
Preceded by	Succeeded by
Rashtrakutas	Yadava Dynasty
- Today part of: Karnataka

Ratta was a minor dynasty who ruled over the Belagavi region of the Karnataka as a branch of Rashtrakutas. Savadatti (Saundatti), historically known as Sugandavarti was the capital of Ratta dynasty during 875-1250 CE period. Later their capital shifted to Belagavi (Belgaum) which is historically known as Venugrama. Belgaum was the capital of the Rattas during 1210 to 1250 A.D.

== Forts of Rattas ==
=== Parasgad Fort ===
Parasgad Fort is a ruined hill fort in the Belgaum district of Karnataka state, India. magnificent fort of Parashghad, dating back to the 10th century and built by famous rulers of Ratta dynasty Parasgad Fort is located about two kilometres south of Saundatti village, and stands on the south-west edge of a range of hills immediately overlooking the black soil plain down below. The hill which measures about 500 metres (1,640 ft) from north to south and about 300 metres (984 ft) from east to west, is irregular, and a good deal is covered with prickly pear and brushwood. Its sides are rocky and almost perpendicular. A deep gorge runs through it.

=== Belgaum Fort ===
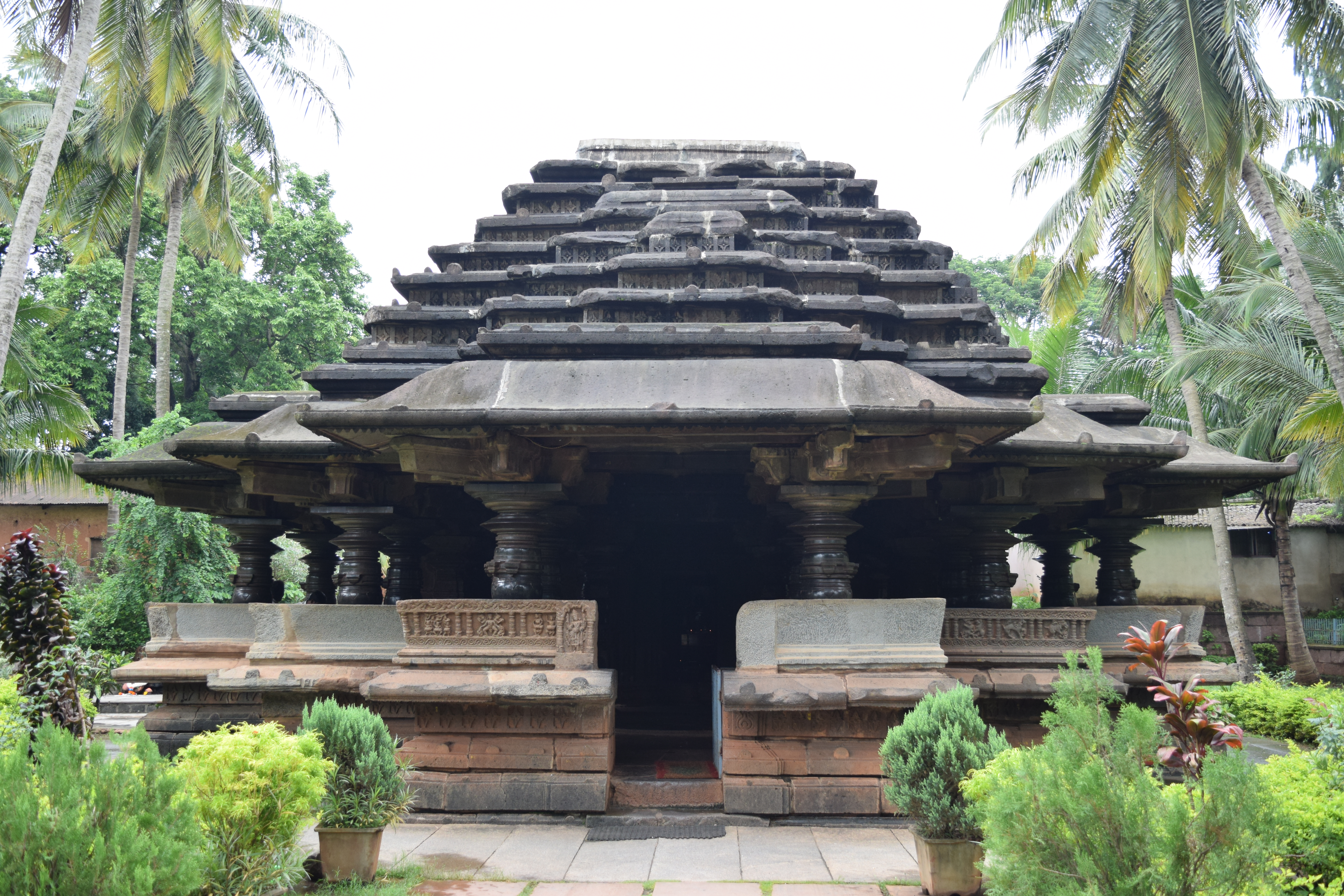
Kamal Basadi

In 1204, Belgaum Fort was built by chief Jaya Raja, who was also known as Bichi Raja. Later, the Yadavas of Devagiri defeated Rattas and captured the Belgaum Fort. The Belgaum fort (Originally built by the Ratta dynasty, later fortified by Yakub Ali Khan of the Bijapur Sultanate) was well known for its unique building structure and its huge moat surrounding the fort, which made it inaccessible to the enemies. The Belgaum fort served as a bulwark against the attacks of invading armies. It steadfastly held fort as Belgaum played host to a multitude of dynasties, from the Rattas, the Vijayanagar emperors, Bijapur Sultans, Marathas and finally the British. During the freedom movement of India, Mahatma Gandhi was imprisoned here. The inside of the fort is stretched about 1000 yards long and 800 yards broad. The fort was well built as a Military store. An ancient Jain temple (Kamal Basadi) is also present inside the fort.

Belgaum Fort has been ruled by Dynasties such as Kadambas, Rashtra Kutas, Kalyan Chalukyas, Rattas, Bahamanis, Marathas. In the year 1778 it was under Tipu Sultan kingdom. In 1818, Gen. Munro British Officer took over the fort & built houses inside the Fort for Residence of Army Officers.

== Jainism ==
Rattas were patrons of Jainism. In 11th century AD, Jain saint Munichandra (Acarya, the founder of Ratta-rajya) was a teacher and minister to chief Laksmideva (son of Kartivirya).

== Kannada literature ==
- Parshvanatha purana was written by Jain writer Parsva Pandita.
- Pushpadanta purana, the story of 9th Jain tirthankar Pushpadanta was written by Jain writer Gunavarma II.

== See also ==
- Origin of Rashtrakuta Dynasty
- Branches of Rashtrakuta Dynasty
- Saundatti
