= Kambarasa =

Rashtrakuta prince

Governor of Gangavadi
- In office 788 CE – Upon death

Personal details
- Parent: Dhruva Dharavarsha (father)

Kambarasa also known as Stambha and as Ranavaloka, was a member and prince of the Rashtrakuta dynasty. He was the oldest living son of Dhruva Dharavarsha his illustrious father, and was appointed the governor of Gangavadi. He had always longed for the Rashtrakuta imperial throne in his youth, and wanted the throne for himself after his father's death, but was defeated by his younger brother and heir-apparent Govinda III, but was spared by him, and once more was allowed to govern Gangavadi.

== The Struggle for Succession ==
According to the Navasari record, Kambarasa went to war having formed an alliance of twelve rulers. Shivamara II of the Western Ganga Dynasty of Talakad had joined hands with Kambarasa, but after the defeat was he imprisoned for a second time by the Rashtrakutas while Kambarasa was spared and pardoned by his younger brother and emperor Govinda III, and was allowed to govern from Gangavadi again.
