= Govinda II =

Rashtrakuta Emperor from 774 to 780

- Prabhutavarsha; Jagattunga; Maharajadhiraja; Pratapavaloka; SriVallabha

Rashtrakuta Emperor
- Reign: c. 774 – c. 780 CE
- Predecessor: Krishna I
- Successor: Dhruva Dharavarsha
- Died: c. 780 CE; Manyakheta, Rashtrakuta Empire (modern day Karnataka, India)
- Dynasty: Rashtrakuta
- Father: Krishna I
- Religion: Jainism

Govinda II or "Vallabha" (Kannada: ಇಮ್ಮಡಿ ಗೋವಿಂದಾ)(r. 774 – 780 CE) was the Rashtrakuta emperor and succeeded his father, Krishna I. The eldest son of Krishna I, Govinda II left the administration to his younger brother, the prince Dhruva Dharavarsha (who was also known as Nirupama or Kalivallabha). Apart from his dedication to sensual pleasures and an invasion of Vengi and the subsequent defeat of Eastern Chalukya ruler Vishnuvardhana IV (when his father Krishna I was still the Rashtrakuta emperor), not much is known about Govinda II. It seems his younger brother Dhruva did most of the conquering, as the empire reached three times the size it was during the time of Krishna I. A Paithan copper plate inscription states that an attempt by Govinda II to regain his lost control over the empire with the help of neighboring rulers of Malwa, Kanchi i.e. Nandivarman II and Vengi i.e. Vishnuvardhana IV failed and that Dhruva Dharavarsha brought the empire firmly under his control.

The Pimperi copper plates of Dhārāvarṣa-Dhruvadeva clearly mention that Govindarāja was called "Vallabha" (Vallabhākhyaḥ). The Rāṣṭrakūṭa kings were in general called "Vallabha". In the concluding praśasti of a Jain chronicle Harivaṃśapurāṇa, Acharya Jinasena states Govinda II (as "Shrivallabha") was on the throne during Śaka 705. It records that he ruled the South, while Indradyumna ruled the North, Vatsaraja governed the East, and Varaha (or Jayavaraha) the Saurya (Saurashtra) territory.

Preceded by Krishna I	Rashtrakuta Emperor; 774–780	Succeeded by Dhruva Dharavarsha
