= Sripurusha =

Western Ganga King from 726 to 788 CE

Sripurusha (Muttarasa, Rajakesari, Bhimakopa, Ranabhajana)
- Muttarasa, Rajakesari, Bhimakopa, Ranabhajana

13th Western Ganga King
- Reign: c. 726 – c. 788 CE (62 years)
- Predecessor: Shivamara I
- Successor: Shivamara II
- Dynasty: Ganga dynasty
- Religion: Jainism

Sripurusha (also known by titles such as Muttarasa, Rajakesari, Bhimakopa, and Ranabhajana) was a powerful king of the Western Ganga Dynasty king who ruled from 726 – 788 CE. According to the Javali inscription Sripurusha ruled for 62 years. He had marital relations with the Badami Chalukyas. and An able warrior and a scholar, he authored the Sanskrit work Gajasastra. He is known to have undertaken significant irrigation projects such as the construction of a dam (Katta). and He is also celebrated for both military achievements and Jain patronage.

== Politics of the South ==
The rule of Sripurusha Muttarasa seems to have been filled with conflicts with the Pallavas of Kanchi, Pandyas, later the Rashtrakutas who overthrew the Vatapi Chalukyas. In 731 CE he defeated Pallava King Nandivarman II and assumed the title "Permanadi"His capital was shifted to "Manne" (Manyapura) near Nelamangala, now identified as a Ganga stronghold. He had good relations with Chalukyas and had helped them fight the Pallavas during the rule of Vikramaditya II and later he fought the Pandyas during the rule of Chalukya Kirtivarman II but suffered reversal at Venbai. When the Rashtrakutas rose to power, though betrayed by the Nolambas, Sripurusha had many victories against Krishna I and occupied some Ratta territories. This resistance to Rashtrakutas continued for some time before the Gangas normalised their relationship with martial alliances.

== Religion and Patronage ==
Sripurusha continued the Ganga legacy of Jain support. Charters from his reign document land grants for monasteries such as the "Lokatilaka Jinalaya" and "Kongeśvara Jina caityālaya", and recorded Jain festivals like "Nandisvara" and "Sripanchami" that endured for centuries

== Literature and Legacy ==
Sripurusha was a scholar-king who authored the Sanskrit treatise "Gajasastra", focused on elephant management. His reign cemented a dynastic tradition combining martial power, cultural advancement, and religious pluralism. The Doddahundi nishidhi inscription, raised by his son Satyavakya, immortalizes a Jain ritual site honoring his dynasty’s religious identity.

== Bibliography ==
- Nagarajaiah, Hampa. (2006). History of Early Ganga Monarchy and Jainism. Bangalore: Jaina Cultural Trust. pp. 66–67.
- RamuBangalore. (2013). “Suttha Muttha: The lost capital of the Gangas,” Ramubangalore Blog.
- JainQQ (2009). Medieval Jainism, Jain Quantum Publication. pp. 39–40.
- Shastriyakannada. (2025). “GANGAS OF TALAKADU,” Shastriya Kannada Portal.
- PSCNotes (2025). “History of Karnataka from Vedic age to Gupta Period,” PSC Exams Notes.
- DoddahundiInscription, Epigraphia Carnatica Vol. 9. Dasarahalli inscriptions and hero stones.
- Dr. Suryanath U. Kamat, Concise history of Karnataka, 2001, MCC, Bangalore (Reprint 2002)
