= Kamal Basadi =

Jain temples in the state of Karnataka

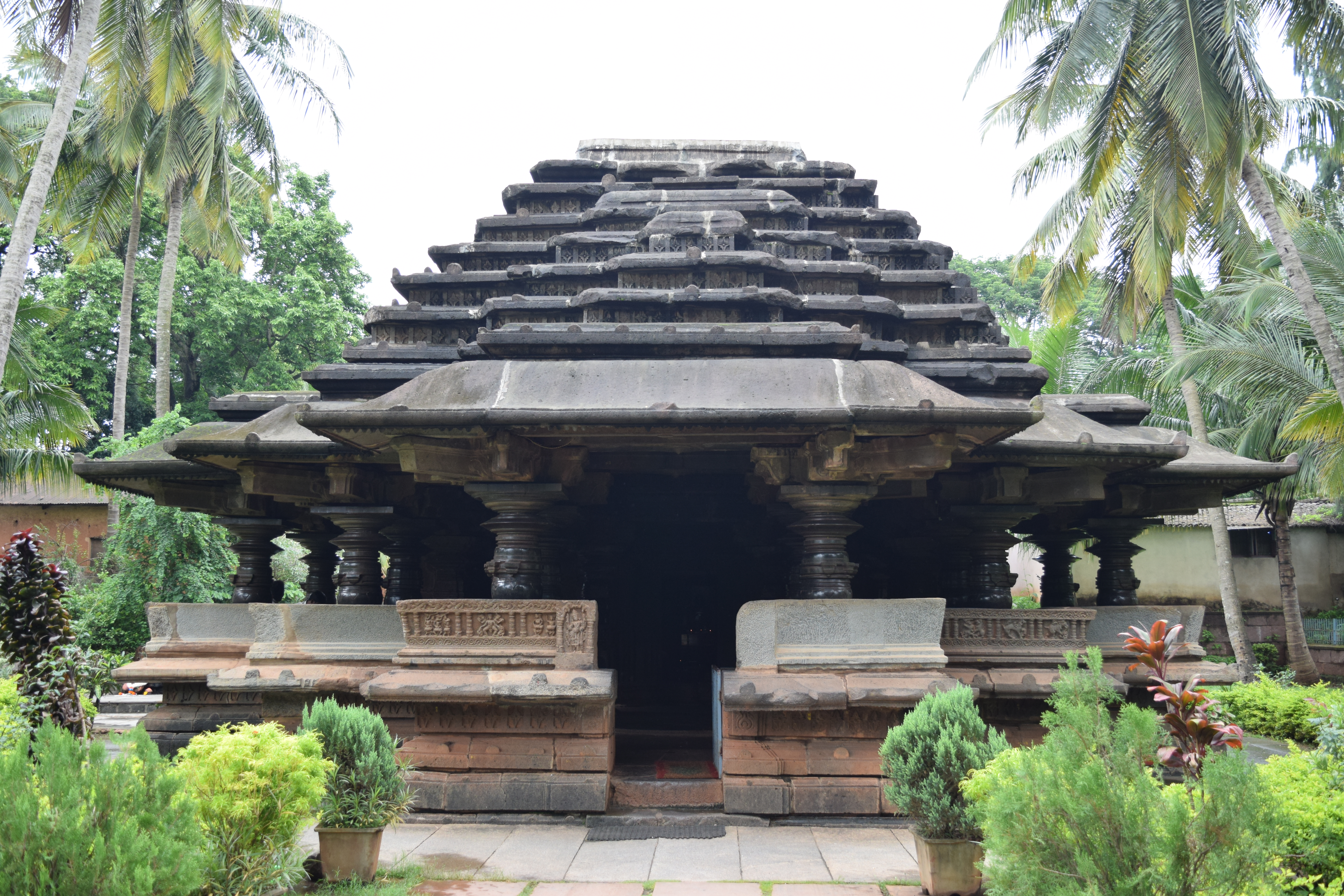
- Kamal Basadi

Religion
- Affiliation: Jainism
- Sect: Digambar
- Deity: Neminatha
- Festival: Mahavir Jayanti
- Governing body: Shree Shree 1008 Neminath Tirthankar Digambar Jain Mandir Pooja Committee

Location
- Location: Belgaum, Karnataka
- Interactive map of Kamal Basadi
- Coordinates: 15°51′29″N 74°31′17″E

Architecture
- Style: Western Chalukya architecture
- Creator: Birchiraja
- Established: 1204 CE
- Temple: 3

Kamal Basadi is a Jain temple located inside Belgaum Fort in city of Belgaum, Karnataka.

== History ==
The Kamal Basadi was built by Birchiraja, also called Jaya Raya, an officer in the court of Kartavirya IV of Ratta dynasty in c. 1204 CE under the guidance of Jain monk Subhachandrabhattarakadeva. According to two stone tablets, now placed inside Royal Asiatic Society branch in Mumbai, an inscription dating back to 1205 CE the temple was constructed by the architect Kartaviryadeva and yuvrajakumara mallikarjunadeva.

== Architecture ==
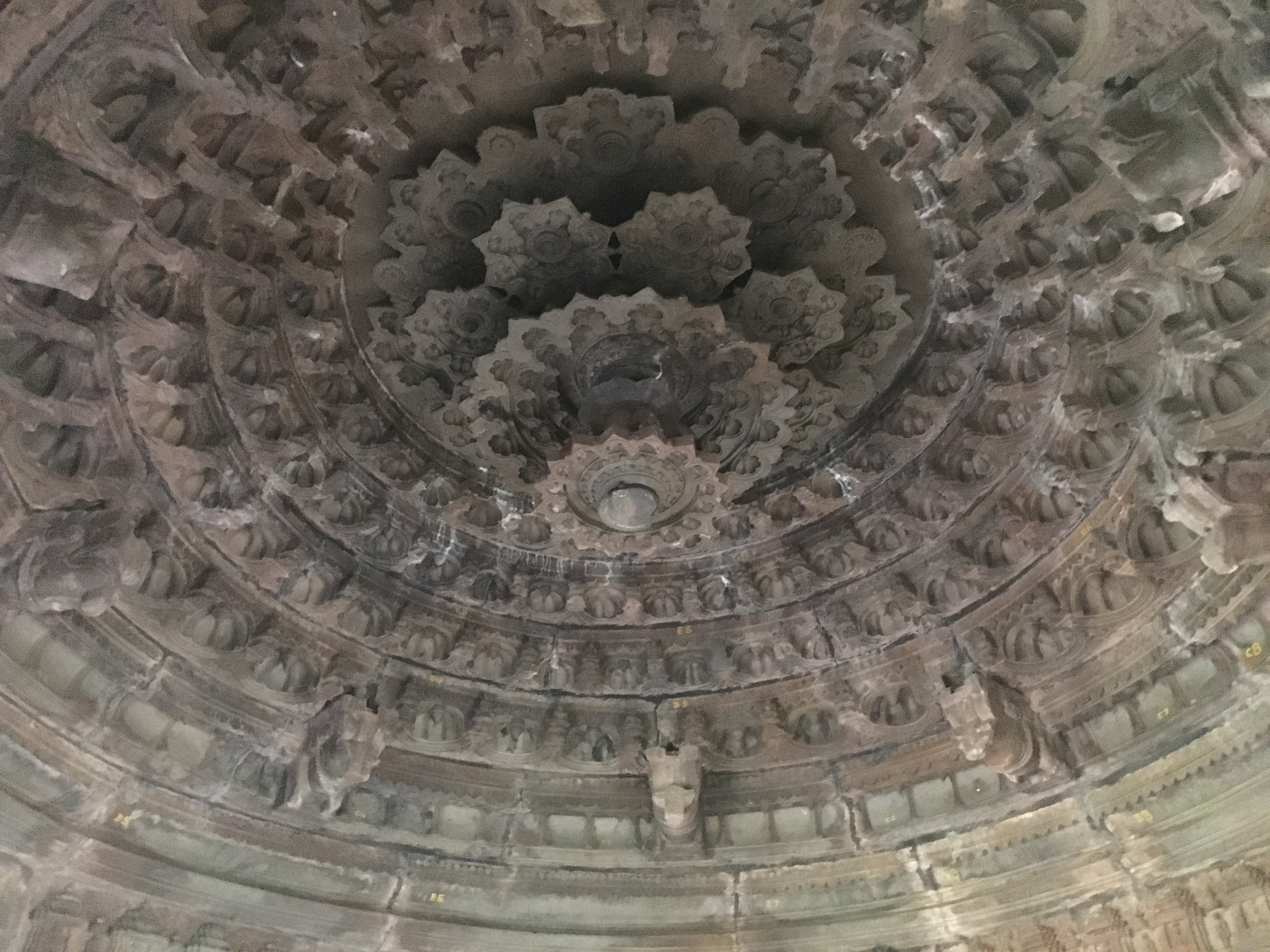
Ceiling

The Kamal Basadi derives its name from the lotus carvings extending from the dome of the centre roof. The lotus has 72 petals believed to represent 24 tirthankaras of past, present and future. The walls of the temple are engraved with intricate designs, borders, and sculptures. The wall of the temple is supported by pillars with the carving of a cobra at the end of every bracket. The pillars are well-carved with decorations and neatly polished. The shrine has a richly carved doorway. There are a total of five small cells housing idols of tirthankaras; between these cells are four yaksha and yakshi in standing posture under a small canopy. The pillars inside the garbhagriha are square and massive. On each side of the door, there are niches in the wall that have carvings of Jain divinities.

The mukhamandapa of the temple is considered an architectural masterpiece. The temple ceiling of the central features a pendant in the middle and carvings of ashṭa-dikpāla in each corner of the pillars; eight makara brackets, and on the lower octagonal part of the dome are niches of Tirthankaras in padmasan and kayotsarga. The mulnayak of the temple is black color idol of Neminatha. the temple also houses the idols of Rishabhanatha is padmasan posture, Sumatinatha in kayotsarga posture and Parshvanatha with seven-headed serpent overhead. The temple also features a monolithic idol of Navagraha represented by nine Tirthankaras. The door of the inner hall, the original outer door of the temple, is richly carved and features an image of a seated Jina.

The Chikki Basadi and a priest's house is located near the Kamala Basadi.

== In popular culture ==
To commemorate the 816th anniversary of Kamala Basadi a special postal cover was released on 23 December 2020.

== Gallery ==
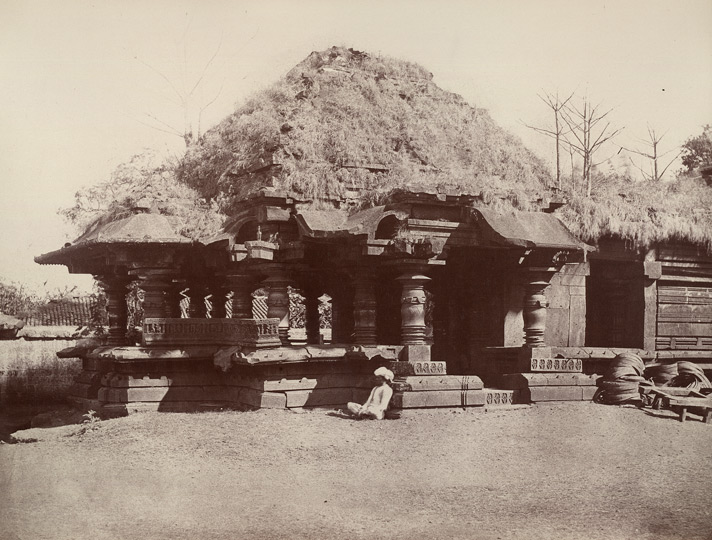
Kamala Basadi in 1855

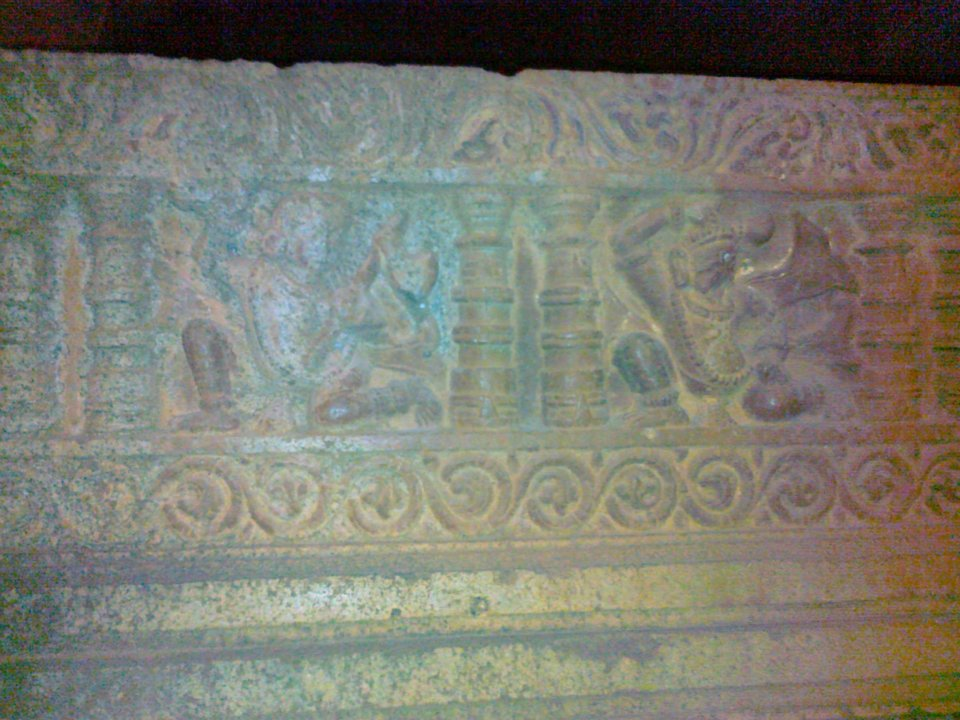
Carvings on temple wall

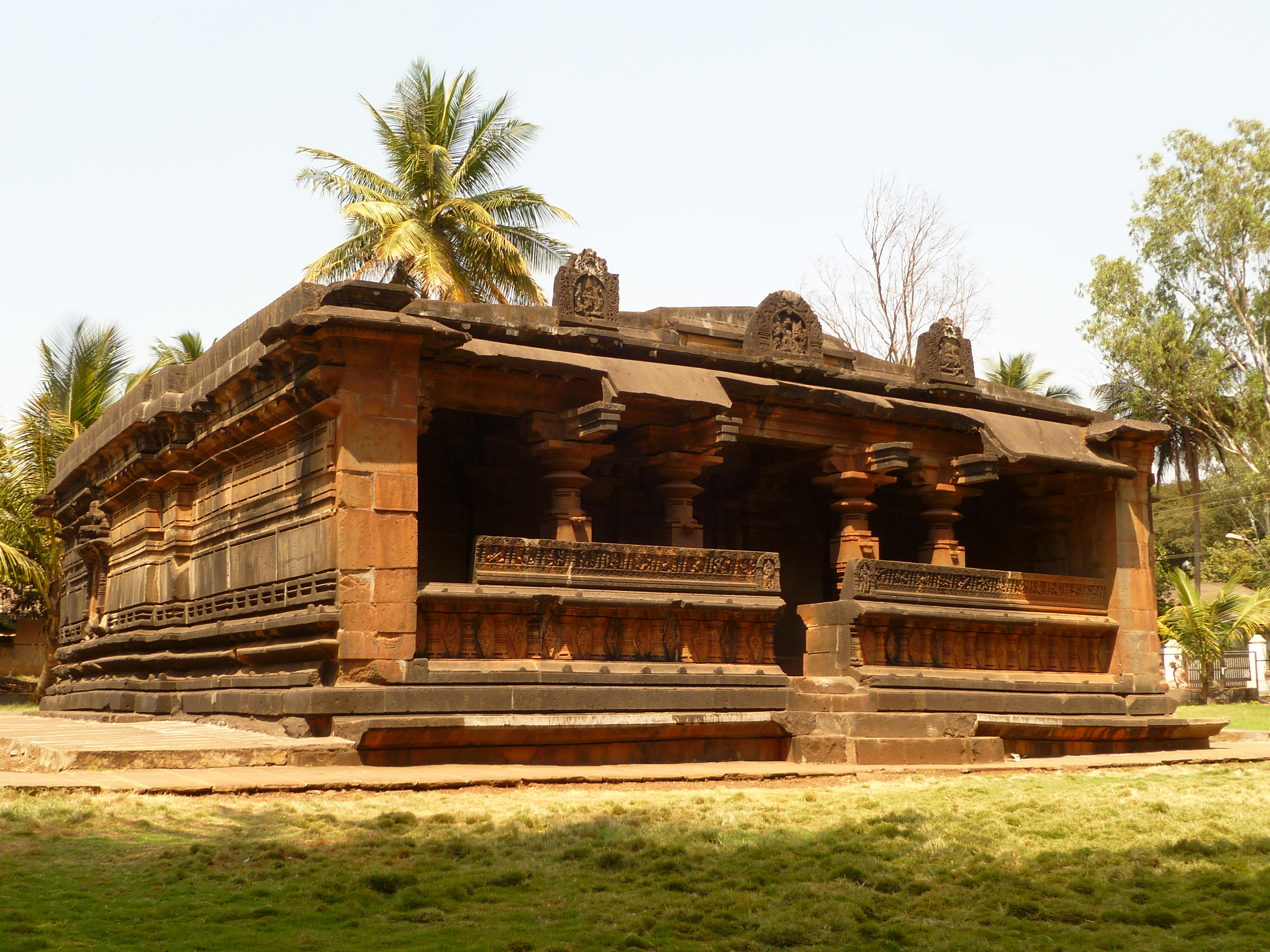
Chikki Basadi
