= Shivamara II =

Western Ganga King from 788 to 816 CE

14th Western Ganga King
- Reign: c. 788 – c. 816 CE
- Predecessor: Sripurusha
- Successor: Rachamalla I
- Dynasty: Ganga dynasty

Saigotta Shivamara or Shivamara II was the son of Sripurusha and ruled the Western Ganga Dynasty from 788 – 816 C.E. He was also a noted scholar in Kannada, Sanskrit and Prakrit. He succeeded to the Ganga throne during a time when the Rashtrakuta were the empire on the rise in South India and the Deccan.

== Conflict with Rashtrakuta ==
The Rashtrakuta monarch Dhruva Dharavarsha defeated Shivamara in Mudagunduru war and took the Ganga king captive. The Rashtrakuta then took direct control of the Gangavadi with the appointment of Kambharasa, son of Dhruva Dharavarsha as its governor. He was later released, only to be imprisoned again during the rule of Govinda III when he refused to pay the Rashtrakuta tribute. Shivamara II again was released only to defy the Rashtrakuta yoke by waging wars. He died fighting them in 816. Manne near Bangalore was one of his capitals during this time.

== Literary work ==
In spite of being imprisoned on multiple occasions and being at constant war, he found the time to write literary works, including Gajashtaka in Kannada, Gajamathakalpana in Sanskrit and Sethubandha in Prakrit.

According to historian Kamath, he is considered to be one of the famous kings of the Western Ganga Dynasty.
