= Kirtivarman II =

Chalukya Emperor from 744 to 753

Chalukya king
- Reign: c. 746 – c. 753
- Predecessor: Vikramaditya II
- Successor: Position abolished
- Issue: Vijayaditya II
- Dynasty: Chalukyas of Vatapi
- Father: Vikramaditya II

Kirtivarman II (reigned 746–753) was the last ruler in the Badami Chalukya dynasty. He succeeded his father Vikramaditya II. His reign was continuously troubled by the growing power of the Rashtrakutas and Pandyas and finally succumbed to them.

== Conflict with the Pandyas ==
Kirtivarman and his Ganga feudatory Sripurusha came into conflict with the Pandya ruler Maravarman Rajasimha I who was extending the Pandya empire on to the Kongu country which was adjacent to the Ganga kingdom. Rajasimha crossed the Kaveri and engaged Kirtivarman and Sripurusha in a big battle at Venbai on the banks of the river Kaveri. The Chalukya king was defeated.

== Diminishing power ==
Kirtivarman was steadily undermined by the activities of Rashtrakuta Dantidurga who was establishing the Rashtrakuta Empire. Dantidurga was a feudatory of the Chalukyas and was beginning to establish an independent kingdom around Ellora.

Kirtivarman II was plagued by intense outside pressure: by the Pandays under Rajasimha in the south, and Rashtrakutas under Dantidurga in the north. Dantidurga managed to wrest control of the northern provinces of the Chalukyan kingdom, he also completely surrounded the Chalukya in the east and the south by conquering the Telugu provinces, Kalinga and Kosala kingdoms. Dantidurga also went into an alliance with the Pallava Nandivarman II. Thus isolated, Kirtivarman could not turn to any direction for help.

In 750, the Chalukyas conceded their southern provinces to Rajasimha in a huge defeat at Veṇbai. The final assault on Kirtivarman came in 752 and completely overwhelmed the Chalukyan kingdom.

Kirtivarman II was the last king of the Badami dynasty.

== Vijayaditya II ==
Vijayaditya II
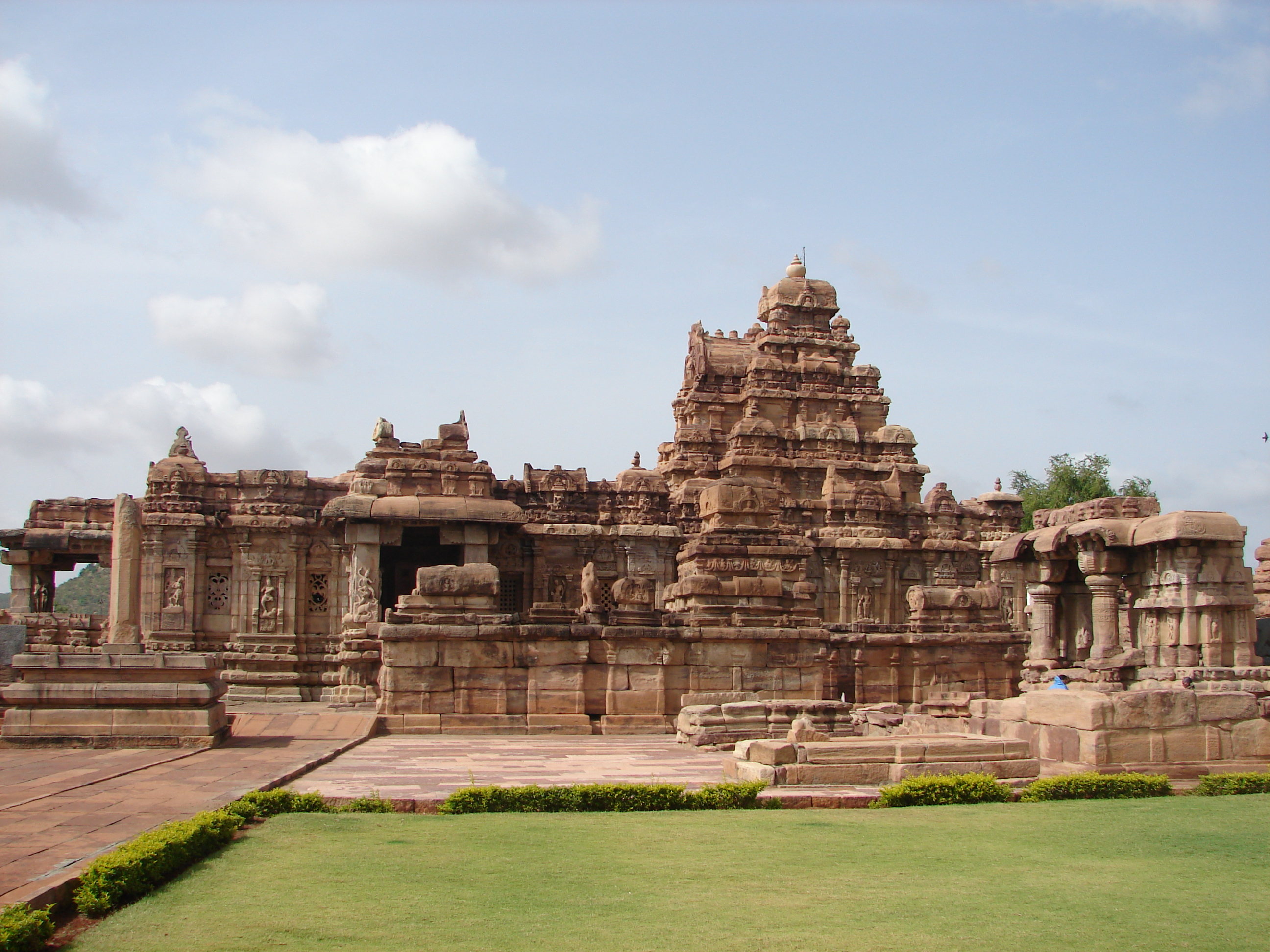
- 8th-century Chalukya temple

Crown Prince of the Badami Chalukya dynasty
- Born: c. 738 CE; Vātāpi
- Died: Unknown (after 774 CE); Unknown
- Father: Kirtivarman II

Vijayaditya II (born c. 738 CE), son of Kirtivarman II, was crown prince of the Badami Chalukya dynasty until its destruction in 753 by the Rashtrakutas. The young prince narrowly escaped a grim fate at Vātāpi (Badami) by fleeing south.

At a young age, Vijayaditya II married a princess from the neighboring Ganga kingdom, a subordinate kingdom to the southwest. When Dantidurga's army reached Vātāpi in 753, Vijayaditya II and his wife escaped the bloodshed by fleeing to Ganga territory, where he lived for many years by the grace of the Ganga king Sripurusha. He departed on a journey north in 774 CE, after which his whereabouts are unknown.

Vijayaditya II's descendant, Tailapa II, would go on some 220 years later to found the Western Chalukya Empire, reviving the lost dynasty in 973.

| Preceded by Vikramaditya II | Chalukyas; 746 –753 | Succeeded by Dantidurga (Rashtrakuta) |
