= Nerur =

Nerur may refer to:

- Nerur, Maharashtra, a place in Maharashtra, India
- Nerur (Tamil Nadu), a place in Tamil Nadu, India
