= Dhruva Dharavarsha =

Rashtrakuta emperor from 780 to 793

- Maharajadhiraja; Dharavarsha; Nirupama; Srivallabha; Kalivallabha
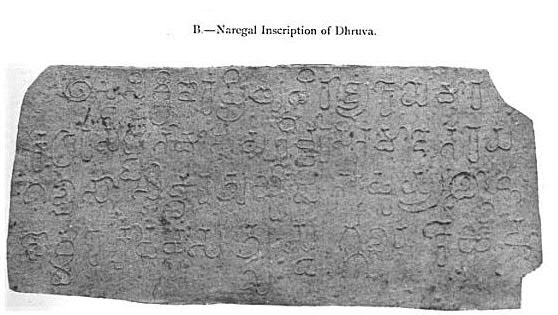
- Fragment of Old Kannada inscription (780 CE) from Naregal of Rashtrakuta emperor Dhruva Dharavarsha

4th Rashtrakuta Emperor
- Reign: c. 780 – c. 793 CE (13 years)
- Predecessor: Govinda II
- Successor: Govinda III
- Co-ruler: Sila Mahadevi
- Died: 793 CE; Manyakheta, Rashtrakuta Empire (modern day Karnataka, India)
- Spouse: Sila Mahadevi of the Eastern Chalukyas
- Issue: Karka Suvarnavarsha; Kambarasa; Govinda III; Indra, Governor of Lata
- Father: Krishna I
- Religion: Jainism Hinduism

Dhruva Dharavarsha (r. 780 – 793 CE) Also known as "Kalivallabha" was one of the most notable rulers of the Rashtrakuta Empire. He ascended the imperial throne after replacing his elder brother Govinda II, who had become unpopular among his subjects on account of his various misconducts as a monarch, including excessive indulgence in sensual pleasures. This according to the historian Kamath is evident from the Karhad plates of Krishna III. The Dhulia grant of 779 and Garugadahalli inscription of 782 proclaim Dhruva the emperor. Though some historians claim that Dhruva revolted and grabbed the throne, other historians feel the transition of the throne from Govinda II to Dhruva was peaceful and may have happened willingly. He earned titles like Kalivallabha, Srivallabha, Dharavarsha, Maharajadhiraja and Parameshvara.

== Success in north and east ==
Dhruva Dharavarsha had a high political aspiration and he actively pursued the goal of expanding the frontiers of Rashtrakuta dominion. In Northern India, he subjugated the rulers of Kanyakubja. In central India, he defeated Vatsaraja of the Gurjara Prathihara Empire, and Dharmapala of the Pala Empire (who was eager to rule Kanyakubja) in a battle in the Ganges - Yamuna doab. However, these great victories brought him no permanent land gains but only a lot of material gain and fame. However another historian has claimed that Dhruva's empire stretched from Ayodhya in the north to Rameshvaram in the south.

== Victories in the Deccan and the South ==
He humbled Vishnuvardhana IV, an Eastern or Vengi Chalukya king in 784 and forged an alliance by marrying his daughter named Silabhattarika as per the Jetvai grant of 786. Thereafter, he defeated Shivamara II, the Western Ganga Dynasty ruler of Gangavadi, and imprisoned him and appointed his own son, the Prince Kambarasa as the governor. He also forced the Pallava monarch Nandivarman II to accept the suzerainty of the Rashtrakutas who paid him handsomely with many elephants. He undertook campaigns to Kanchi in 785 and again against the Western Ganga Dynasty in 788.

== Religion ==
Dhruva Dharavarsha's inscriptions use titles such as "Shri Vallabha", "Kali Vallabha", "Maharajadhiraja", "Dharavarsha", and "Parameshvara". These titles were standard royal epithets commonly used by medieval Indian kings, but are also found in Jain donor inscriptions across the Deccan, suggesting a cultural environment that included Jain influences. "Vallabha" itself appears as an honorific in Jain inscriptions and donor records. Dhruva Dharavarsha is recorded to have patronised the Jain Acharya Virasena, under whose guidance the famous Jain text Dhavala a commentary on Jain canon Shatakhandagama was written, and work on "Jayadhavalaa" and "Mahadavala" also Started which was completed by his disciples Acharya Gunasena Epigraphic evidence from his reign shows sustained royal patronage of Jain monks, temples, and scholars across the Deccan.

Rastrakuta rulers, despite their deep ties with Jainism, maintained a tradition of religious tolerance and supported various faiths, including Hindu sects like Shivism and Vaishnavism. Many of their inscriptions begin by specifying the temple or religious institution to which the grant or donation is being made, rather than invoking a single deity. This inclusive approach helped lay the groundwork for the dynasty's reputation.

== Pan-Indian power ==
During his reign, the Rashtrakutas emerged as a true pan-Indian power, controlling large regions across the Indian subcontinent. He was succeeded by his third son, Govinda III whose reign was also marked by brilliant military success and exploits.

His queen Sila Mahadevi, who bore the titles Paramesvari ("World Ruler") and Paramabhattarika ("Ritual Sovereign"), was his co-ruler.

== Notes ==
Preceded by Govinda II	Rashtrakuta Emperor; 780–793	Succeeded by Govinda III
