= Mhaismal =

Station in India

Coordinates: 20°05′N 75°11′E

Mhaismal is a hill station located in the Chatrapati Sambhaji Nagar District of Maharashtra, India, at an altitude of 1,067 meters. It spans an area of approximately 10,000 m^{2}, about 40 km from Aurangabad city, and is known for its tropical deciduous forest. Most of the hill is owned by the forest department.

The route to Mhaismal passes the Ellora Caves, Grishneshwar Temple, and Devgiri Fort.
