= Vishnuvardhana IV =

Eastern Chalukyan emperor from 772 to 808

Eastern Chalukyan emperor
- Reign: 772–808 AD
- Predecessor: Vijayaditya I (755–772 AD)
- Successor: Vijayaditya II (808–847 AD)
- Issue: Vijayaditya II (808–847 AD); Silabhattarika
- Dynasty: Vengi/Eastern Chalukyas

Vishnuvardhana IV was the tenth king of the Eastern Chalukyas, which ruled the region of Vengi. He reigned from 772 to 808. He had marital ties with the imperial Rashtrakutas. The Rashtrakuta emperor Dhruva Dharavarsha married Vishnuvardhana IV's daughter, Silabhattarika, to forge an alliance with the Western Ganga Dynasty after defeating and humbling him in 784. His predecessor was Vijayaditya I (755 – 772 AD) and was succeeded by Vijayaditya II (808 – 847 AD).
