= Dantidurga =

Founder of the Rashtrakuta Empire

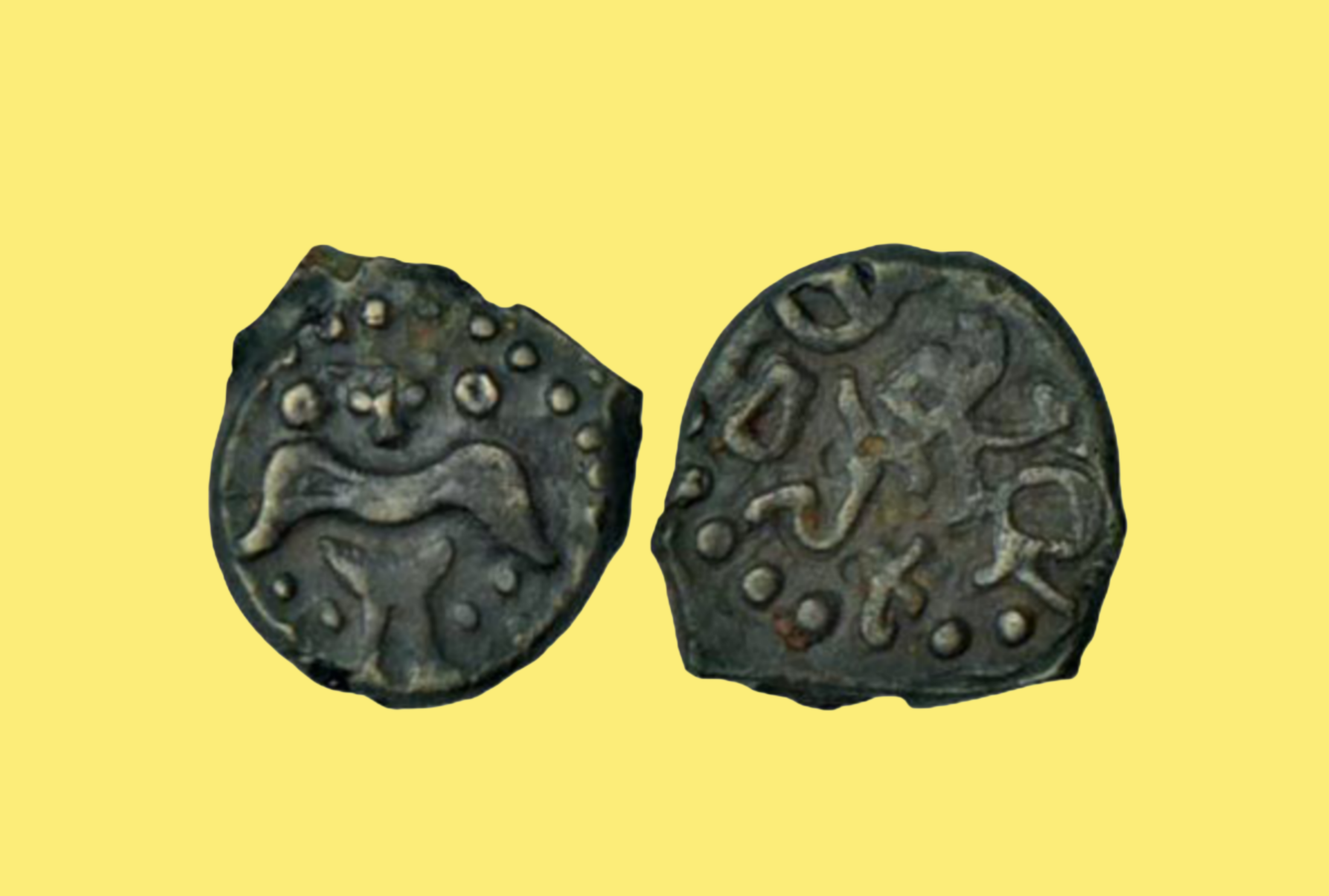
- A Coin Attributed to Dantidurga, founder of the Rashtrakuta dynasty

Emperor of Rashtrakuta Empire
- Reign: c. 753 – c. 756 CE
- Predecessor: Indra II
- Successor: Krishna I
- Died: c. 756 CE
- Father: Indra II
- Mother: Bhavanaga
- Religion: Jainism

Dantidurga (reigned 753–756 CE), also known as Dantivarman II, was the founder of the Rashtrakuta Empire of Manyakheta. His capital was based in Kalburgi region of Karnataka. His successor was his uncle Krishna I who extended his kingdom to all of Karnataka.

The Ellora record of Dantidurga narrates that he defeated the Chalukyas in 753 and took the titles Rajadhiraja and Parameshvara. The inscription calls him son of Indra II. The Samangad inscription (modern Kolhapur district, Maharashtra) states his mother was a Chalukyan princess from Gujarat called Bhavanaga. The same inscription states he defeated the infinite and invincible Karnataka-Bala (Karnataka army) of the Badami Chalukyas. Further he defeated the kings of Lata (Gujarat), Malwa, Tanka, Kalinga and Sheshas (Nagas) in central India and performed many sacrifices. Though he conquered the Chalukyan Empire, it is clear from the Vakkaleri inscription of 757 that the Chalukyan Emperor Kirtivarman II retained control over his southern provinces up to the year 757. His daughter was married to a Pallava King Nandivarman II of Kanchi. Dantidurga helped Nandivarman recover Kanchi by warring against the Chalukyas.

The Navasari grant (c.739) throws light on his achievements in the era prior to Rashtrakuta independence. The Arab intention might have been to make inroads into South India. However, to the south of the Mahi River lay the powerful Chalukyan empire. The Chalukya victory at Navsari, Avanijanashraya Pulakeshi, decisively defeated the invading Arab forces as documented in the grant. The Tājika (Arab) army defeated was one that had attacked "Kacchella, Saindhava, Saurashtra, Cavotaka, Maurya and Gurjara" kings. Viceroy Pulakesi subsequently received the titles "Solid Pillar of Deccan" (Dakshināpatha-sādhāra) and the "Repeller of the Unrepellable" (Anivartaka-nivartayitr). The Rashtrakuta prince Dantidurga, who was subsidiary to Chalukyas at this time, also played an important role in the battle. Dantidurga was a clever diplomat but at the same time used military power to expand his empire's boundaries. By 750 AD Dantidurga had brought Madhya Pradesh and Southern Gujarat under his control.

== Religion ==
Inscriptions of Dantidurga, the founder of the Rashtrakuta dynasty, refer to him using imperial titles such as "Paramabhattaraka", "Prithivivallabha", "Maharajadhiraja", and "Parameshvara". While these titles were common royal epithets across medieval India regardless of religious affiliation, they are frequently found in Jain inscriptions across the Deccan, reflecting the inclusive religious environment of the Rashtrakuta court.

The Rashtrakutas, despite their strong Jain leanings, were noted for their patronage of multiple faiths, including Vaishnavism and Shaivism. Many of their inscriptions begin by specifying the temple or religious institution to which the grant or donation is being made, rather than invoking a single deity. During Rashtrakuta reign, Jain scholors, Kannada poets, monks, temples, and Jain religious institutions flourished. Inscriptions from their period record land grants and temple endowments made to Jain monks and communities. The Many historians opinion that Rashtrakutas Deeply influenced by Jainism but also worshiped Hindu gods and goddesses; although some of them are regarded as celestial demi-Gods by Jains as well.

== Notes ==
Preceded by Indra II	Rashtrakuta Emperor; 735–756	Succeeded by Krishna I
