= Govinda III =

Rashtrakuta emperor from 793 to 814

- Prabhutavarsha; Jagattunga, Anupama, Kirthinarayana, Prithvivallabha, Shrivallabha, Vimaladitya, Atishayadhavala, Tribhuvanadhavala
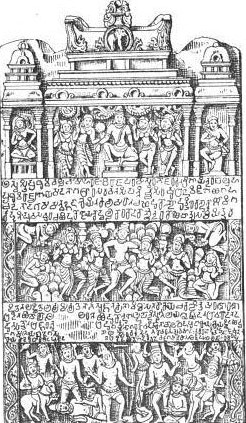
- Old Kannada inscription (800 CE) of Rashtrakuta Emperor Govinda III at Veerabhadra temple at Mavali.

Rashtrakuta Emperor
- Reign: c. 793 – c. 814
- Predecessor: Dhruva Dharavarsha
- Successor: Amoghavarsha I
- Died: 814
- Consort: Gamundabbe
- Issue: Amoghavarsha I
- Father: Dhruva Dharavarsha
- Mother: Sila Mahadevi, daughter of Vishnuvardhana IV
- Religion: Jainism

Govinda III (died 814) was the Rashtrakuta monarch who succeeded his father Dhruva Dharavarsha. He was militarily the most successful emperor of the dynasty with successful conquests from Kanyakumari in the south to Kanyakubja in the north, from Banaras in the east to Bharuch in the west. From the Someshvara inscription of 804, it is known that 'Gamundabbe' was his chief queen. During his reign, the Rashtrakuta dynasty expanded its territory and strengthened its political influence.

== Early life ==
=== War of Succession ===
Though Govinda III became the emperor it was not before having to face some internal family feuds. Govinda III ascended the throne in 793 CE and as was expected, his accession did not go unchallenged. For a time his elder brother Stambha kept quiet, but when he was assured of the support of a number of feudatories and neighbours, he broke out in open revolt against his brother. Govinda, however, quelled the rebellion of “twelve kings headed by Stambha” and took his brother prisoner. Govinda, however, treated him leniently and, being convinced of his loyalty in future, Govinda took the magnanimous step of reinstating him to the Ganga viceroyalty. Throughout the rest of his life, Stambha remained loyal to his plighted word, ending the war of succession.

== Religion ==
Govinda III is known for his policy of religious tolerance and support for multiple faiths within his empire. Inscriptions from his reign invoke royal titles such as "Prithvivallabha," "Shrivallabha," "Vimaladitya," and "Atishayadhavala"—epithets that are common in Jain royal usage and also appear frequently in Jain donor and ruler inscriptions. This reflects the Rashtrakuta dynasty’s well-established tradition of supporting both Hinduism and Jainism. Numerous grants to Jain monks and temples continued during the Rashtrakutas’ rule.

During the rule of Govinda III, and with his support Jain monks like acharya Virasena and acharya Jinasena composed important Jain texts, including the famous "Dhavala" (a commentary on the "Shatakhandagama"). Work on the "Jayadhavala" was also begun under them and later completed by their disciples.

== Military career ==
According to the Nesarika inscription, some kingdoms came under the influence of Govinda III without any conflict or war with them. The lines read as follows:

Nesarika inscription of Govinda III
Transliteration

Pandya-dēś-ādhipān matsyam vrishabham Pallavēśvarā[t] [*]

(Chô)lād vyāghram gajam Gangach chapa-yashțim cha Kerala[t] [*]

Amdhra-Chalukya-Mauryēbhyo vārāham Gürya(rja)rēśvarā[t] [*]

t(pha)lakam (prā)tipa[d*]-dhāryam vrishabham Pallavēśvarā[t] [*]

(Kō)sal-Avanti-nāthā(bhyām) Simhalad api nama[kam] [*]

Tārā(m) bhagava(tim) khyātām Dharmād Vangala-bhūmipat [*]

— The Nesarika inscription of Govinda III, Verses 21-23

English Translation by D. C. Sircar

The fish from the Pandya king;
the bull from the Pallava king;
the tiger from the Chola king;
the elephant from the [Western] Ganga king;
the bow from the Kerala king;
the boar from the Andhra (Eastern Chalukya), Chalukya and Maurya kings;
phalaka or board bearing [the figures of] the pratipad or kettle-drum and the harya or snake from the Gürjara king;
the bull from the Pallava king
the namaka (i.e. the names of the individual rulers) from the Kösala, Avanti and Simhala kings; and
the celebrated goddes Tără from Dharma, the king of Vangala.

— The Nesarika inscription of Govinda III, Verses 21-23

=== Conquest of Northern and Eastern India ===
==== Capture of Kannauj ====
From his capital Mayurakhandi in present-day Bidar district, Govinda III conducted his northern campaign in 800 CE. He successfully obtained the submission of Gurjara-Pratihara emperor Nagabhata II, Pala emperor Dharmapala and the incumbent puppet ruler of Kanyakubja, Chakrayudha.

The Sanjan plates of Govinda III mention that the horse of Govinda III drank the icy liquid bubbling in the Himalayan stream and his war elephants tasted the holy waters of the Ganges. The rulers of Magadha and Bengal also submitted to him. An inscription of 813 CE states the Govinda III conquered Lata (southern and central Gujarat) and made his brother Indra the ruler of the territory. This in effect became a branch of the Rashtrakuta Empire. After the conquest of Malwa, Govinda III ensured the Paramara dynasty would rule as vassals of the Rashtrakutas in 800 CE.

However, Govinda III had control over the regions between Vindhyas and Malwa in the north to Kanchi in the south, while the heart of his empire extended from the Narmada to Tungabhadra rivers.

==== Southern campaign ====
He obtained the submission of the King of Ceylon (Sri Lanka) without even going to battle. The King of Ceylon is said to have sent him two statues, one of himself and another of his minister as an act of submission. The Nasari record states that now all the kingdoms of the Tamil country, the Cholas, Pandyas and the Keralas paid their tribute to Govinda III.

Never had the Rashtrakuta Empire reach such levels of military success and zenith of glory. Govinda III died in 814. His brother Indra during this time founded the Gujarat (Lata) branch. Govinda III was succeeded by his son Amoghavarsha I.

== Inscriptions ==
Nesarika grant of Govinda III
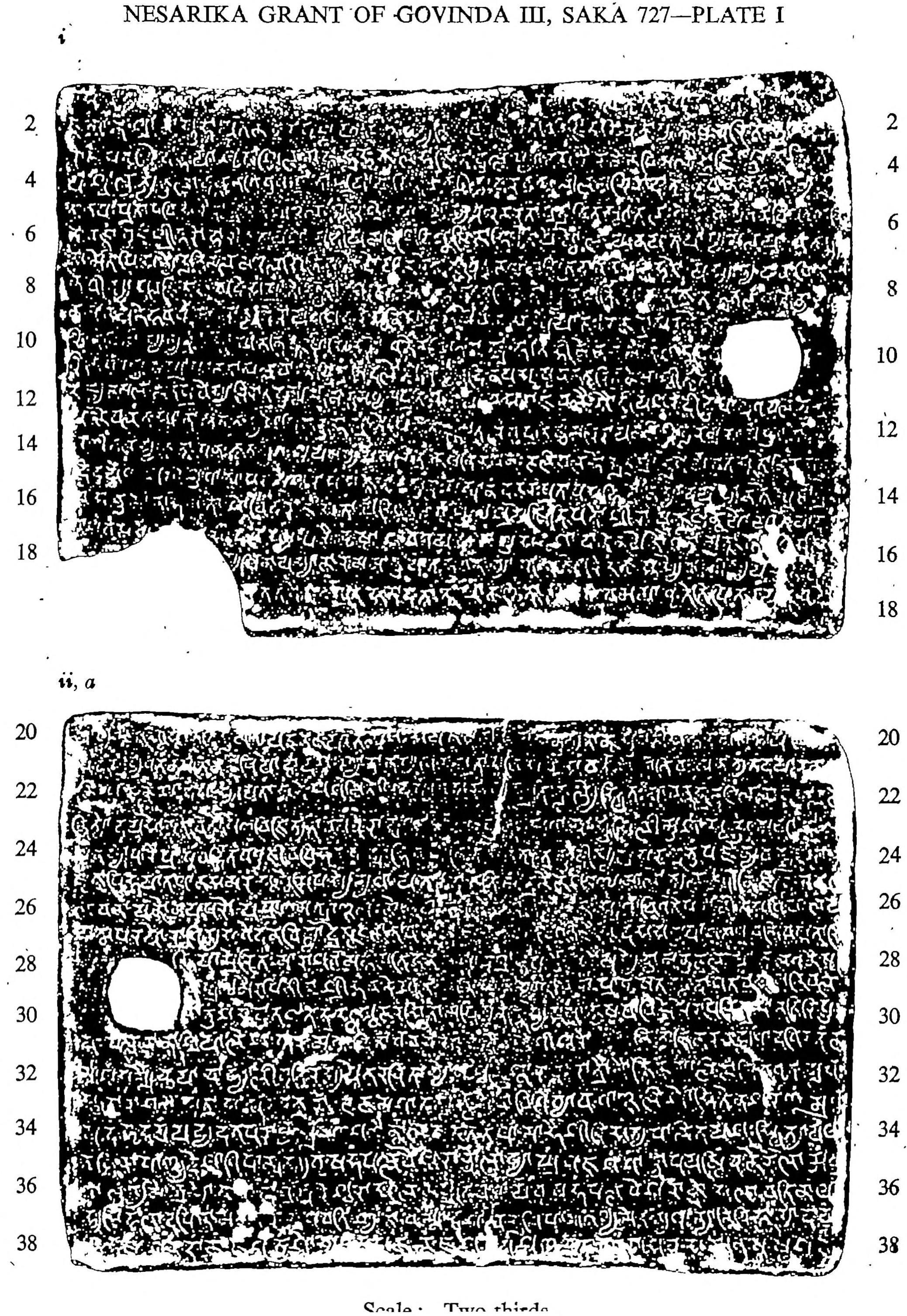
Plate I

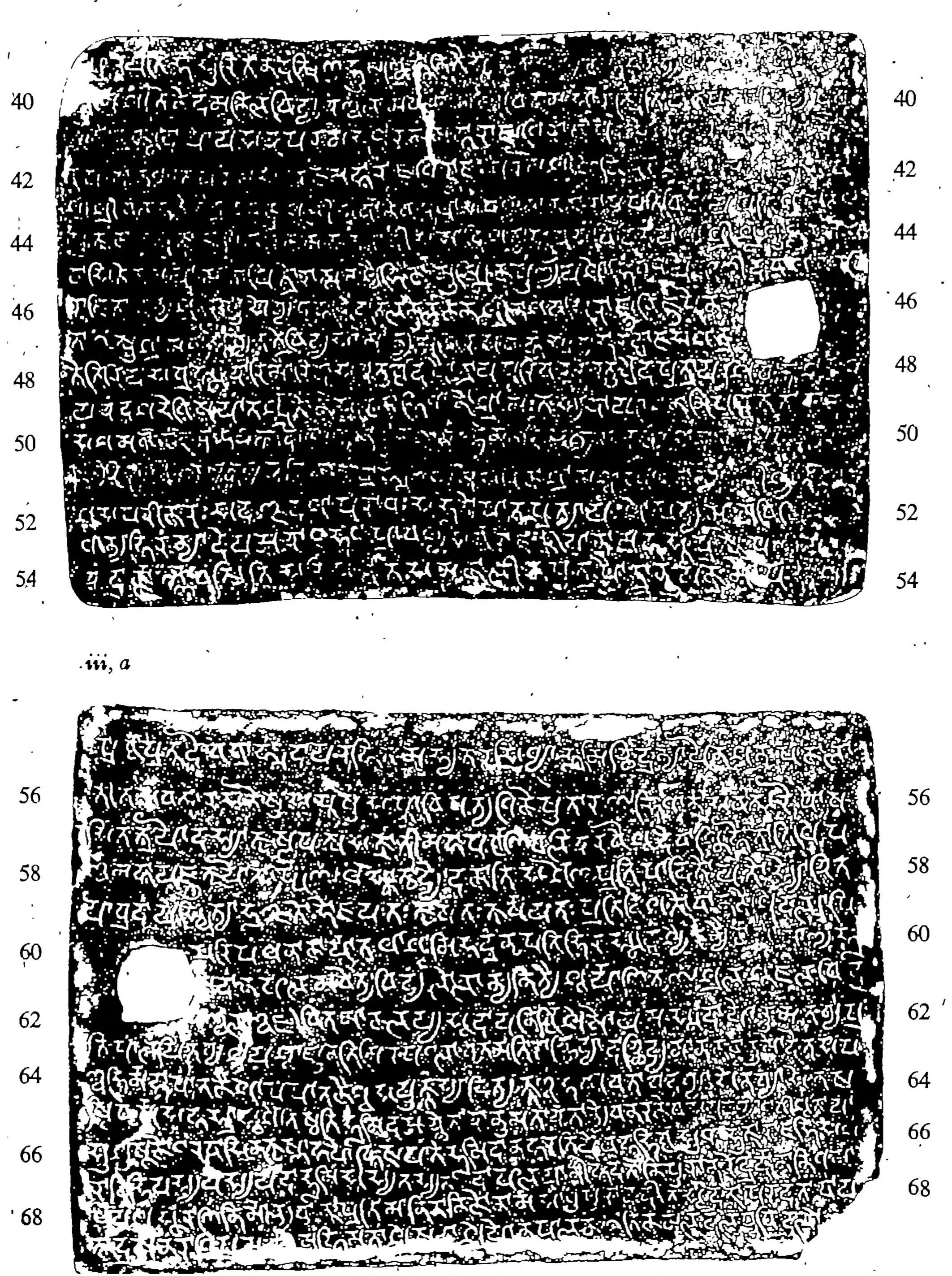
Plate II

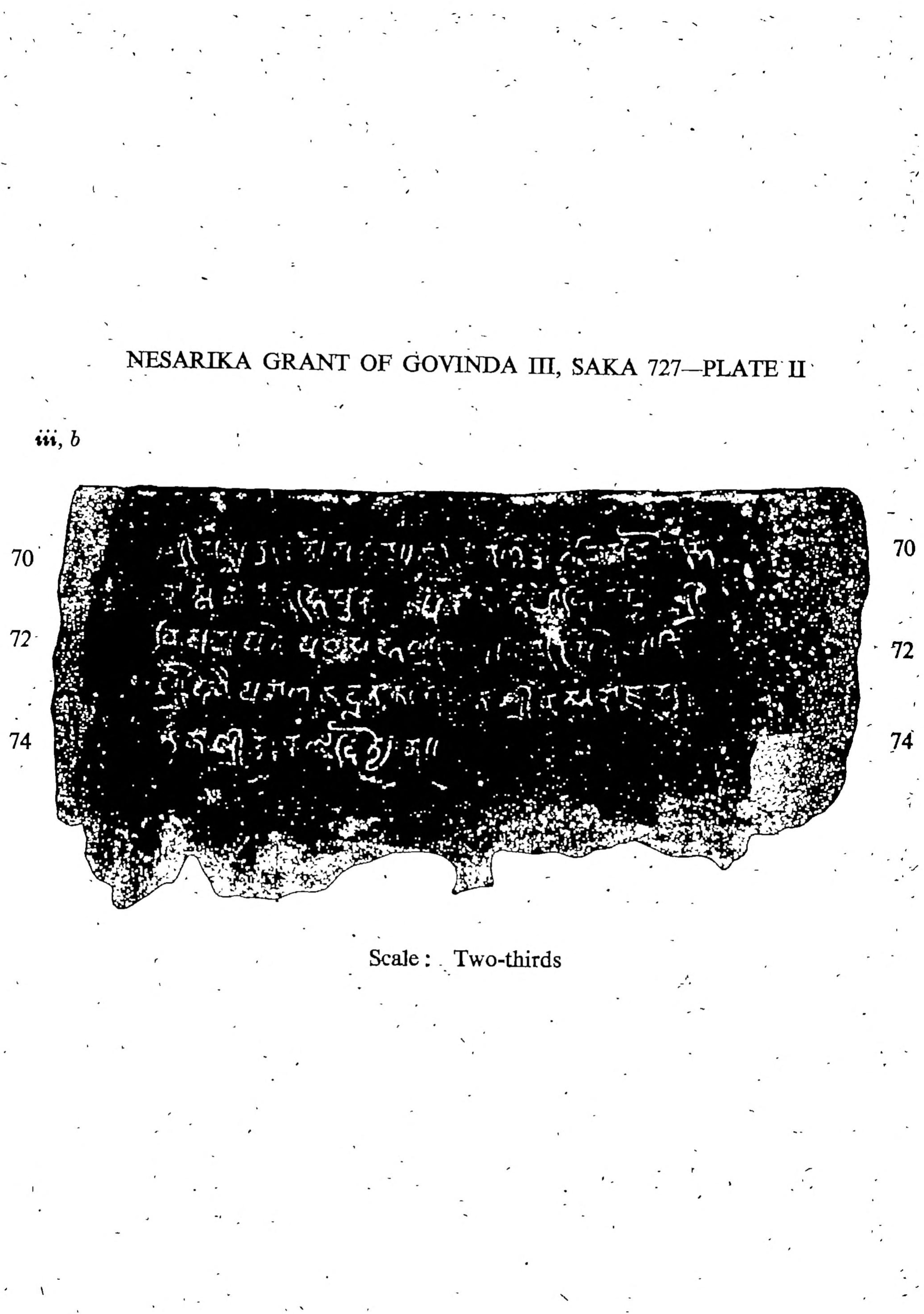
Plate III

== See also ==
- Kannauj
- Amoghavarsha
- Rashtrakuta Empire
- Tripartite Struggle
- Branches of Rashtrakuta dynasty

== Notes ==
| Preceded by Dhruva Dharavarsha | Rashtrakuta Emperor; 793–814 | Succeeded by Amoghavarsha |
