= List of state leaders who died by suicide =

A number of heads of state and heads of government have died as a result of suicide, either while in office or after leaving office. National leaders who die by suicide while in office generally do so because their leadership is under threat – for instance, by a coup or an invading army. Some have done so under compulsion.

== Heads of state ==
Name	State	Year	In office?	Method	(Probable) motive	Ref.
Zhou	Shang dynasty	1046 BC	Yes	Immolation	Impending defeat by rebels under Jiang Ziya	
Zimri	Israel	885 BC?	Yes	Immolation	Impending defeat by rebels under Omri	
Rusa I	Urartu	714 BC	Yes	Stabbing	Defeat by Sargon II, looting of Musasir	
Midas	Phrygia	676 BC?	Yes	Poisoning	Impending defeat by the Cimmerians	
Šamaš-šuma-ukin (disputed)	Babylonia	648 BC	Yes	Immolation	Defeat by Ashurbanipal	
Cheng	Chu	626 BC	Yes	Hanging	Palace coup by Prince Shangchen	
Sîn-šar-iškun (disputed)	Assyria	612 BC	Yes		Defeat by Nabopolassar	
Ling	Chu	529 BC	Yes	Hanging	Palace coup by Duke Qiji of Cai	
Psamtik III	Egypt	525 BC	No	Poisoning	Defeated and deposed by the Achaemenid king Cambyses II	
Cleomenes I (disputed)	Sparta	490 BC	Yes	Mutilation by sword	Imprisonment on grounds of insanity	
Fuchai	Wu	473 BC	Yes	Hanging or slitting throat (disputed)	Defeat by Goujian of Yue	
Chetaka	Licchavi Republic	468 BC	Yes	Drowning	Defeat by Ajatashatru of Magadha	
Huai	Qin	425 BC	Yes		Compelled after palace coup	
Chandragupta Maurya (disputed)	Maurya Empire	295 BC	No	Starvation (sallekhana)	Piety	
Cleomenes III	Sparta	219 BC	No		Failure of revolt against Ptolemy IV	
Qin Er Shi	Qin dynasty	207 BC	Yes		Compelled after palace coup by Zhao Gao	
Xiang Yu	Chu	202 BC	Yes	Slitting throat	Defeat by Liu Bang at the Battle of Gaixia	
An Dương Vương	Âu Lạc	179 BC	Yes	Drowning	Defeat by Zhao Tuo	
Quintus Fulvius Flaccus	Roman Republic	172 BC	No	Hanging	Depression after death of son	
Diaeus	Achaean League	146 BC	Yes	Poisoning	Defeat by Romans under Lucius Mummius	
Diodotus Tryphon (disputed)	Seleucid Empire	138 BC	Yes		Defeat by Antiochus VII Sidetes	
Gaius Papirius Carbo	Roman Republic	119 BC	No	Poisoning	Prosecution for treason	
Gnaeus Papirius Carbo	Roman Republic	112 BC	No	Poisoning	Prosecution for losing the Battle of Noreia	
Gaius Marius the Younger	Roman Republic	82 BC	Yes		Defeat at the Battle of the Colline Gate and impending capture by Sulla	
Gaius Norbanus	Roman Republic	82 BC	No		Threat of extradition from Rhodes after proscription by Sulla	
Mithridates VI Eupator	Pontus	63 BC	Yes	Stabbed by bodyguard on command after failed poisoning	Impending defeat by rebellion	
Ptolemy of Cyprus	Cyprus	58 BC	Yes	Poisoning	Threat of Roman annexation	
Juba I	Numidia	46 BC	Yes	Duel as part of suicide pact with Marcus Petreius	Impending defeat by Julius Caesar after the Battle of Thapsus	
Mark Antony	Roman Republic	30 BC	No	Stabbing	Defeat by Octavian at the Battle of Alexandria	
Cleopatra VII Philopator	Ptolemaic Kingdom	30 BC	Yes	Poisoning	Death of Mark Antony and defeat by Octavian	
Nero	Roman Empire	68	Yes	Stabbing (assisted by Epaphroditus)	Impending overthrow	
Otho	Roman Empire	69	Yes	Stabbing	Impending defeat by Vitellius	
Decebalus	Dacia	106	Yes	Slitting throat	Defeat by Trajan	
Uthiyan Cheralathan	Chera dynasty	130?	Yes	Starvation (vaṭakkiruttal)	Defeat by Karikala at the Battle of Venni	
Gordian I	Roman Empire	238	Yes	Hanging	Death of son and co-emperor Gordian II at the Battle of Carthage	
Sun Liang	Eastern Wu	260	No		Accused of plotting to assassinate successor after deposition	
Bongsang	Goguryeo	300	Yes	Hanging	Palace coup owing to popular unrest	
Maximian	Roman Empire	310	No	Hanging	Failure of rebellion against Constantine I	
Diocletian (disputed)	Roman Empire	312?	No	Starvation	Fear of reprisal by Constantine I	
Li Qi	Cheng Han	338	No	Hanging	Palace coup and deposition by Li Shou	
Lü Shao	Later Liang	400	Yes		Palace coup by Lü Zuan	
Juqu Mujian	Northern Liang	447	No		Compelled by Taiwu of Northern Wei on suspicion of plotting rebellion	
Yujiulü Anagui	Rouran Khaganate	552	Yes		Defeat by Turkic rebellion led by Bumin Qaghan	
Gao Wei	Northern Qi	577?	No		Compelled by Wu of Northern Zhou on suspicion of plotting rebellion	
Kōbun	Japan	672	Yes	Strangulation	Defeat by Prince Ōama in Jinshin War	
Huigang	Silla	838	Yes	Hanging	Impending defeat by rebels under Kim Myeong	
Zhangxin Qaghan	Uyghur Khaganate	839	Yes		Defeat by Zhuyue Chixin	
Zhu Yougui	Later Liang	913	Yes		Palace coup by Zhu Youzhen	
Zhu Youzhen	Later Liang	923	Yes		Impending defeat by Later Tang	
Gyeongae	Silla	927	Yes		Compelled after defeat by Kyŏn Hwŏn	
Li Congke	Later Tang	937	Yes	Immolation	Impending defeat by Taizong of Liao	
Marasimha II	Western Ganga dynasty	975	No	Starvation (sallekhana)	Failure against Siyaka and Tailapa II, piety	
Indra IV	Rashtrakuta	982	No	Starvation (sallekhana)	Collapse of Rashtrakuta, failure against Tailapa II, piety	
Jayapala	Hindu Shahis	1001	No	Immolation	Defeat by Mahmud of Ghazni and abdication	
Someshvara I	Western Chalukya Empire	1068	Yes	Drowning	Defeat by Virarajendra Chola and illness	
Ananta	Lohara dynasty	1081	No	Stabbing	Breakdown of relationship with son and successor Kalaśa after abdication	
Zhang Bangchang	Da Chu	1127	No	Hanging	Compelled by Gaozong of Song after abdication	
Aizong	Jin dynasty	1234	Yes	Hanging	Mongol conquest of the Jin dynasty	
Prataparudra	Kakatiya dynasty	1323	Yes		Defeat and capture by the Delhi Sultanate	
Bayezid I	Ottoman Empire	1403	No		Defeat and imprisonment by Timur	
Tezozomoctli	Cuauhtitlan	1430	Yes	Poisoning	Defeat in the Tepanec War	
Hasan Ali	Qara Qoyunlu	1469	Yes		Defeat by Uzun Hasan	
Moquihuix (disputed)	Tlatelolco	1473	Yes	Jumped off pyramid	Defeat by Aztecs in the Battle of Tlatelolco	
Lê Cung Hoàng	Lê dynasty	1527	No	Hanging	Compelled after palace coup by Mạc Đăng Dung	
Muzaffar Shah III	Gujarat	1592	No	Slitting throat	Capture by Mughal forces after failed rebellion	
Chongzhen Emperor	Ming dynasty	1644	Yes	Hanging or suffocation (disputed)	Impending defeat by rebels under Li Zicheng	
Lê Duy Phường	Lê dynasty	1735	No	Hanging	Compelled after palace coup by Trịnh Giang	
Jérôme Pétion de Villeneuve	France	1794	No	Gunshot	Impending arrest after proscription	
Philippe Rühl	France	1795	No	Stabbing	Prosecution after failure of Prairial uprising	
Louis-Joseph Charlier	France	1797	No	Gunshot	Mental breakdown	
Osei Kwame Panyin	Ashanti Empire	1803	No	Poisoning or strangulation (disputed)	Deposition by Konadu Yaadom	
Henri Christophe	Haiti	1820	Yes	Gunshot	Poor health, impending overthrow	
Juan Larrea	Argentina	1847	No	Gunshot or slitting throat (disputed)	Business failure	
Anson Jones	Texas	1858	No	Gunshot	Political failure	
Talal bin Abdullah Al Rashid	Jabal Shammar	1868	Yes	Gunshot	Ill-health	
Tewodros II	Ethiopia	1868	Yes	Gunshot	Defeated by the British Expedition to Abyssinia	
Abdulaziz (disputed)	Ottoman Empire	1876	No	Arms cut by scissors	Forced abdication	
Fridolin Anderwert	Switzerland	1880	Yes	Gunshot	Adverse press coverage, depression, exhaustion	
José Manuel Balmaceda	Chile	1891	No	Gunshot	Defeat in the Chilean Civil War of 1891	
Nikolay Chkheidze	Georgia	1926	No	Slitting throat	Depression over the Bolsheviks' conquest of Georgia	
Germán Busch	Bolivia	1939	Yes	Gunshot	Political frustration, depression	
Otto Strandman	Estonia	1941	No	Gunshot	Impending arrest by NKVD	
Bolesław Wieniawa-Długoszowski	Poland	1942	No	Jumped off a building	Defeat of Poland and political frustration in exile	
Adolf Hitler	Germany	1945	Yes	Gunshot	Pending defeat in the European theatre of World War II	
Nguyen Van Thinh	Cochinchina	1946	Yes	Hanging	Political failure	
Omer Nishani (disputed)	Albania	1954	No	Gunshot	Poor health, political failure	
Getúlio Vargas	Brazil	1954	Yes	Gunshot	Opposition from the military	
Salvador Allende	Chile	1973	Yes	Gunshot	Military coup	
Chivu Stoica	Romania	1975	No	Gunshot	Out of favour with leadership of the Romanian Communist Party	
Carlos Prío Socarrás (disputed)	Cuba	1977	No	Gunshot	Faced questioning by the House Select Committee on Assassinations	
Antonio Guzmán Fernández	Dominican Republic	1982	Yes	Gunshot	Corruption allegations	
Osvaldo Dorticós Torrado	Cuba	1983	No	Gunshot	Poor health, bereavement	
Lazarus Salii	Palau	1988	Yes	Gunshot	Corruption allegations	
Zviad Gamsakhurdia (disputed)	Georgia	1993	No	Gunshot	Defeat in the Georgian Civil War	
Dipendra	Nepal	2001	Yes	Gunshot	Unknown: had just killed nine family members	
Carlos Roberto Reina	Honduras	2003	No	Gunshot	Ill-health	
Milan Babić	Serbian Krajina	2006	No	Hanging	Imprisonment over war crimes	
Roh Moo-hyun	South Korea	2009	No	Jumped off a cliff	Corruption allegations	
Alan García Pérez	Peru	2019	No	Gunshot	Allegations of corruption	
Abu Bakr al-Baghdadi	Islamic State	2019	Yes	Suicide bombing	Avoiding capture during the Barisha raid	

== Heads of government ==
Name	Country	Year	In office	Method	Probable motive	Reference
Hurshid Pasha	Ottoman Empire	1822	Yes	Poison	Defeat in the Greek War of Independence and execution threat	
Bhimsen Thapa	Nepal	1839	No	Slit throat with a kukri	Disgrace of third wife	
Abdul Muhsin al-Sa'dun	Iraq	1929	Yes	Gunshot	Political frustration	
Iosif Adamovich	Byelorussian SSR	1937	No	Gunshot	Being taken to Moscow under arrest	
Walery Sławek	Poland	1939	No	Gunshot	Political failure	
Pál Teleki	Hungary	1941	Yes	Gunshot	Distress over entry of German troops into Hungary	
Alexandros Koryzis	Greece	1941	Yes	Gunshot	German invasion of Greece	
Joseph Goebbels	Germany	1945	No	Gunshot or cyanide	Defeat in European theatre of World War II	
Fumimaro Konoe	Japan	1945	No	Cyanide	Accused of war crimes	
Milan Nedić (disputed)	Serbia	1946	No	Jumped from prison window	Imprisonment after defeat in World War II	
Johannes Vares (disputed)	Estonia	1946	No	Gunshot	Disillusion with Soviet system	
Tawfik Abu Al-Huda	Jordan	1956	No	Hanging	Dying of cancer	
John McEwen	Australia	1980	No	Starvation (refused food)	Ill-health	
Mehmet Shehu (disputed)	Albania	1981	Yes	Gunshot	Nervous breakdown	
Hailu Yimenu	Ethiopia	1991 or 1993	No	Hanging	Avoiding capture by the EPRDF	
Pierre Bérégovoy	France	1993	No	Gunshot	Depression and being investigated	
Mahmoud Zuabi	Syria	2000	No	Gunshot	Allegations of corruption	
Ruud Lubbers	Netherlands	2019	No	Assisted suicide	Poor health	
Alan García Pérez	Peru	2019	No	Gunshot	Allegations of corruption	
Dries van Agt	Netherlands	2024	No	Assisted suicide	Poor health	

== See also ==
- List of assassinated and executed heads of state and government
- List of heads of state and government who were sentenced to death
