= Marasimha II Satyavakya =

Western Ganga king from 963 to 975

- Maharaja; Nolambantaka; Guttiya-Ganga

23rd Western Ganga king
- Reign: 963–975
- Predecessor: Marulaganga Neetimarga (961–963)
- Successor: Rachamalla IV Satyavakya (975–986)
- Spouse: Abbarasi
- Issue: Rachamalla IV Satyavakya, Rachamalla V
- House: Western Ganga
- Father: Butuga II
- Mother: Kallabbarasi (daughter of the Chalukya king Simhavarman)
- Religion: Jainism

Marasimha II Satyavakya was a king of the Western Ganga Dynasty, 23rd in the succession. He was the successor of Marulaganga Neetimarga, his half-brother who reigned 961–963. He was succeeded by Rachamalla IV Satyavakya, his eldest son. He was a vassal of the declining Rashtrakuta empire and served them until their collapse.

His reign is considered as a prelude to the decline and fall of the Ganga Kingdom. His two sons- Rachmalla IV and Rachmalla V (Rakkasaganga) were the last kings of the Western Ganga Dynasty.

== Reign ==
Marasimha II was the second son of Butuga II through his second wife Kallabbarasi. He was a loyal feudatory of the Rashtrakutas and served them till their demise. He was serving them from the reign of Krishna III, the last great Rashtrakuta monarch. He led a campaign into the north for his overlord Krishna III, where he defeated a Gurjara-Pratihara king named Lalla.

He subsequently served Rashtrakuta kings Khottiga and Karka II as governor of multiple southern Rashtrakuta provinces. He defeated Nanni Nolamba, ruler of the Pallavas of Nolambavadi and assumed the title of "Nolambantaka" (ender of the family of Nolambas). Chamundaraya was his loyal and able prime minister, who helped him conquer several territories.

When his Rashtrakuta overlord Karka II was killed by his rebellious feudatory Tailapa II, Marasimha II tried to continue the Rashtrakuta Empire by crowning Indra IV as emperor at Bankapur in 973.

One of his discovered inscription includes the Shravanbelgola epitaph of Marasimha II.

== Death ==
He starved himself to death by the Jain ritual of Sallekhana at Bankapur, in 975. The death of Marasimha is considered as a prelude to the decline and fall of the Ganga Kingdom.

His death sparked a civil war in the Western Ganga Kingdom, and his former prime minister Chavundaraya helped Marasimha's eldest son Rachamalla ascend the throne, and Rachamalla came to the throne as Rachamalla IV Satyvakya.

== Bibliography ==
- Reu, Pandit Bisheshwar Nath (1997) [1933]. History of The Rashtrakutas (Rathodas). Jaipur: Publication scheme. ISBN 81-86782-12-5.
- Kamath, Suryanath U. (2001) [1980]. A concise history of Karnataka : from pre-historic times to the present. Bangalore: Jupiter books. LCCN 80905179. OCLC 7796041.

Preceded by Marulaganga Neetimarga (961–963)	Western Ganga king (963–975)	Succeeded by Rachamalla IV Satyavakya (975–986)
