= Krishna III =

Rashtrakuta Emperor from 939 to 967

- Maharajadhiraja; Vallabhanarendra; Paramabhattaraka; Akalavarsha; Shri-prithvi-vallabha

12th Rashtrakuta Emperor
- Reign: December 939 – December 967
- Predecessor: Amoghavarsha III
- Successor: Khottiga
- Born: Kannaradeva
- Spouse: Unnamed princess of Chedi
- Issue: Unnamed son Bijjabbe
- Dynasty: Rashtrakuta
- Father: Amoghavarsha III
- Religion: Jainism

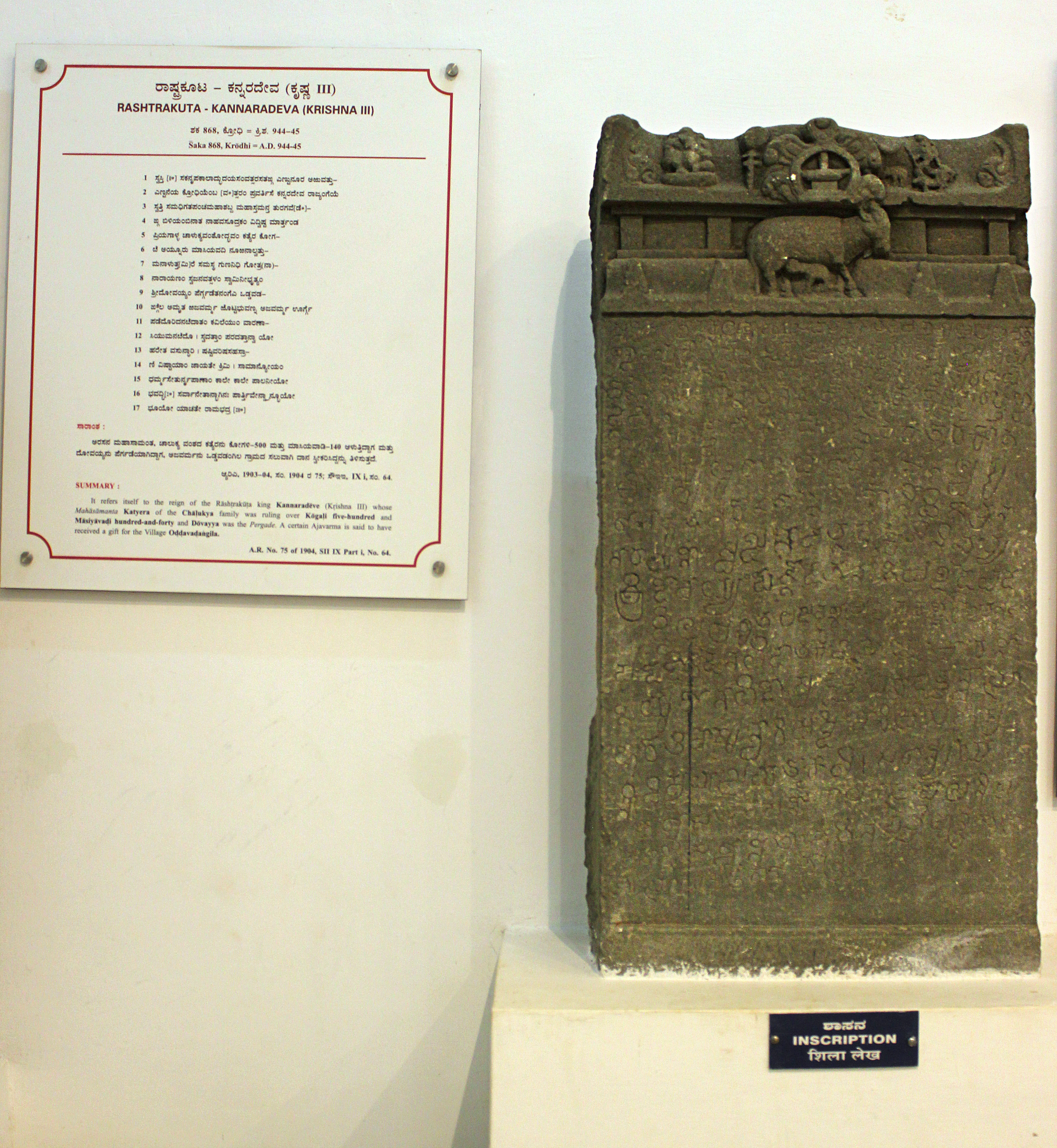
Old Kannada inscription dated c. 944–45 of Rashtrakuta Emperor Krishna III

Krishna III (r. 939 – 967), was the last great warrior and able Rashtrakuta Emperor. He was a shrewd administrator and skillful military campaigner. He waged many wars to restore the glory of the Rashtrakutas and played an important role in rebuilding the Rashtrakuta empire. He patronised the famous Kannada poets Ponna, who wrote "Shantinatha Purana" and Gajankusha, who wrote on erotics, and the Apabhramsha poet Pushpadanta who wrote "Mahapurana" and other works. His queen was a Chedi princess and his daughter Bijjabbe was married to a Western Ganga prince. During his rule he held titles such as Akalavarsha, Maharajadhiraja, Parameshvara, Paramamaheshvara, Shri Prithvivallabha etc. At his peak, he reigned over a vast empire stretching from at least the Narmada river in the north to at least the Kaveri river delta in the south. A copper grant of 993 issued by the Shilahara king of Thana states that the Rashtrakuta control extended from the Himalayas in the north to Ceylon in the south and from the eastern sea to the western seas. This grant also states that when the emperor Krishna III mobilised his armies, the kings of Chola, Bengal, Kannauj, Andhra and Pandya regions used to quiver.

== Southern conquests ==
He slew the Western Ganga ruler Rachamalla II and made his brother-in-law Butuga II the king of the Gangavadi territory. He fought the Gurjara Prathihara and captured Chitrakuta and Kalinjara regions. He defeated his family relations, the Kalachuris of Tripuri (Chedi) when they had turned against the Rashtrakutas. Later he invaded the southern Deccan and recaptured Kolar and Dharmapuri from the Banas and Vaidumbas who had given shelter to Govinda IV due to his matrimonial relations with the Cholas. Though he initially may have experienced setbacks, Tondaimandalam was secured by 944. He defeated the Cholas and captured Kanchi and Tanjore, according to the Siddalingamadam plates of 944.

In c. 949, he defeated the Cholas decisively in a Battle of Takkolam in present-day North Arcot district. Krishna III was joined by his Western Ganga feudatory Butuga II in this campaign. Chola prince Rajaditya Chola was killed "while seated on his elephant with a well-aimed arrow". From the famous Atakur inscription it is known that Krishna III gave Buthuga II extensive Ratta territories near Banavasi in return for this victory. With the fall of the Cholas, he extracted tribute from the Pandyas and the Chera ruler of Kerala. He also obtained the submission of the King of Ceylon, extracted tributes from the Manadlika rulers, and erected a pillar of victory at Ramesvaram. This victory is narrated in Somadeva's writing Yashatilaka Champu of 959 as well.

However, from location of the inscriptions it is argued that Krishna III had full control only of Tondaimandalam (northern Tamil Nadu) as his inscriptions are not found further south in modern Tamil Nadu. After these victories he proclaimed himself "Conqueror of Kacci and Tanjai" (Kanchi and Tanjore). He exerted influence on Vengi (modern Andhra Pradesh) by helping Badapa secure the throne against his competitor Amma II. Later, Danarnava of Vengi became his feudatory.

== Northern conquests ==
While Krishna III focussed on southern Deccan, the Chandelas had captured Chitrakuta and Kalinjar. This prompted Krishna III to send his Western Ganga vassal Marasimha II, son of Butuga II, to retrieve the lost areas. Marasimha defeated the Gurjara Prathiharas. The northernmost Kannada inscription of the Rashtrakutas, dated about 964 is the Jura record (near Jabalpur) in present-day Madhya Pradesh. The details of these victories are inscribed in this inscription. Two inscriptions of Marasimha, dated 965 and 968, state that his forces destroyed Ujjayani (which lies in the Paramara territory of Malwa). Based on this, some historians such as A. S. Altekar conclude that the Paramara king Siyaka must have rebelled against the Rashtrakuta suzerainty, resulting in a military campaign against him. Thus, Marasimha must have also defeated the Paramaras. However, K. N. Sethi believes that Krishna III only targeted the Gurjara-Pratiharas: there is no evidence to show that Siyaka rebelled against Krishna III or faced a battle against his forces.

At his peak, Krishna III ruled an empire that extended at least from the Narmada river in the north and stretched south covering large parts of present-day northern Tamil Nadu in the south. The Prathihara, the Paramara, the Seuna (ruled by Vaddiga) and the northern Kalachuris were his feudatories in the northern Deccan and central India.

This enmity with the northern Kalachuris of Tripuri proved fatal to the empire towards the end of his rule. Krishna III was also perhaps reckless in giving large fiefs (land grants) to his commanders. He gave the province of Tardavadi (present day Vijayapura district) sometime before 965 to Tailapa II his Chalukya feudatory right in the heart of his empire. This later turned out to be to the Rashtrakutas' undoing.

== Religion ==
Krishna III is described as Jain by faith according to historian P.B. Desai. Their inscriptions begin by specifying the temple or religious institution to which the grant or donation is being made, rather than invoking a single deity. Krishna III continued the Rashtrakuta dynasty’s longstanding and well-documented tradition of strong Jain patronage. Under the patronage of Krishna III, Kannada Jain Poet Ponna composed works such as "Shantinatha Purana", "Jinaksharamale", and "Bhuvanaika-Ramabhyudaya". Known for his Jain texts and command over both Kannada and Sanskrit, Ponna was honoured by Krishna III with the title "Ubhaya-Kavi-Chakravarti" (Emperor among poets) in recognition of his rich poetic imagery and mastery of literary style. And Numerous inscriptions and land grants from Rashtrakuta rulers show sustained support for Jain monks, temples, and scholars across the Deccan, a policy begun by earlier kings like Amoghavarsha I. Krishna III maintained this inclusive approach, encouraging Jain religious institutions within his empire.

== Notes ==
| Preceded by Amoghavarsha III | King of the Rashtrakuta dynasty 939–967 | Succeeded by Khottiga Amoghavarsha |
