= Bhillama =

Bhillama may refer to any of the following rulers of the Seuna (Yadava) dynasty of India:

- Bhillama I (r. c. 910–930 CE)
- Bhillama II (r. c. 985–1005 CE)
- Bhillama III (r.c. 1025–1045 CE)
- Bhillama IV (r.c. ?–1065 CE)
- Bhillama V (r. c. 1175–1191 CE)
- Bhillama VI (r.c 13th century CE)
