= Indra IV =

Rashtrakuta emperor from 973 to 982

- Elevabedanga; Ratta-Kandarpa-Deva; Rajamartanda; Chaladankakara; Kirthi-Narayana

Rashtrakuta Emperor
- Reign: 973 – 20 March 982
- Coronation: 973; Bankapura, Rashtrakuta Empire
- Predecessor: Karka II
- Successor: Position abolished
- Died: 20 March 982; Shravanabelagola, Rashtrakuta Empire
- Religion: Jainism

Indra IV (died 20 March 982) was the last Rashtrakuta Emperor from 973 until his death. He was a nephew of the feudatory king of Western Ganga Dynasty of Talakad. After Tailapa II captured Manyakheta, the Ganga Maharaja Marasimha II crowned Indra III as emperor in Bankapura and worked hard to keep the dwindling Rashtrakuta Empire intact after the betrayal and invasion of Parmaras of Malwa but in vain. Marasimha II committed Sallekhana at Bankapura in 975 and Indra IV followed him in 982 at Shravanabelagola. Thus, the dynasty of Rashtrakutas vanished into history. However, several related families had come to power in various parts of India during the imperial expansion of the Manyakheta Empire. These kingdoms such as the Lattalura and Saundatti branches continued to rule for several centuries.

== See also ==
- Branches of Rashtrakuta Dynasty

Preceded by Karka II	Rashtrakuta Emperor; 973–982	Succeeded by Tailapa II
