= Amoghavarsha III =

Rashtrakuta Emperor from 936 to 939 CE

- Maharajadhiraja; Parameshvara; Shri-prithvi-vallabha

Rashtrakuta Emperor
- Reign: c. 936 – c. 939 CE
- Predecessor: Govinda IV
- Successor: Krishna III
- Consort: Kundaka-Devi
- Issue: Revaka; Krishna III; Khottiga; Nirupama
- Father: Jagattunga
- Religion: Jainism

Amoghavarsha III was a Rashtrakuta emperor, reigning from 936 to 939 CE.

He was the younger brother of Indra III and uncle to Govinda IV. Initially in exile in Tripuri, he asceneded to the imperial throne with the help of feudatory King Arikesari of Vemulavada in Andhra and other vassals who revolted against Govinda IV. Not much is known about his uneventful reign. His advanced age and religious temperament did not allow him to show any interest in the governance of the empire which was left to his son Krishna III. He was married to Kundakadevi, a princess from the Kalachuri dynasty of Tripuri. His daughter Revaka was married to Western Ganga King Butuga II to whom a large territory was given as dowry.

== Notes ==
Preceded by Govinda IV	Rashtrakuta Emperor; 934–939	Succeeded by Krishna III
