= Amoghavarsha II =

Rashtrakuta Emperor from 929 to 930

Rashtrakuta Emperor
- Reign: 929 - 930 CE
- Predecessor: Indra III
- Successor: Govinda IV
- Father: Indra III
- Religion: Jainism; Hinduism

Amoghavarsha II (r. 929–930) was a Rashtrakuta emperor who succeeded his father Indra III upon the latter's death. Amoghavarsha was assassinated by his brother, Govinda IV, who became his successor.

Preceded by Indra III	Rashtrakuta Emperor; 929–930	Succeeded by Govinda IV
