= Bhillama II =

- Mahasamanta; Yadava–narayana; Yati-puravaradhisvara; Visnuvamsodbhava

8th Ruler of Seuna (Yadava) dynasty
- Reign: c. 985–1005 CE
- Predecessor: Dhadiyasa II
- Successor: Vesugi I
- Dynasty: Seuna (Yadava)
- Father: Vaddiga I
- Religion: Jainism

Bhillama II (r. c. 985–1005 CE) was a ruler of the Seuna (Yadava) dynasty of Deccan region in India. He was a vassal of the Kalyani Chalukya ruler Tailapa II, and played an important role in Tailapa's victory against the Paramara king Munja.

== Early life ==
Bhillama was a son and successor of the Yadava chief Dhadiyasa, who was a Rashtrakuta feudatory. He married the Rashtrakuta princess Lakshmi. When the Kalyani Chalukya chief Tailapa II overthrew the Rashtrakutas, Bhillama transferred his allegiance to Chalukyas.

An inscription of the contemporary Shilahara ruler Aparajita states that he granted protection to a king named Bhillama. It is possible that this is a reference to some sort of alliance between Aparajita and Bhillama when they were both Rashtrakuta vassals.

== Military career ==
Bhillama appears to have played an important role in Chalukya-Paramara war, which resulted in the defeat and death of the Paramara king Munja. His 1000 Sangamner inscription poetically boasts that he thrashed the goddess of prosperity Lakshmi on the battlefield because she had sided with Munja, and forced her to become an obedient housewife in the palace of the Chalukya king Tailapa.

The Chalukya king rewarded Bhillama by adding the present-day Ahmednagar area to his hereditary fief. The Sangamner inscription describes Bhillama as a Maha-samanta ("great feudatory"), and mentions his epithets Pancha-maha-shabada, Aratini-sudana, Kandukacharya, Sellavidega, and Vijayabharana.

== Legacy ==
Bhillama erected the Vijayabharneshvara temple at Sangamner. He was succeeded by Vesugi, who married Nayilladevi, the daughter of a Chalukya feudatory of Gujarat.
