= Govinda IV =

Rashtrakuta emperor from 930 to 936

Rashtrakuta emperor
- Reign: 10 May 930 – 936
- Coronation: 10 May 930
- Predecessor: Amoghavarsha II
- Successor: Amoghavarsha III
- Dynasty: Rāshṭrakūṭa
- Father: Indra III
- Religion: Jainism

Govinda IV (reigned 930–936) was the Rashtrakuta emperor from 930 to 936. The younger brother of Amoghavarsha II, Govinda IV became the Rashtrakuta emperor in 930 as described in the Kalasa record of Chikmagalur. He was a very unpopular ruler who indulged in licentious acts. Control over Kannauj was lost during his rule. The Chalukyas of Vengi defeated him and much territory was lost. Finally, his own vassals including King Arikesari of Vemulavada revolted against him and placed Amoghavarsha III on the throne in 935. This is known from the records of Kannada poet Adikavi Pampa, who was patronised by King Arikesari. Govinda IV patronised Kannada poet Ravinagabhatta.

== Name and Attestations ==
A Kannada form of his name, Gojjiga, is attested in contemporary epigraphy. At least two inscriptions and two copper plate grants of Govinda IV have been found. The first inscription, found at Ḍanḍapur in present-day Dharwad district, is dated to 918; the second is dated to 930. The first copper plate grant is dated to 930; and the second, found at Sānglī, is dated to 933.

== Family ==
Govinda was the son of Indra III and the younger brother of Amoghavarsha II.

== Reign ==
Based on inscriptions of the Eastern Chalukya kings Amma I and Bhima III, it seems that there was a war between the Rashtrakutas and Chalukyas during Govinda's reign. One inscription specifies that Bhima had "repulsed" the armies of Govinda, implying that Govinda was the attacker in this conflict.

The Sānglī copper plate grant of 933 says that Govinda "did not wrong his elder brother, nor was he guilty of incest, nor of cruelty". Reu interprets this as meaning that Govinda was accused of these misdeeds during his lifetime, hence why he felt the need to refute these claims in the plate.

== Death ==
According to Reu, Govinda IV appears to have had a short reign and died prematurely.

== Notes ==
Preceded by Amoghavarsha II	Rashtrakuta Emperor; 930–935	Succeeded by Amoghavarsha III
