= Devihosur =

- village
- Location in Karnataka, India Devihosur (India)
- Coordinates: 14.785750°N 75.3335400°E
- Country: India
- State: Karnataka
- District: Haveri
- Talukas: Haveri

Population (2001)
  - Total: 7,946

Languages
  - Official: Kannada
- Time zone: UTC+5:30 (IST)

Devihosur is a village in the southern state of Karnataka, India. It is located in the Haveri taluk of Haveri district in Karnataka.

== Demographics ==
As of 2001 India census, Devihosur had a population of 7946 with 4110 males and 3836 females.

== See also ==
- Haveri
- Districts of Karnataka
