= Tailapa II =

Founder of the Western Chalukya Empire

Tailapa
- Ahavamalla
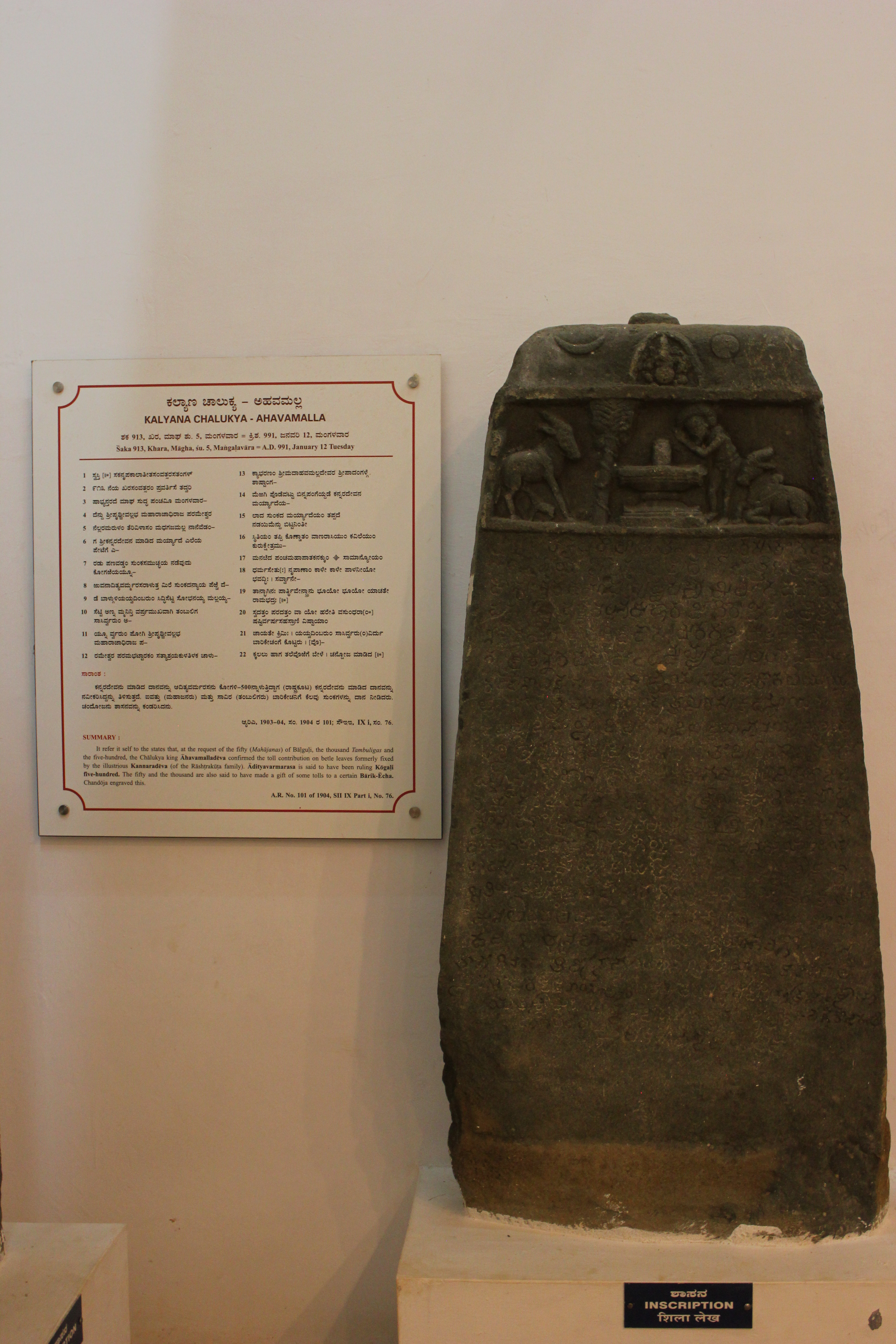
- Old Kannada inscription dated c. 991 of Tailapa II

Founder of Western Chalukya Empire
- Reign: c. 973 – c. 997 (24 years)
- Predecessor: Position established
- Successor: Satyashraya
- Issue: Satyashraya, Dashavarman
- Dynasty: Chalukya

Tailapa II (r. c. 973-997) also known as Taila II and by his title Ahavamalla, was the founder of the Western Chalukya Empire in peninsular India. Tailapa claimed descent from the earlier imperial Chalukyas of Vatapi (Badami), and initially ruled as a Rashtrakuta vassal from the Tardavadi-1000 province in the present-day Vijayapura district of Karnataka. When the Rashtrakuta power declined following an invasion by the Paramara king Siyaka, Tailapa overthrew the Rashtrakuta emperor Karka II, and established a new dynasty.

Tailapa spent several years consolidating his control over the western Deccan region between the Narmada and the Tungabhadra rivers. Gradually, several former Rashtrakuta feudatories, including the Shilaharas, acknowledged his suzerainty. Tailapa successfully resisted Chola and Paramara invasions, and imprisoned and killed the invading Paramara king Munja. His general Barapa captured the Lata region in present-day Gujarat, establishing the Lata Chalukya line of chiefs. Tailapa's successors continued to rule the western Deccan region until the 12th century.

== Ancestry ==
The records of Tailapa's dynasty trace his patrilineal ancestry to the Chalukyas of Vatapi, and also connect him to the Rashtrakutas of Manyakheta and the Kalachuris of Chedi through matrilineal descent. The Chalukya emperor Vijayaditya was succeeded by his son Vikramaditya II: the records of Tailapa's family claim that Vijayaditya had another (unnamed) son, from whom the family descended.

The Chalukya court poet Ranna provides the following genealogy connecting Tailapa to the earlier Chalukya dynasty:

- Vijayaditya II, Chalukya crown prince of Vatapi
- Unnamed prince who was as strong as Bhima I
- Kirtivarman
- Taila I (Tailapa I)
- Bhima II (or Bhimaraja)
- Vikramaditya III
- Ayyana I, who married daughter of Krishna (identified as the Rashtrakuta king Krishna II)
- Vikramaditya IV, who married Bontha Devi, a daughter of the Kalachuri king Lakshmana-raja
- Taila II (Tailapa II)

The 11th century inscriptions of Tailapa's descendants (such as the Kauthem grant) provide a similar genealogy, but they state that Vikramaditya III was the son of Taila I and that Bhima II was the son of Vikramaditya. However, the Vatapi Chalukya records make no mention of Vijayaditya's unnamed son. The differences between the genealogies provided by Ranna and the later inscriptions also cast doubt on the claim that Tailapa's family was connected to the earlier Chalukya royals.

Tailapa's immediate ancestors appear to have been feudatories of the Rashtrakutas, who had displaced the earlier Chalukyas of Vatapi. The marriage of Tailapa's grandfather Ayyana I to a Rashtrakuta princess probably raised the family's political status. A Devihosur inscription of the Rashtrakuta emperor Krishna III (r. 939-967) mentions one Vikramaditya, who can be identified with Tailapa's father Vikramaditya IV.

== Early life ==
Like his father, Tailapa served as a feudatory to the Rashtrakuta emperor Krishna III. He finds a mention in the 957 Karjol inscription and the 965 Narasalagi inscriptions issued during the reign of Krishna. The 957 inscription calls him Tailapayya, and states that he ruled a nadu (administrative unit) as Krishna's subordinate. The 965 inscription calls him Maha-samantadhipati Ahavamalla Tailaparasa of Satyashraya family (Satyashraya-kula-tilaka), and states that Krishna had granted him the fief of Tardavadi-1000.

At this time, he also held the title "Chalukya Rama", and had a subordinate from the Khachara family.

== Rise to power ==
Tailapa's Rashtrakuta overlord Krishna III died around 967, and was succeeded by Khottiga. In 972, the Paramara ruler Siyaka, who had earlier served as a feudatory to the Rashtrakutas in Malwa, invaded and sacked their capital Manyakheta. As a result, the political status of the Rashtrakutas declined greatly. Khottiga died without an heir shortly after Siyaka's raid, and was succeeded by his nephew Karka II. Karka had sidelined Krishna's grandson Indra IV to ascend the throne, thus alienating Indra's maternal uncle Marasimha, who was a powerful Rashtrakuta feudatory from the Ganga family. The records of Tailapa's dynasty suggest that Karka was a weak ruler, and that the vicious nature of two of his principal ministers had led to dissatisfaction among his subjects.

Tailapa used this opportunity to usurp the throne. He was supported by his Yadava feudatory Bhillama II and the Chalukya chief Baddega II of Lakshmeshwara. He may also have been supported by the Kalachuris of Tripuri, the family of his mother: an enmity had developed between the Rashtrakutas and the Kalachuris during the reign of Krishna III.

In 973, Tailapa dethroned Karka and established a new dynasty. His records state that he became a sovereign after a fierce battle, in which Karka's two "wicked" ministers were killed. Karka's ally Ranakambha, a member of the Rashtrakuta family, was also killed in the battle. According to one theory, Karka was killed in the battle, but according to another theory, he escaped and ruled a small principality around Soraba until 991.

After this victory, Tailapa marched to the Rashtrakuta capital Manyakheta, and occupied the throne. Krishna's grandson Indra, supported by the Ganga chief Marasimha, disputed Tailapa's ascension. Tailapa defeated them decisively: both men ultimately retired as Jain monks, and died by sallekhana (death by starvation) - Marasimha in 975, and Indra in 982.

Marasimha's successor Panchaladeva also fought against Tailapa, and described himself as Chalukya Panchanana ("Lion to the Chalukyas") in his 975 Mulgund inscription. The inscription claims that he ruled the entire peninsular territory to the south of the Krishna River, which is an obvious exaggeration. Tailapa ultimately defeated and killed Panchaladeva: several Chalukya inscriptions boast that Tailapa cut off his head on the battlefield. These inscriptions also give Tailapa the title Panchalamardana Panchanana ("Lion who killed Panchala"). Tailapa must have defeated Panchaladeva around 975-976, because Tailapa's inscriptions dated to around 976 have been found in the neighbouring region.

Tailapa married a Rashtrakuta princess Jakavve, the daughter of Bhammaha Ratta, possibly to strengthen his political position. Gradually, many former Rashtrakuta feudatories accepted his suzerainty:

- Shantivarma, who ruled in the present-day Soraba area, and belonged to the Brahma-Kshatriya Mātūr-vaṃśa family.
- Kannapa, who ruled the Banavasi area: he was one of the first chiefs to recognize Tailapa's suzerainty. His younger brother and successor Sobhanarasa served Tailapa as a loyal general, and received the titles giri-durga-malla (wrestler with hill forts) and samanta-chudamani (the crest-jewel among the feudatories).
- Rattas of Saundatti: The 980 Sogal inscription of Karttavirya and the Saundatti inscription of Mahasamanta Shantivarma acknowledge Tailapa as the overlord of the Rattas.
- The Sinda ruler Pulikala, who ruled the Bijapur area, as well as his successors of the Bagadage branch.
- The Nolambas, as attested by a 981 grant of the Nolamba queen Revaladevi, which was confirmed by Tailapa.

== Conflicts with neighbouring rulers ==
=== Shilaharas ===
Gadayuddha, composed by the Chalukya court poet Ranna, states that by Tailapa's order, prince Satyashraya chased the Konkaneshvara (the Shilahara ruler of Konkan) to the sea. The Shilaharas ultimately transferred their allegiance from the Rashtrakutas to the Chalukyas, as attested by the 997 Bhadana inscription of Mahamandaleshvara Aparajita.

=== Lata ===
According to Gadayuddha, prince Satyashraya also conquered the Gurjaradesa region on Tailapa's orders. Tailapa's commander Barapa, who captured the Lata region in present-day Gujarat, established the Lata Chalukya branch of the family. A 980 inscription that describes Tailapa as a lion to the Lata elephant probably refers to Barapa's conquest of Lata.

=== Paramaras ===
Tailapa seems to have inherited the Rashtrakuta enmity with their northern neighbours, the Paramaras. Tailapa's conflict with the Paramara ruler Munja (Siyaka's successor) finds a mention in several inscriptions and literary works.

According to the 14th century Jain scholar Merutunga, whose Prabandha-Chintamani account of Munja is based on a now-lost Apabhramsa poem called Munja-rasa, Tailapa harassed Munja by raiding his kingdom on multiple occasions. Munja defeated him six times (sixteen times, according to one manuscript). Ultimately, Munja decided to launch a decisive war against Tailapa, and against the advice of his prime minister Rudraditya, crossed the Godavari River to invade the Chalukya kingdom. During this campaign, Tailapa defeated and captured Munja. Merutunga further states that Munja and Tailapa's sister Mrinalavati fell in love during his imprisonment. Meanwhile, Munja's ministers entered the Chalukya kingdom in disguise, and managed to get in touch with Munja. They made a rescue plan, which Munja divulged to Mrinalavati, because he wanted to take her with him. Mrinalavati told her brother about Munja's escape plan. As a result, Tailapa humiliated Munja by forcing him to beg door-to-door, and then had him executed.

While Merutunga's account may not be entirely accurate from a historical perspective, there is little doubt that Munja was killed in Deccan in the mid-990s, as a result of his campaign against Tailapa. The 1003 Kauthem inscription records Tailapa's imprisonment of Utpala (another name for Munja).

In his victory against Munja, Tailapa appears to have been aided by his Yadava vassal Bhillama II. The 1000 Sangamner inscription of Bhillama II poetically boasts that Bhillama thrashed the goddess of prosperity Lakshmi on the battlefield because she had sided with Munja, and forced her to become an obedient housewife in the palace of king Rana-ranga-bhima (a synonym of Tailapa's title Ahavamalla).

=== Cholas ===
As a Rashtrakuta vassal, Tailapa may have participated in his overlord Krishna III's campaigns against their southern neighbours, the Cholas. A 980 inscription describes Tailapa as Indra's thunderbolt to the strong Chola mountain. At that time, the Chola king was Uttama, and it is possible that his attempts to recover the territories captured by Krishna brought him into conflict with Tailapa.

Uttama's successor Rajaraja I invaded and captured several territories in present-day Karnataka, as attested by a 991 Mysore inscription and other inscriptions that mention his conquest of Ganga and Nolamba territories 993 onwards. Tailapa's 992 Kogali inscription states that he stayed at a military camp at Rodda (in present-day Anantapur district) after defeating the Chola king and seizing 150 war elephants from the enemy.

== Successors ==
Extent of Western Chalukya Empire in 1121, over a century after Tailapa's death

Tailapa died around 997. He and his queen Jakavve had two sons: Satyashraya and Dashavarman (alias Yashovarman). Tailapa was succeeded by his elder son Satyashraya, and then by Dashavarman's son Vikramaditya V.

Tailapa maintained his headquarters at the former Rashtrakuta capital Manyakheta. His son and successor Satyashraya ruled Rattapadi, and the contemporary Chola inscriptions often use the term Rattapadi to describe the Chalukya kingdom. The later Chalukya rulers ruled from Kalyani.

== Cultural activities ==
The Chalukya court poet Ranna composed his Gadayuddha during the reign of Ahavamalla, who is identified as Tailapa II by some scholars. However, the text refers to his son Satyashraya as an emperor, and the title Ahavamalla was also held by Satyashraya. Because of this, other scholars believe that the Gadayuddha was composed during Satyashraya's reign. Govinda Pai, a 20th-century Kannada poet, theorized that Ranna composed the first version of Gadayuddha in 982 (during Tailapa's reign). To explain the text's mention of a mid-990s battle and its comparison to a 993 solar eclipse, Pai theorized that Ranna must have revised the text at a later date.

The Kalleshvara temple complex at Bagali, originally consecrated during the late Rashtrakuta rule, was completed during Tailapa's reign. In 987, an individual named Duggimayya consecrated the shrine, and a feudatory named Mahasamanta Adityavarma commissioned a garden in the temple complex.
