= Karka II =

Rashtrakuta Emperor from 972 to 973

Rashtrakuta Emperor
- Reign: c. 972 – c. 973 CE
- Predecessor: Khottiga Amoghavarsha
- Successor: Indra IV
- Dynasty: Rashtrakuta
- Father: Nirupama
- Religion: Jainism

Karka II (r. 972 – 973 CE) was a Rashtrakuta Emperor who succeeded his uncle Khottiga Amoghavarsha. By this time the once great Rashtrakuta empire was in decline and the weaknesses created by the earlier plunder of Manyakheta by Paramara King Siyaka II exposed the Rashtrakutas to further depredation who did not survive for long. During this time of confusion, Chalukya Tailapa II declared independence and killed Karka II, capturing the Rashtrakuta capital Manyakheta.

Karka II was a son of Nirupama, a Rashtrakuta prince who was the younger brother of Khottiga, the previous Rashtrakuta emperor.

== Bibliography ==
- Altekar, Anant Sadashiv (1934) [1934]. The Rashtrakutas And Their Times; being a political, administrative, religious, social, economic and literary history of the Deccan during C. 750 A.D. to C. 1000 A.D. Poona: Oriental Book Agency. OCLC 3793499.
- Reu, Pandit Bisheshwar Nath (1997) [1933]. History of The Rashtrakutas (Rathodas). Jaipur: Publication scheme. ISBN 81-86782-12-5.
- Kamath, Suryanath U. (2001) [1980]. A concise history of Karnataka : from pre-historic times to the present. Bangalore: Jupiter books. LCCN 80905179. OCLC 7796041.

Preceded by Khottiga Amoghavarsha	Rashtrakuta Emperor; 972–973	Succeeded by Indra IV
