= Khottiga =

Rashtrakuta Emperor from 967 to 972

- Nityavarsha

Rashtrakuta Emperor
- Reign: c. 967 – c. 972 CE
- Predecessor: Krishna III
- Successor: Karka II
- Died: 972 CE; Manyakheta, Rashtrakuta Empire (present-day Malkhed, India)
- Father: Amoghavarsha III
- Religion: Jainism

Khottiga or Amoghavarsha IV (r. 967–972 CE), who bore the title Nityavarsha, was a Rashtrakuta Emperor. During his reign, the Rashtrakutas started to decline. The Paramara King Siyaka II plundered Manyakheta and Khottiga died fighting them. This information is available from the Jain work Mahapurana written by Pushpadanta. He was succeeded by Karka II who only reigned for a few months. In 968 CE, Khottiga installed a panavatta at Danavulapadu Jain temple for the Mahamastakabhisheka of Shantinatha.

Preceded by Krishna III	Rashtrakuta Emperor; 967–972	Succeeded by Karka II
