= Rashtrakuta Empire =

Early medieval Indian dynasty (753–982)

- 753–982
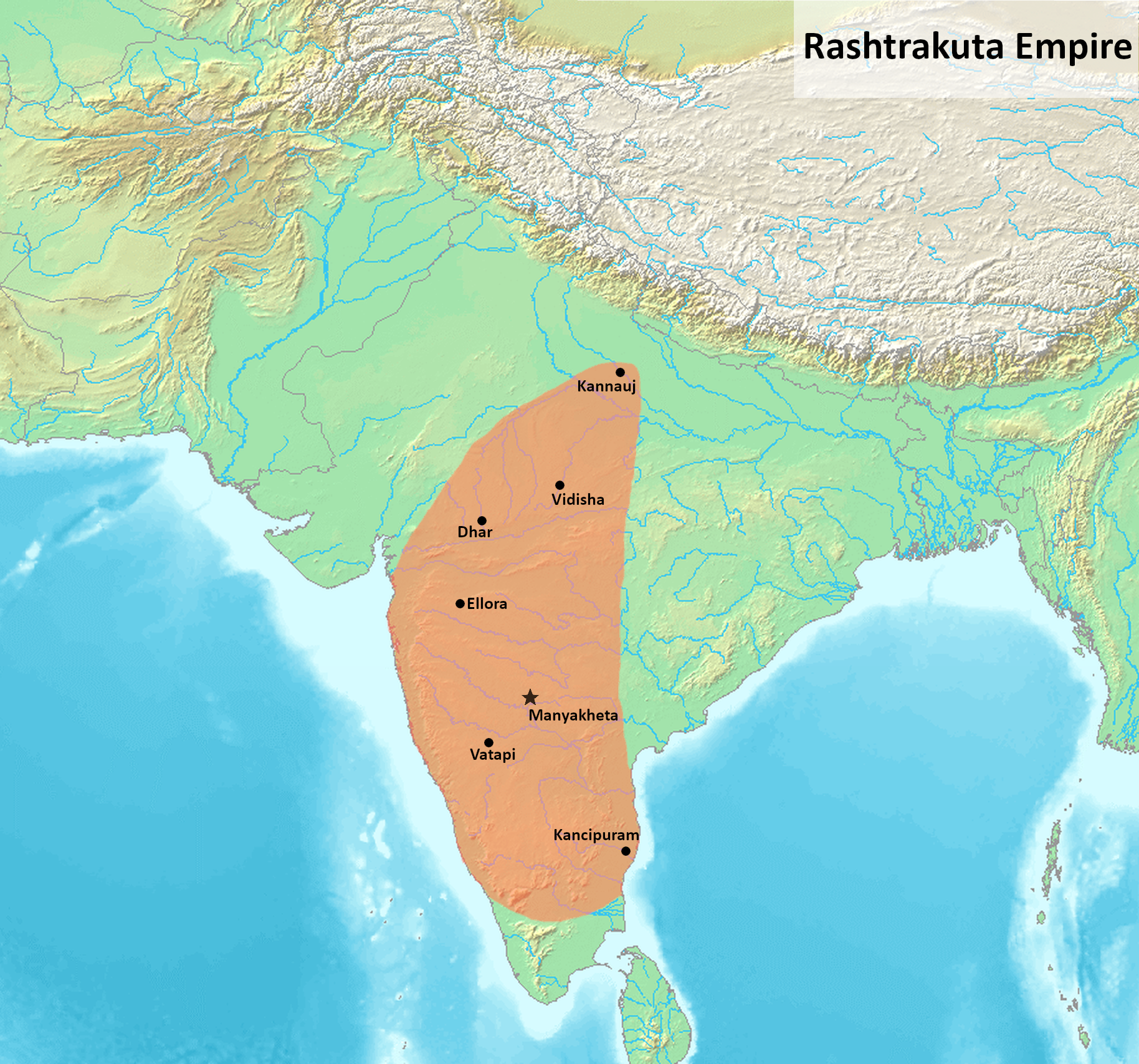
- Rashtrakuta control c. 800 CE, during the Tripartite Struggle
- Capital: Manyakheta
- Common languages: Kannada; Sanskrit
- Religion: Jainism; Hinduism; Buddhism
- Government: Monarchy
- Maharajadhiraja
  - 753–756: Dantidurga
  - 973–982: Indra IV
- History
  - Earliest Rashtrakuta records: 753
  - Established: 753
  - Disestablished: 20 March 982
Preceded by	Succeeded by
Chalukya dynasty	Western Chalukya Empire; Paramara dynasty
- Today part of: India

The Rashtrakuta Empire (Kannada: [raːʂʈrɐkuːʈɐ]) was an early medieval Indian empire ruling large parts of the Indian subcontinent between the 6th and 10th centuries. At their peak the Rashtrakutas of Manyakheta ruled a vast empire stretching from the Ganges River and Yamuna River doab in the north to Kanyakumari in the south, a fruitful time of political expansion, architectural achievements and famous literary contributions.

The earliest known Rashtrakuta inscription is a 7th-century copper plate grant detailing their rule from Manapur, a city in Central or West India. Other ruling Rashtrakuta clans from the same period mentioned in inscriptions were the kings of Achalapur and the rulers of Kannauj. The Achalpur clan was a feudatory of the Badami Chalukyas, and during the rule of Dantidurga, it overthrew Chalukya Kirtivarman II and went on to build an empire with the Kalaburagi region in modern Karnataka as its base. This clan came to be known as the Rashtrakutas of Manyakheta, rising to power in South India in 753 AD.

At the same time the Pala dynasty of Bengal and the Prathihara dynasty of Gurjaratra were gaining force in eastern and northwestern India respectively. This period, between the 8th and the 10th centuries, saw a tripartite struggle for the resources of the rich Gangetic Plains, with each of these empires annexing the seat of power at Kannauj for short periods of time. An Arabic text, Silsilat al-Tawarikh (851), called the Rashtrakutas one of the four principal empires of the world.

Interpretations of some historians suggest that the only later kings of the dynasty were influenced by Jainism. However, other historians contend their Jain affiliation was not a later development and that historical evidence shows they were devout followers of the Jain Dharma, and that successive kings continued their family's legacy of Jain patronage. During their rule, Jain monks, Jain mathematicians and Jain scholars contributed important works in Kannada and Sanskrit. Amoghavarsha I, the most famous king of this dynasty wrote Kavirajamarga, a landmark literary work in the Kannada language. Architecture reached a milestone in the Dravidian style, the finest example of which is seen in the Kailasanatha Temple at Ellora in modern Maharashtra. Other important contributions are the Kashi-Vishwanatha temple and the Jain~Narayana temple at Pattadakal in modern Karnataka, both of which are UNESCO World Heritage Sites.

== History ==
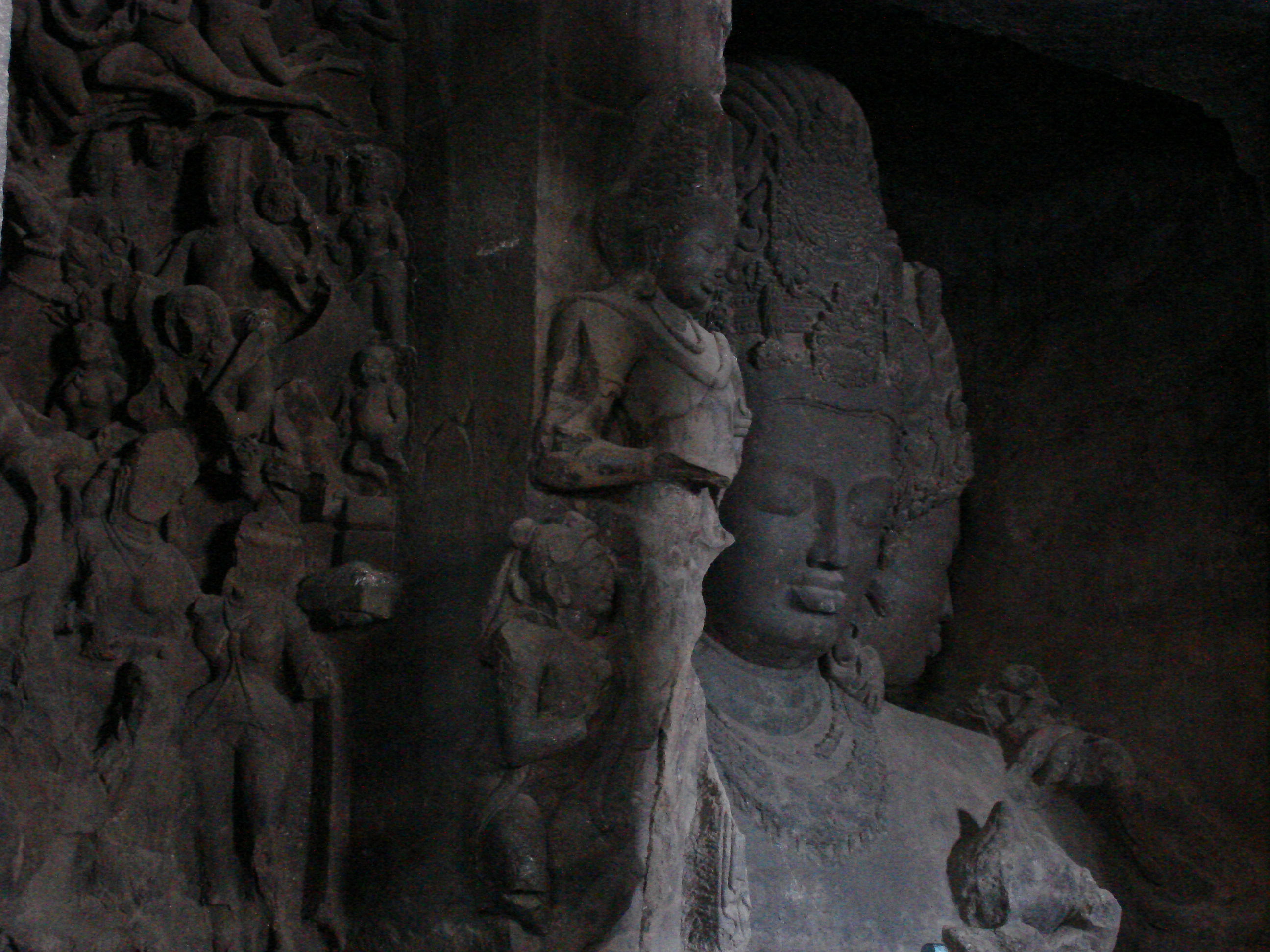
Trimurti statue in Elephanta caves, a UNESCO World Heritage Site

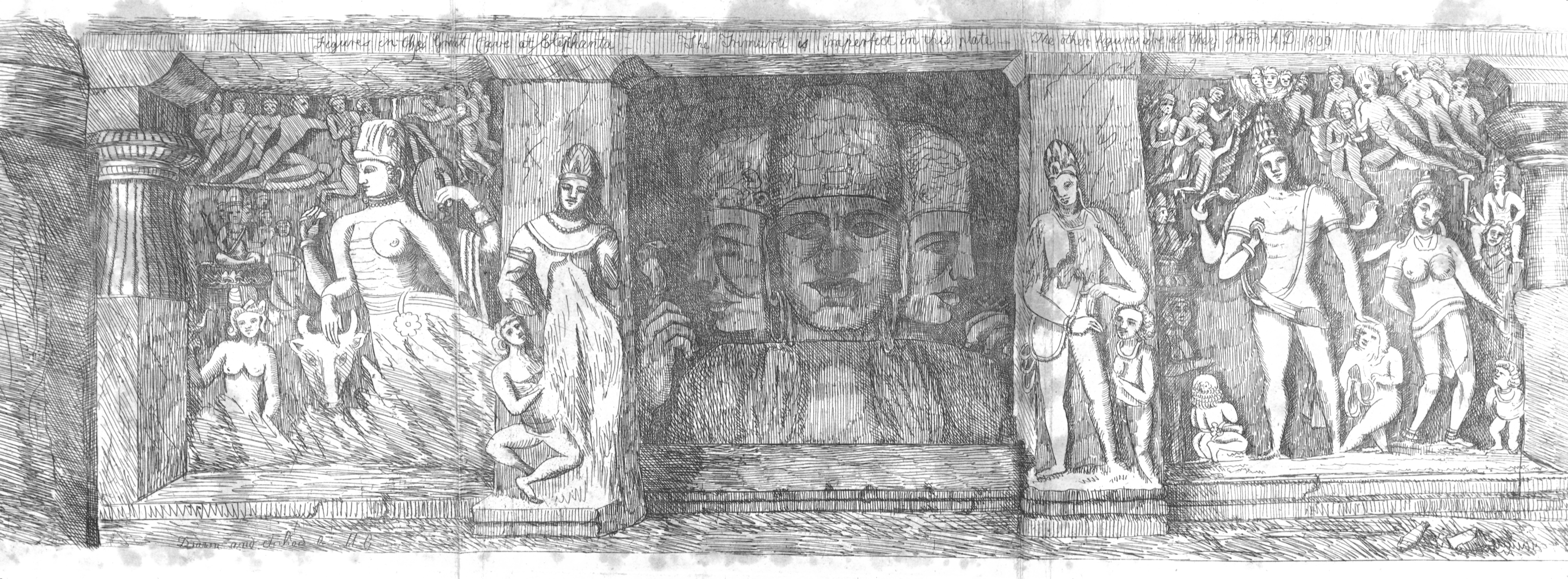
A sketch and a photo of the Elephanta Caves in 19th century.

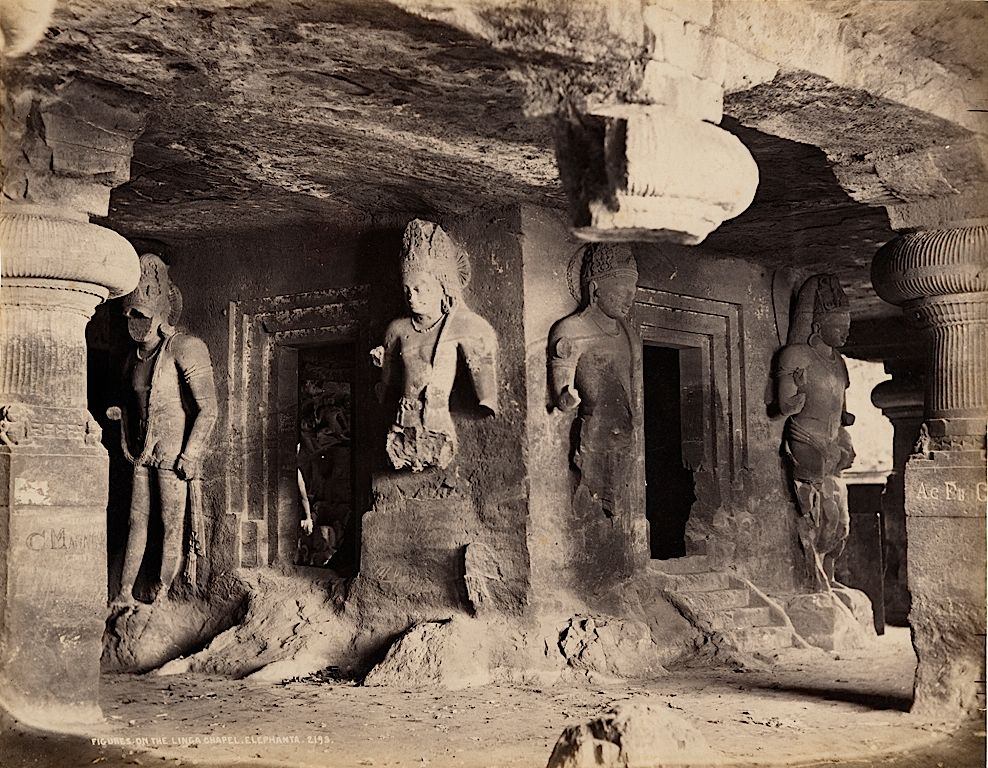
Samuel Bourne, "Figures on the Linga Chapel. Elephanta," 1863-1869, photograph mounted on cardboard sheet, Department of Image Collections, National Gallery of Art Library, Washington, DC

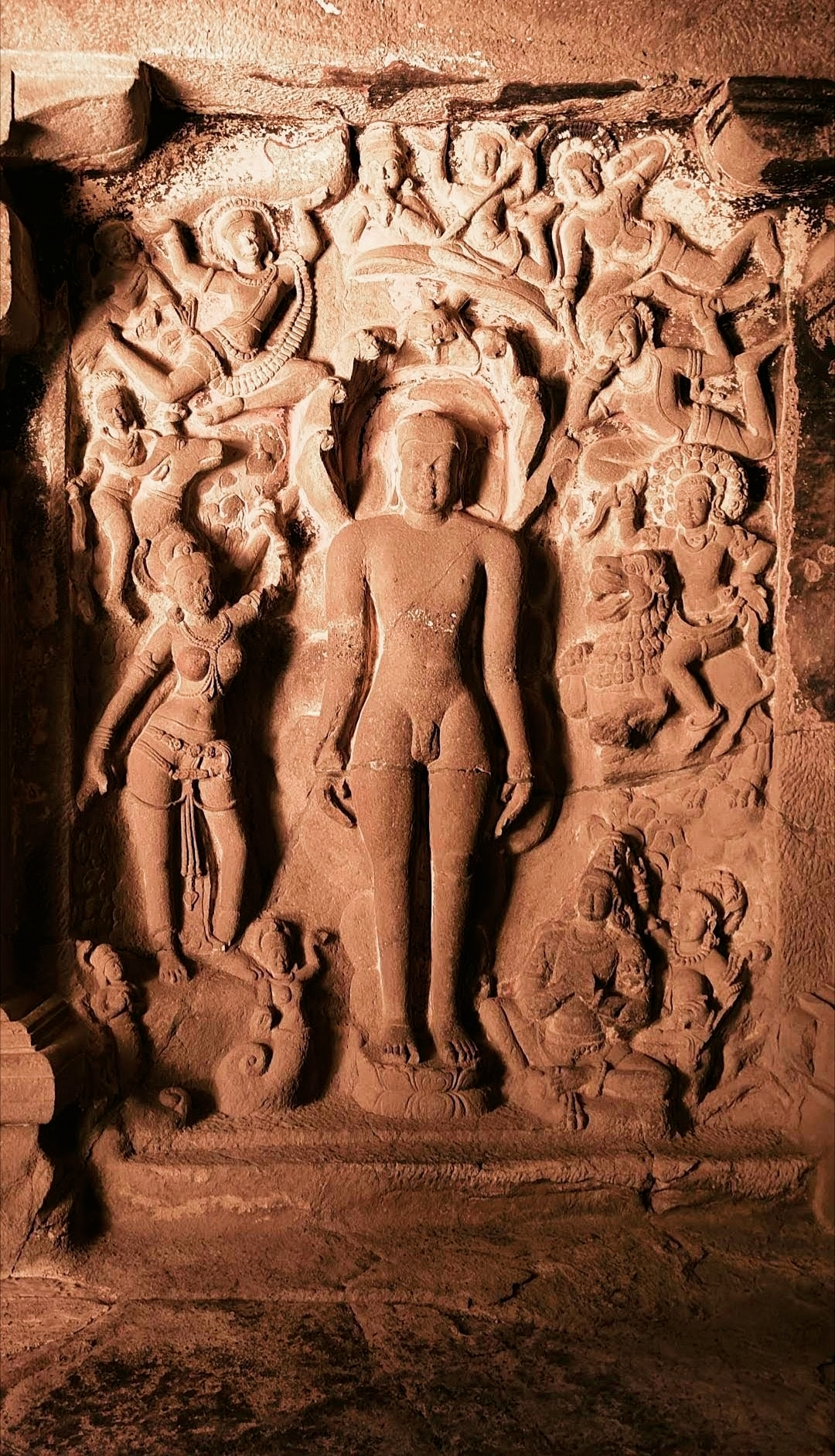
Parshvanatha, Ellora Caves UNESCO World Heritage Site

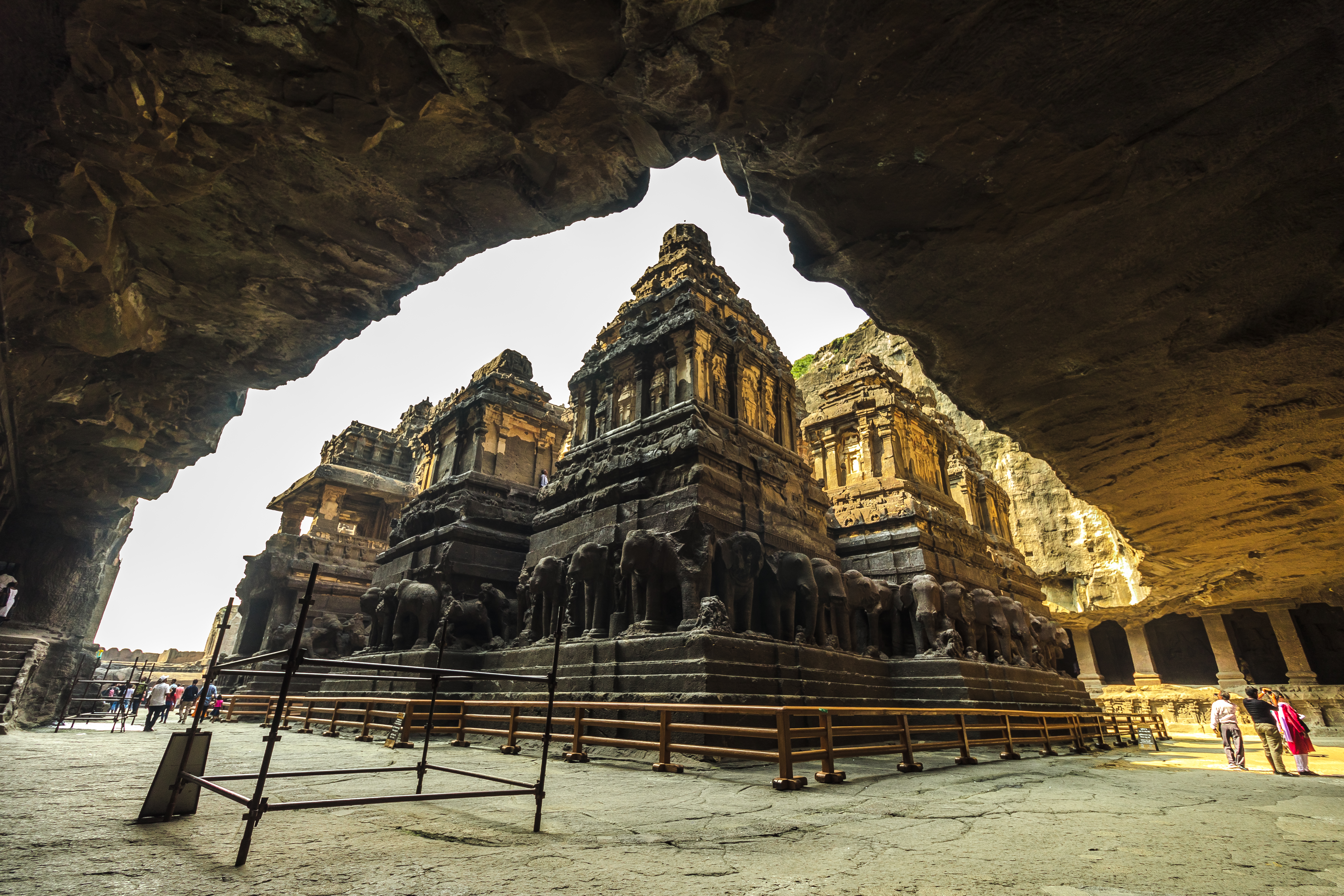
Kailashanatha Temple, one of the 34 cave temples and monasteries known collectively as the Ellora Caves, was built during the 8th century CE by the Rashtrakuta king Krishna I.(r. 756–773 CE)

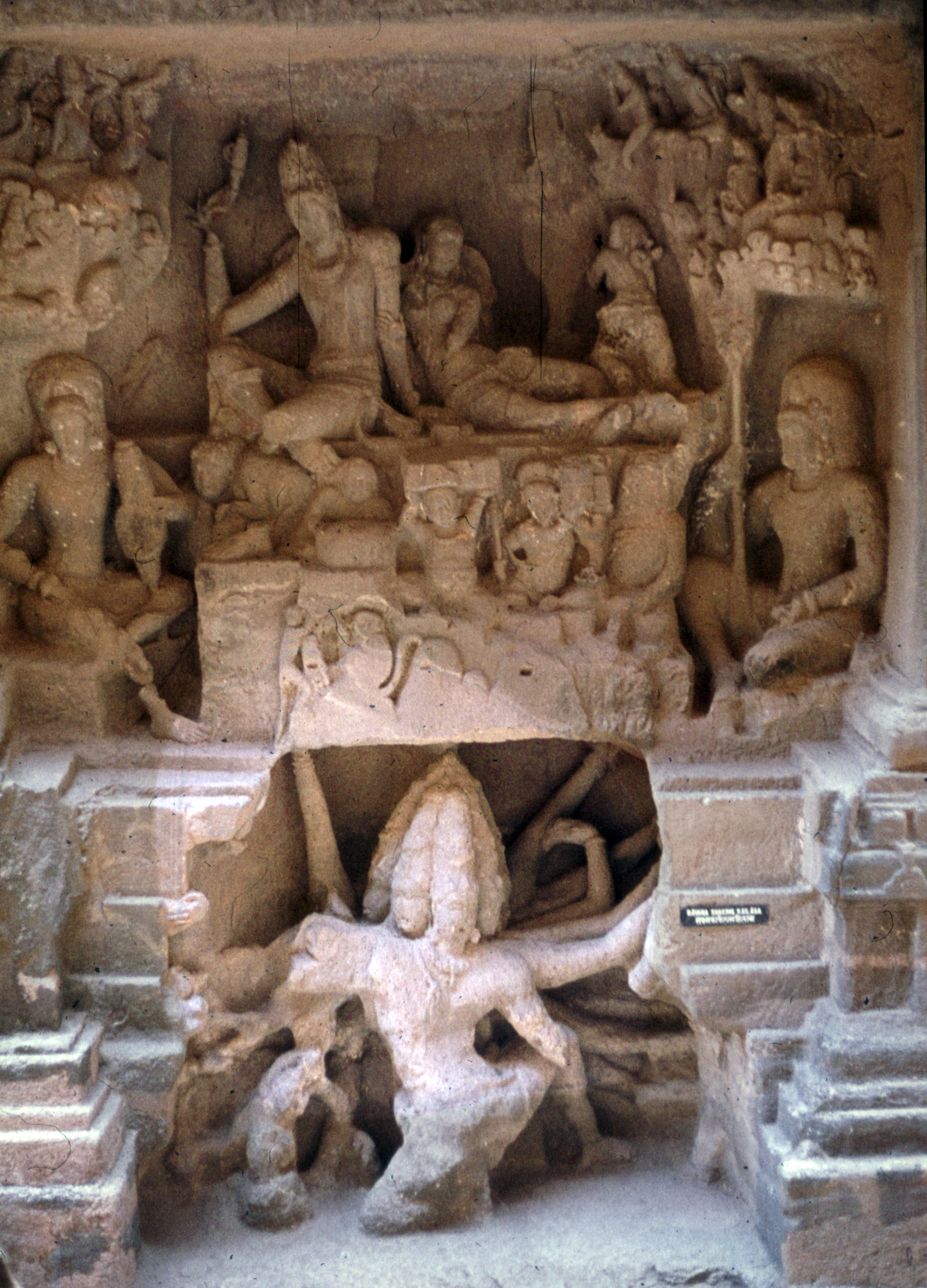
Ravananugraha relief.

The sources for Rashtrakuta history include medieval inscriptions, ancient literature in the Pali language, contemporaneous literature in Sanskrit and Kannada and the notes of the Arab travellers. It is uncertain if there is any connection between the several Rashtrakuta dynasties that ruled small kingdoms in northern and central India, and the Deccan, in the 6th and 7th centuries, and the most famous later dynasty, the Rashtrakutas of Manyakheta (present-day Malkhed in the Kalaburagi district, Karnataka state), who ruled between the 8th and 10th centuries.

Theories about the dynastic lineage (Surya Vamsa — Solar line and Chandra Vamsa — Lunar line), the native region and the ancestral home have been put forward, based on the information gleaned from inscriptions, royal emblems, the ancient clan names such as "Rashtrika", epithets (Ratta, Rashtrakuta, Lattalura Puravaradhiswara), the names of princes and princesses of the dynasty, and clues from relics such as coins. However, the origin of the Rashtrakuta dynasty remains disputed, and the proposed ethnic origins of the dynasty include the Kannadiga, Reddi, the Maratha, the tribes from the Punjab region, or other north western ethnic groups of India.

Scholars however concur that the rulers of the imperial dynasty in the 8th to 10th century made the Kannada language as important as Sanskrit. Rashtrakuta inscriptions use both Kannada and Sanskrit (historians Sheldon Pollock and Jan Houben claim they are mostly in Kannada), and the rulers encouraged literature in both languages. The earliest existing Kannada literary writings are credited to their court poets and royalty. Though these Rashtrakutas were Kannadigas, they were conversant in a northern Deccan language as well.

=== Early history ===
The heart of the Rashtrakuta Empire included nearly all of Karnataka, Maharashtra and parts of Andhra Pradesh, an area which the Rashtrakutas ruled for over two centuries. The Samangadh copper plate grant (753) confirms that the feudatory King Dantidurga, who probably ruled from Achalapura in Berar (modern Elichpur in Maharashtra), defeated the great Karnatic army (referring to the army of the Badami Chalukyas) of Kirtivarman II of Badami in 753 and took control of the northern regions of the Chalukya empire. He then helped his son-in-law, Pallava King Nandivarman II regain Kanchi from the Chalukyas and defeated the Gurjaras, and the rulers of Kalinga, Kosala and Srisailam.

Dantidurga's successor Krishna I brought major portions of present-day Karnataka and Konkan under his control. During the rule of Dhruva Dharavarsha who took control in 780, the kingdom expanded into an empire that encompassed all of the territory between the Kaveri River and Central India. He led successful expeditions to Kannauj, the seat of northern Indian power where he defeated the Pratiharas and the Palas of Bengal, gaining him fame and vast booty but not more territory. He also brought the Eastern Chalukyas and Gangas of Talakad under his control. According to Altekar and Sen, the Rashtrakutas became a pan-India power during his rule.

=== Expansion ===
The Rashtrakutas and neighbouring polities in South Asia circa 800 CE.

The ascent of Dhruva Dharavarsha's third son, Govinda III, to the throne heralded an era of success like never before. There is uncertainty about the location of the early capital of the Rashtrakutas at this time. During his rule there was a three way conflict between the Rashtrakutas, the Palas and the Pratiharas for control over the Gangetic plains. Describing his victories over the Pratihara Emperor Nagabhatta II and the Pala Emperor Dharmapala, the Sanjan inscription states the horses of Govinda III drank from the icy waters of the Himalayan streams and his war elephants tasted the sacred waters of the Ganges. His military exploits have been compared to those of Alexander the Great and Arjuna of Mahabharata. Having conquered Kannauj, he travelled south, took firm hold over Gujarat, Kosala (Kaushal), Gangavadi, humbled the Pallavas of Kanchi, installed a ruler of his choice in Vengi and received two statues as an act of submission from the king of Ceylon (one statue of the king and another of his minister). The Cholas, the Pandyas and the Kongu Cheras of Karur all paid him tribute. As one historian puts it, the drums of the Deccan were heard from the Himalayan caves to the shores of the Malabar Coast. The Rashtrakutas empire now spread over the areas from Cape Comorin to Kannauj and from Banaras to Bharuch.

The successor of Govinda III, Amoghavarsha I made Manyakheta his capital and ruled a large empire. Manyakheta remained the Rashtrakutas' regal capital until the end of the empire. He came to the throne in 814 but it was not until 821 that he had suppressed revolts from feudatories and ministers. Amoghavarsha I made peace with the Western Ganga dynasty by giving them his two daughters in marriage, and then defeated the invading Eastern Chalukyas at Vingavalli and assumed the title Viranarayana. His rule was not as militant as that of Govinda III as he preferred to maintain friendly relations with his neighbours, the Gangas, the Eastern Chalukyas and the Pallavas with whom he also cultivated marital ties. His era was an enriching one for the arts, literature and religion. Widely seen as the most famous of the Rashtrakuta Emperors, Amoghavarsha I was an accomplished scholar in Kannada and Sanskrit. His Kavirajamarga is considered an important landmark in Kannada poetics and Prashnottara Ratnamalika in Sanskrit is a writing of high merit and was later translated into the Tibetan language. Because of his religious temperament, his interest in the arts and literature and his peace-loving nature, he has been compared to the emperor Ashoka and called "Ashoka of the South".

During the rule of Krishna II, the empire faced a revolt from the Eastern Chalukyas and its size decreased to the area including most of the Western Deccan and Gujarat. Krishna II ended the independent status of the Gujarat branch and brought it under direct control from Manyakheta. Indra III recovered the dynasty's fortunes in central India by defeating the Kingdom of Malwa and then invaded the doab region of the Ganges and Jamuna rivers. He also defeated the dynasty's traditional enemies, the Pratiharas and the Palas, while maintaining his influence over Vengi. The effect of his victories in Kannauj lasted several years according to the 930 copper plate inscription of Emperor Govinda IV. After a succession of weak kings during whose reigns the empire lost control of territories in the north and east, Krishna III the last great ruler consolidated the empire so that it stretched from the Narmada River to Kaveri River and included the northern Tamil country (Tondaimandalam) while levying tribute on the king of Ceylon.

=== Decline ===
In 972, during the rule of Khottiga Amoghavarsha, the Malwa King Siyaka Harsha attacked the empire and plundered Manyakheta, the capital of the Rashtrakutas. This seriously undermined the reputation of the Rastrakuta Empire and consequently led to its downfall. The final decline was sudden as Tailapa II, a feudatory of the Rashtrakuta ruling from Tardavadi province in modern Bijapur district, declared himself independent by taking advantage of this defeat. Indra IV, the last emperor, committed Sallekhana (fasting unto death practised by Jain monks) at Shravanabelagola. With the fall of the Rashtrakutas, their feudatories and related clans in the Deccan and northern India declared independence. The Western Chalukyas annexed Manyakheta and made it their capital until 1015 and built an impressive empire in the Rashtrakuta heartland during the 11th century. The focus of dominance shifted to the Krishna River – Godavari River doab called Vengi. The former feudatories of the Rashtrakutas in western Deccan were brought under control of the Chalukyas, and the hitherto-suppressed Cholas of Tanjore became their arch enemies in the south.

In conclusion, the rise of Rashtrakutas of Manyakheta had a great impact on India, even on India's north. Sulaiman (851), Al-Masudi (944) and Ibn Khurdadba (912) wrote that their empire was the largest in contemporary India and Sulaiman further called it one among the four great contemporary empires of the world. According to the travelogues of the Arabs Al Masudi and Ibn Khordidbih of the 10th century, "most of the kings of Hindustan turned their faces towards the Rashtrakuta king while they were praying, and they prostrated themselves before his ambassadors. The Rashtrakuta king was known as the "King of kings" (Rajadhiraja) who possessed the mightiest of armies and whose domains extended from Konkan to Sind." Some historians have called these times an "Age of Imperial Kannauj". Since the Rashtrakutas successfully captured Kannauj, levied tribute on its rulers and presented themselves as masters of North India, the era could also be called the "Age of Imperial Karnataka". During their political expansion into central and northern India in the 8th to the 10th centuries, the Rashtrakutas or their relatives created several kingdoms that either ruled during the reign of the parent empire or continued to rule for centuries after its fall or came to power much later. Well known among these were the Rashtrakutas of Gujarat (757–888), the Rattas of Saundatti (875–1230) in modern Karnataka, the Gahadavalas of Kannauj (1068–1223), the Rashtrakutas of Rajasthan (known as Rajputana) and ruling from Hastikundi or Hathundi (893–996), Dahal (near Jabalpur), Rathores of Mandore (near Jodhpur), the Rathores of Dhanop, Rashtraudha dynasty of Mayuragiri in modern Maharashtra and Rashtrakutas of Kannauj. Rajadhiraja Chola's conquest of the island of Ceylon in the early 11th century CE led to the fall of four kings there. According to historian K. Pillay, one of them, King Madavarajah of the Jaffna kingdom, was an usurper from the Rashtrakuta dynasty.

== Administration ==
Inscriptions and other literary records indicate the Rashtrakutas selected the crown prince based on heredity. The crown did not always pass on to the eldest son. Abilities were considered more important than age and chronology of birth, as exemplified by the crowning of Govinda III who was the third son of king Dhruva Dharavarsha. The most important position under the king was the Chief Minister (Mahasandhivigrahi) whose position came with five insignia commensurate with his position namely, a flag, a conch, a fan, a white umbrella, a large drum and five musical instruments called Panchamahashabdas. Under him was the commander (Dandanayaka), the foreign minister (Mahakshapataladhikrita) and a prime minister (Mahamatya or Purnamathya), all of whom were usually associated with one of the feudatory kings and must have held a position in government equivalent to a premier. A Mahasamantha was a feudatory or higher ranking regal officer. All cabinet ministers were well versed in political science (Rajneeti) and possessed military training. There were cases where women supervised significant areas as when Revakanimaddi, daughter of Amoghavarsha I, administered Edathore Vishaya.

The kingdom was divided into Mandala or Rashtras (provinces). A Rashtra was ruled by a Rashtrapathi who on occasion was the emperor himself. Amoghavarsha I's empire had sixteen Rashtras. Under a Rashtra was a Vishaya (district) overseen by a Vishayapathi. Trusted ministers sometimes ruled more than a Rashtra. For example, Bankesha, a commander of Amoghavarsha I headed several Rashtras, besides ruling Banavasi which included 12,000 villages in that territory, lesser Rashtras included: Kunduru (500), Belvola (300), Puligere (300) and Kundarge (70). Below the Vishaya was the Nadu looked after by the Nadugowda (or Nadugavunda); sometimes there were two such officials, one assuming the position through heredity and another appointed centrally. The lowest division was a Grama or village administered by a Gramapathi or Prabhu Gavunda.

The Rashtrakuta army consisted of large contingents of infantry, horsemen, and elephants. A standing army was always ready for war in a cantonment (Sthirabhuta Kataka) in the regal capital of Manyakheta. Large armies were also maintained by the feudatory kings who were expected to contribute to the defence of the empire in case of war. Chieftains and all the officials also served as commanders whose postings were transferable if the need arose.

The Rashtrakutas issued coins (minted in an Akkashale) such as Suvarna, Drammas in silver and gold weighing 65 grains, Kalanju weighing 48 grains, Gadyanaka weighing 96 grains, Kasu weighing 15 grains, Manjati with 2.5 grains and Akkam of 1.25 grain.

== Economy ==
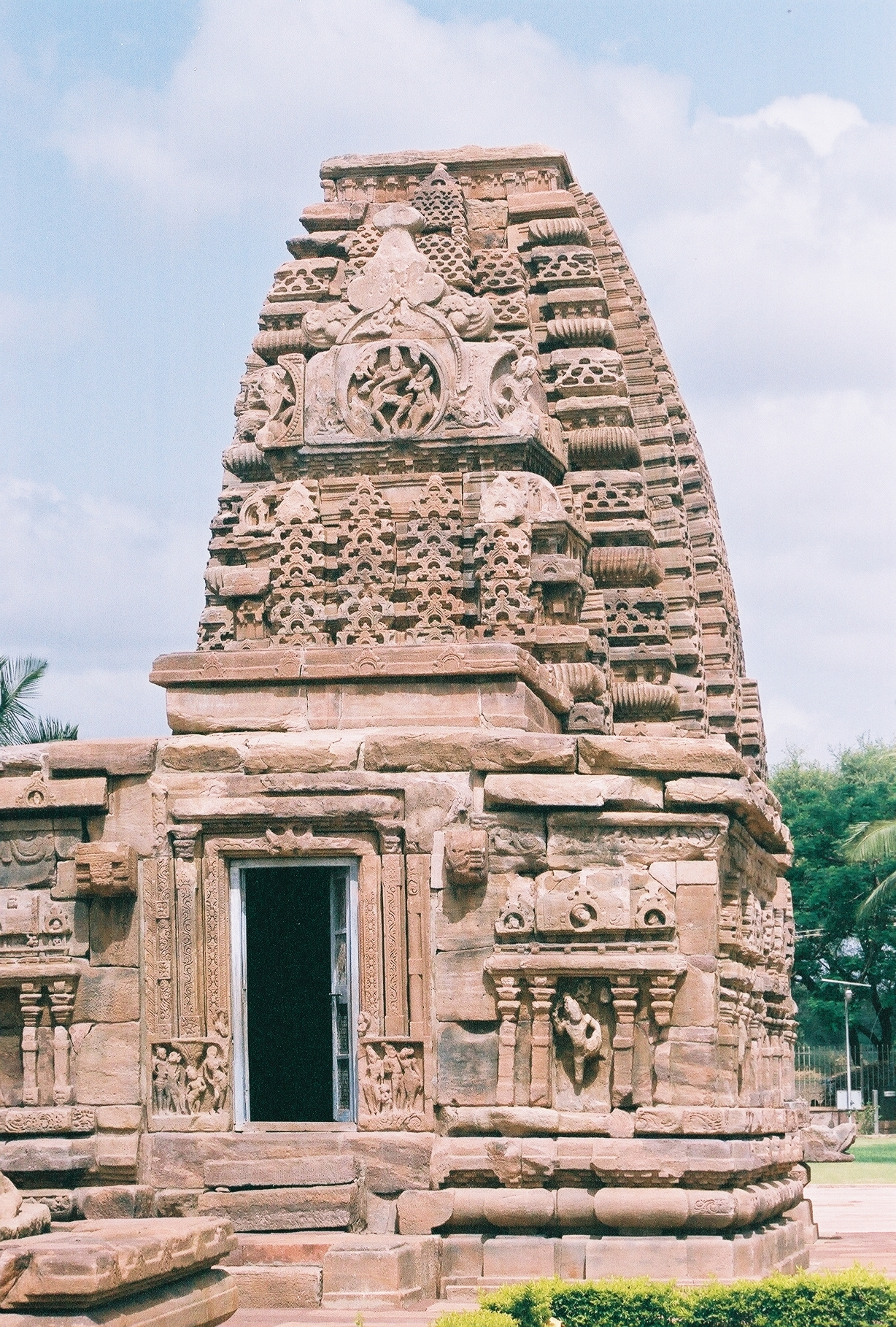
Kashivishvanatha temple at Pattadakal, Karnataka

The Rashtrakuta economy was sustained by its natural and agricultural produce, its manufacturing revenues and moneys gained from its conquests. Cotton was the chief crop of the regions of southern Gujarat, Khandesh and Berar. Minnagar, Gujarat, Ujjain, Paithan and Tagara were important centres of textile industry. Muslin cloth were manufactured in Paithan and Warangal. The cotton yarn and cloth was exported from Bharoch. White calicos were manufactured in Burhanpur and Berar and exported to Persia, Byzantines, Khazaria, Arabia and Egypt. The Konkan region, ruled by the feudatory Silharas, produced large quantities of betel leaves, coconut and rice while the lush forests of Mysore, ruled by the feudatory Gangas, produced such woods as sandal, timber, teak and ebony. Incense and perfumes were exported from the ports of Thana and Saimur.

The Deccan was rich in minerals, though its soil was not as fertile as that of the Gangetic plains. The copper mines of Cudappah, Bellary, Chanda, Buldhana, Narsingpur, Ahmadnagar, Bijapur and Dharwar were an important source of income and played an important role in the economy. Diamonds were mined in Cudappah, Bellary, Kurnool and Golconda; the capital Manyakheta and Devagiri were important diamond and jewellery trading centres. The leather industry and tanning flourished in Gujarat and some regions of northern Maharashtra. Mysore with its vast elephant herds was important for the ivory industry.

The Rashtrakuta empire controlled most of the western sea board of the subcontinent which facilitated its maritime trade. The Gujarat branch of the empire earned a significant income from the port of Bharoch, one of the most prominent ports in the world at that time. The empire's chief exports were cotton yarn, cotton cloth, muslins, hides, mats, indigo, incense, perfumes, betel nuts, coconuts, sandal, teak, timber, sesame oil and ivory. Its major imports were pearls, gold, dates from Arabia, slaves, Italian wines, tin, lead, topaz, storax, sweet clover, flint glass, antimony, gold and silver coins, singing boys and girls (for the entertainment of the royalty) from other lands. Trading in horses was an important and profitable business, monopolised by the Arabs and some local merchants. The Rashtrakuta government levied a shipping tax of one golden Gadyanaka on all foreign vessels embarking to any other ports and a fee of one silver Ctharna ( a coin) on vessels travelling locally.

Artists and craftsman operated as corporations (guilds) rather than as individual business. Inscriptions mention guilds of weavers, oilmen, artisans, basket and mat makers and fruit sellers. A Saundatti inscription refers to an assemblage of all the people of a district headed by the guilds of the region. Some guilds were considered superior to others, just as some corporations were, and received royal charters determining their powers and privileges. Inscriptions suggest these guilds had their own militia to protect goods in transit and, like village assemblies, they operated banks that lent money to traders and businesses.

The government's income came from five principal sources: regular taxes, occasional taxes, fines, income taxes, miscellaneous taxes and tributes from feudatories. An emergency tax was imposed occasionally and were applicable when the kingdom was under duress, such as when it faced natural calamities, or was preparing for war or overcoming war's ravages. Income tax included taxes on crown land, wasteland, specific types of trees considered valuable to the economy, mines, salt, treasures unearthed by prospectors. Additionally, customary presents were given to the king or royal officers on such festive occasions as marriage or the birth of a son.

The king determined the tax levels based on need and circumstances in the kingdom while ensuring that an undue burden was not placed on the peasants. The land owner or tenant paid a variety of taxes, including land taxes, produce taxes and payment of the overhead for maintenance of the Gavunda (village head). Land taxes were varied, based on type of land, its produce and situation and ranged from 8% to 16%. A Banavasi inscription of 941 mentions reassessment of land tax due to the drying up of an old irrigation canal in the region. The land tax may have been as high as 20% to pay for expenses of a military frequently at war. In most of the kingdom, land taxes were paid in goods and services and rarely was cash accepted. A portion of all taxes earned by the government (usually 15%) was returned to the villages for maintenance.

Taxes were levied on artisans such as potters, sheep herders, weavers, oilmen, shopkeepers, stall owners, brewers and gardeners. Taxes on perishable items such as fish, meat, honey, medicine, fruits and essentials like fuel was as high as 16%. Taxes on salt and minerals were mandatory although the empire did not claim sole ownership of mines, implying that private mineral prospecting and the quarrying business may have been active. The state claimed all such properties whose deceased legal owner had no immediate family to make an inheritance claim. Other miscellaneous taxes included ferry and house taxes. Only Brahmins and their temple institutions were taxed at a lower rate.

== Culture ==
=== Religion ===
The Rashtrakuta kings supported the popular religions of the day in the traditional spirit of religious tolerance. Scholars have offered various arguments regarding which specific religion the Rashtrakutas favoured, basing their evidence on inscriptions, coins and contemporary literature. Some claim the Rashtrakutas were inclined towards Jainism since many of the scholars who flourished in their courts and wrote in Sanskrit, Kannada, and a few in Apabhramsha and Prakrit were Jains. The Rashtrakutas built well-known Jain temples at locations such as Lokapura in Bagalkot district and their loyal feudatory, the Western Ganga Dynasty, built Jain monuments at Shravanabelagola and Kambadahalli. Scholars have suggested that Jainism was a principal religion at the very heart of the empire in modern Karnataka, and accounted for more than 30% of the population and dominating the culture of the region. Numerous Jain monks flourished during the rule of the Rashtrakutas, including Aryanandi, Virasena, Jinasena, Gunasena, Gunabhadra, and Lokasena, who served as gurus in the Rashtrakuta court. Under their patronage, numerous Kannada, Sanskrit Jain texts were composed, including the Dhavala, Adi Purana, and Mahapurana. King Amoghavarsha was a disciple of the Jain acharya Jinasena and wrote in his religious writing, Prashnottara Ratnamalika, "having bowed to Vardhamana (Mahavira), He is also credited with composing "Kavirajamarga" along with his guru. The mathematician Mahaviracharya wrote in his Ganita Sarasangraha, "The subjects under Amoghavarsha are happy and the land yields plenty of grain. May the kingdom of King Nripatunga Amoghavarsha, follower of Jainism ever increase far and wide." The Jain Monk Kumudendu Muni, in his writing "Siribhoovalaya", claims to be the guru of Amoghavarsha and the vassal Ganga king Shivamara II. According to historian Altekar, Amoghavarsha was so deeply moved by a sense of renunciation (vairagya) he handed over the kingdom to Krishna II and spent his final days with Acharya Jinasena. It is also suggested that he may have even become a monk and ultimately taken Sallekhana (ritual fasting unto death), and the last king of the dynasty Indra IV, renounced royal life and became a Jain monk and performed Sallekhana at Shravanabelagola on 20 March 982 CE. With Indra IV’s death, the main line of the Rashtrakuta dynasty came to an end. However, their familial descendants, such as the Shilaharas and Rattas, continued the legacy of patronizing Jainism.

However, according to the historian Reu, the Rashtrakuta kings patronised the Hindu sects of Shaivism, Vaishnavism and Shaktism. Some of their grants and coins have images of deities associated with the Hinduism. Almost all Rashtrakuta inscriptions begin with an invocation to Vishnu or Shiva. According to the historians Chopra, Ravindran and Subrahmanian, Amoghavarsha was deeply influenced by Jainism though he worshiped Hindu gods and goddesses. According to Suryanatha Kamath, the Rashtrakutas were followers of the Vedic religions, as Garuda was the royal emblem of the dynasty. He further states that Amoghavarsha may have been influenced by Jainism, it may have been only in his old age. But Sadasiva Altekar, and P.B Desai argue that he became a Jain monk in his old age. The historian Radhey Shyam Chaurasia claims Amoghavarsha followed the Jain religion and patronised the Digambara sect of Jainism. Many of their inscriptions begin by specifying the temple or religious institution to which the grant or donation was being made. The Sanjan inscriptions tells of King Amoghavarsha I sacrificing a finger from his left hand at the Lakshmi temple at Kolhapur. This record, according to Kamath is a document testifying his devotion to the Hindu goddess Mahalakshmi. However according to Desai and Settar, this is a misinterpretation and the inscription uses the word "bali", which in context means "dana" (gift or donation), indicating he made a donation for the temple to avert a calamity in his kingdom. The temple itself is believed to have originally been dedicated to Padmāvatī the consort (Yakshin) of Tirthankara Parshvanatha. Historian Paul Dundas opines that during Amoghavarsha’s time, the site may have been associated with Jain worship, particularly Yakshi Padmavati, and only later became identified with the Hindu goddess Mahalakshmi. King Dantidurga performed the Hiranyagarbha (a ritual in Hinduism), and the Sanjan and Cambay plates of the rule of King Govinda IV mention Brahmins performing such rituals as Rajasuya, Vajapeya and Agnishtoma. An early copper plate grant of King Dantidurga (753) shows an image of god Shiva and the coins of his successor, King Krishna I (768), bear the legend Parama Maheshwara (another name for Shiva). The kings' titles such as Veeranarayana showed their Vaishnava leanings. Their flag had the sign of the Ganges and Yamuna rivers, perhaps copied from the Badami Chalukyas. The famous Kailasa temple at Ellora built to honor the Hindu god Shiva and other rock-cut caves attributed to them show that the Hinduism was flourishing under their patronage. Their family deity was a goddess by name Latana (also known as Rashtrashyena, Manasa Vindyavasini) who took the form of a falcon to save the kingdom. They built temples with icons and ornamentation that satisfied the needs of different faiths. The temple at Salotgi was meant for followers of Shiva and Vishnu and the temple at Kargudri was meant for worshipers of Shiva, Vishnu and Bhaskara (Surya, the sun god).

In short, the Rashtrakuta rule was tolerant to multiple popular religions, Jainism, Vaishnavaism and Shaivism. Buddhism too found support and was popular in places such as Dambal and Balligavi, although it had declined significantly by this time. The decline of Buddhism in South India began in the 8th century with the spread of Adi Shankara's Advaita philosophy. Islamic contact with South India began as early as the 7th century, a result of trade between the Southern kingdoms and Arab lands. Jumma Masjids existed in the Rashtrakuta empire by the 10th century and many Muslims lived and mosques flourished on the coasts, specifically in towns such as Kayalpattanam and Nagore. Muslim settlers married local women; their children were known as Mappilas (Moplahs) and were actively involved in horse trading and manning shipping fleets. The Rastrakuta kings were praised by an Arab traveller, Al-Masʿūdī, for supporting the settlement of Muslim traders in the Konkan region and allowing them to practice Islam. The Rastrakutas were also noted for providing great support to them and establishment of mosques in port towns located in Konkan by him during the early 10th century. The Saymur district was inhabited by about 10,000 Muslims according to Al-Masʿūdī.

=== Society ===
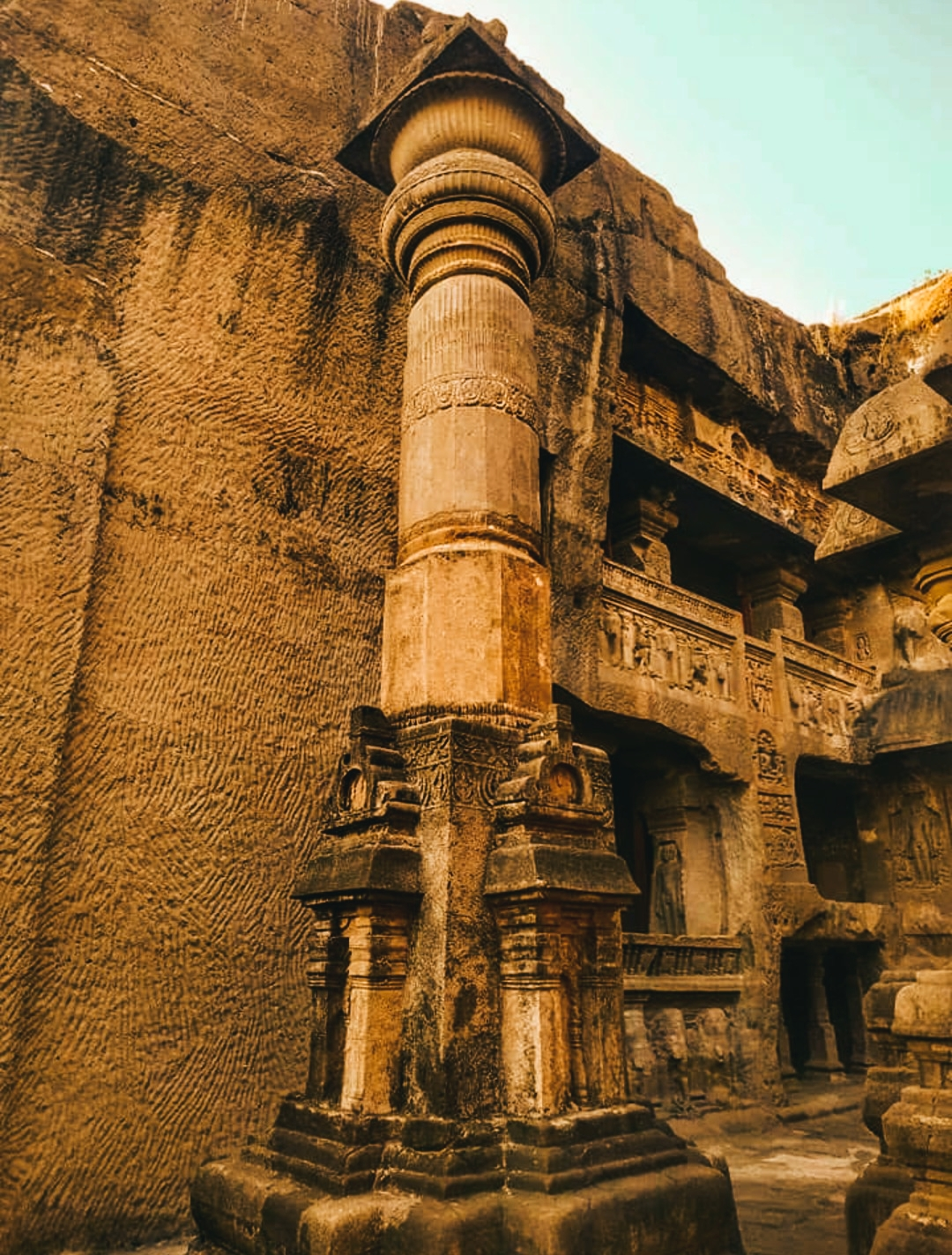
Manastambha Rashtrakuta Monuments

Chronicles mention more castes than the four commonly known castes in the Hindu social system, some as many as seven castes. Al-Biruni, the famed 10th century Persian / central Asian Indologist mentions sixteen castes including the four basic castes of Brahmins, Kshatriya, Vaishya and Sudras. The Zakaya or Lahud caste consisted of communities specialising in dance and acrobatics. People in the professions of sailing, hunting, weaving, cobblery, basket making and fishing belonged to specific castes or subcastes. The Antyajas caste provided many menial services to the wealthy. Brahmins enjoyed the highest status in Rashtrakuta society; only those Kshatriyas in the Sat-Kshatriya sub-caste (noble Kshatriyas) were higher in status.

The careers of Brahmins usually related to education, the judiciary, astrology, mathematics, poetry and philosophy or the occupation of hereditary administrative posts. Also Brahmins increasingly practised non-Brahminical professions (agriculture, trade in betel nuts and martial posts). Capital punishment, although widespread, was not given to the royal Kshatriya sub-castes or to Brahmins found guilty of heinous crimes (as the killing of a Brahmin in medieval Hindu India was itself considered a heinous crime). As an alternate punishment to enforce the law a Brahmin's right hand and left foot was severed, leaving that person disabled.

By the 9th century, kings from all the four castes had occupied the highest seat in the monarchical system in Hindu India. Admitting Kshatriyas to Vedic schools along with Brahmins was customary, but the children of the Vaishya and Shudra castes were not allowed. Landownership by people of all castes is recorded in inscriptions Intercaste marriages in the higher castes were only between highly placed Kshatriya girls and Brahmin boys, but was relatively frequent among other castes. Intercaste functions were rare and dining together between people of various castes was avoided.

Joint families were the norm but legal separations between brothers and even father and son have been recorded in inscriptions. Women and daughters had rights over property and land as there are inscriptions recording the sale of land by women. The arranged marriage system followed a strict policy of early marriage for women. Among Brahmins, boys married at or below 16 years of age and the brides chosen for them were 12 or younger. This age policy was not strictly followed by other castes. Sati (a custom in which a dead man's widow would immolate herself on her husband's funeral pyre) was practised but the few examples noted in inscriptions were mostly in the royal families. The system of shaving the heads of widows was infrequent as epigraphs note that widows were allowed to grow their hair but decorating it was discouraged. The remarriage of a widow was rare among the upper castes and more accepted among the lower castes.

In the general population men wore two simple pieces of cloth, a loose garment on top and a garment worn like a dhoti for the lower part of the body. Only kings could wear turbans, a practice that spread to the masses much later. Dancing was a popular entertainment and inscriptions speak of royal women being charmed by dancers, both male and female, in the king's palace. Devadasis (girls were "married" to a deity or temple) were often present in temples. Other recreational activities included attending animal fights of the same or different species. The Atakur inscription (hero stone, virgal) was made for the favourite hound of the feudatory Western Ganga King Butuga II that died fighting a wild boar in a hunt. There are records of game preserves for hunting by royalty. Astronomy and astrology were well developed as subjects of study, and there were many superstitious beliefs such as catching a snake alive proved a woman's chastity. Old persons suffering from incurable diseases preferred to end their lives by drowning in the sacred waters of a pilgrim site or by a ritual burning.

=== Literature ===
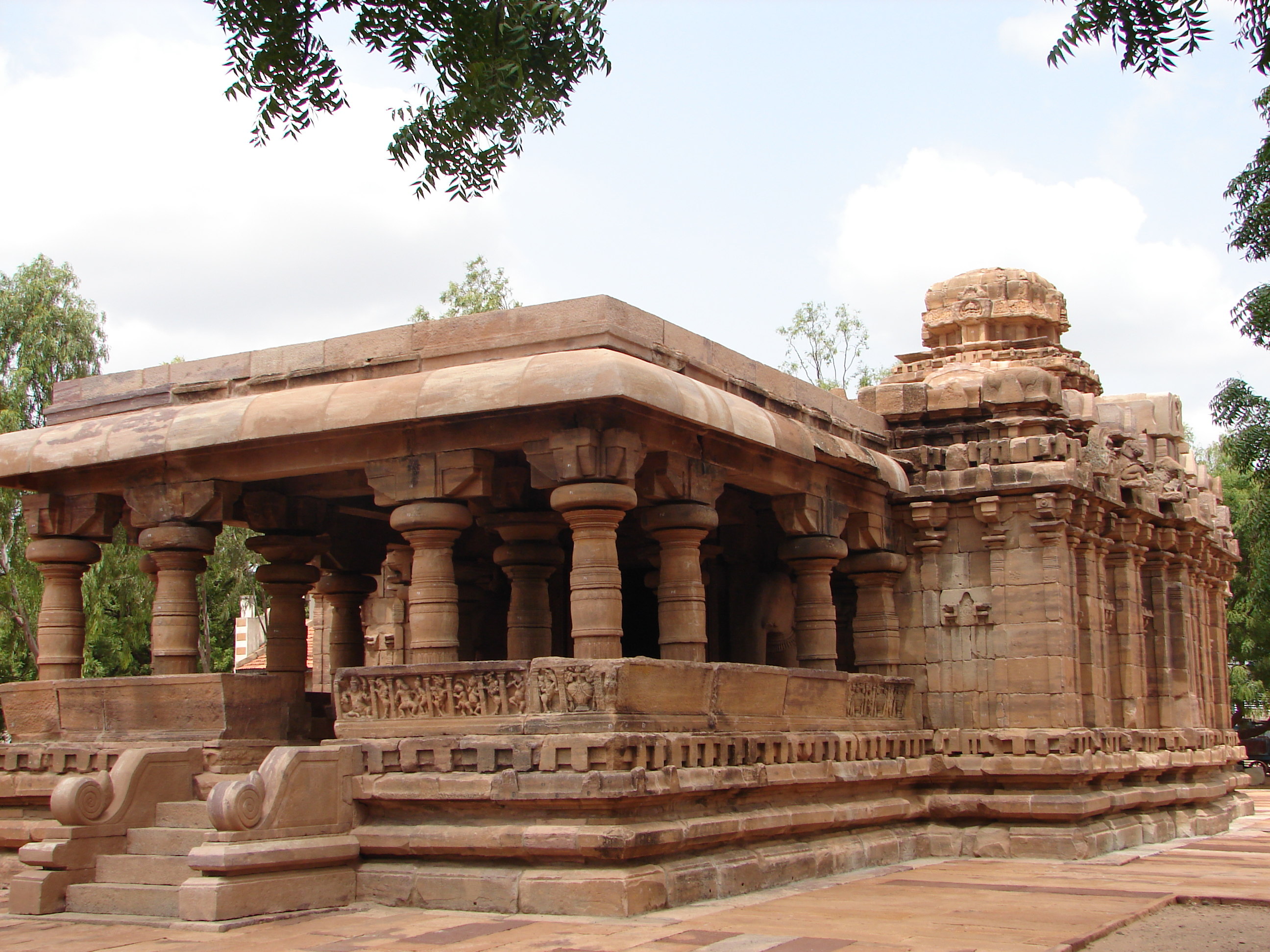
Jain Narayana temple at Pattadakal, Karnataka

Kannada became more prominent as a literary language during the Rashtrakuta rule with its script and literature showing remarkable growth, dignity and productivity. This period effectively marked the end of the classical Prakrit and Sanskrit era. Court poets and royalty created eminent works in Kannada and Sanskrit that spanned such literary forms as prose, poetry, rhetoric, the Jain epics and the life history of tirthankars. Bilingual writers such as Asaga gained fame, and noted scholars such as the Mahaviracharya wrote on pure mathematics in the court of King Amoghavarsha I.

Kavirajamarga (850) by King Amoghavarsha I is the earliest available book on rhetoric and poetics in Kannada, though it is evident from this book that native styles of Kannada composition had already existed in previous centuries. Kavirajamarga is a guide to poets (Kavishiksha) that aims to standardise these various styles. The book refers to early Kannada prose and poetry writers such as Durvinita, perhaps the 6th-century monarch of Western Ganga dynasty.

The Jain writer Adikavi Pampa, widely regarded as one of the most influential Kannada writers, became famous for Adipurana (941). Written in champu (mixed prose-verse style) style, it is the life history of the first Jain tirthankara Rishabhadeva. Pampa's other notable work was Vikramarjuna Vijaya (941), the author's version of the Hindu epic, Mahabharata, with Arjuna as the hero. Also called Pampa Bharata, it is a eulogy of the writer's patron, King Chalukya Arikeseri of Vemulawada (a Rashtrakuta feudatory), comparing the king's virtues favourably to those of Arjuna. Pampa demonstrates such a command of classical Kannada that scholars over the centuries have written many interpretations of his work.

Another notable Jain writer in Kannada was Sri Ponna, patronised by King Krishna III and famed for Shantipurana, his account of the life of Shantinatha, the 16th Jain tirthankara. He earned the title Ubhaya Kavichakravathi (supreme poet in two languages) for his command over both Kannada and Sanskrit. His other writings in Kannada were Bhuvanaika-ramaabhyudaya, Jinaksharamale and Gatapratyagata. Adikavi Pampa and Sri Ponna are called "gems of Kannada literature".

A stanza from the 9th century Kannada classic Kavirajamarga, praising the people for their literary skills

Prose works in Sanskrit was prolific during this era as well. Important mathematical theories and axioms were postulated by Mahaviracharya, a native of Gulbarga, who belonged to the Karnataka mathematical tradition and was patronised by King Amoghavarsha I. His greatest contribution was Ganitasarasangraha, a writing in 9 chapters. Somadevasuri of 950 wrote in the court of Arikesari II, a feudatory of Rashtrakuta Krishna III in Vemulavada. He was the author of Yasastilaka champu, Nitivakyamrita and other writings. The main aim of the champu writing was to propagate Jain tenets and ethics. The second writing reviews the subject matter of Arthashastra from the standpoint of Jain morals in a clear and pithy manner. Ugraditya, a Jain ascetic from Hanasoge in the modern Mysore district wrote a medical treatise called Kalyanakaraka. He delivered a discourse in the court of Amoghavarsha I encouraging abstinence from animal products and alcohol in medicine.

Trivikrama was a noted scholar in the court of King Indra III. His classics were Nalachampu (915), the earliest in champu style in Sanskrit, Damayanti Katha, Madalasachampu and Begumra plates. Legend has it that Goddess Saraswati helped him in his effort to compete with a rival in the king's court. Jinasena was the spiritual preceptor and guru of Amoghavarsha I. A theologian, his contributions are Dhavala and Jayadhavala (written with another theologian Virasena). These writings are named after their patron king who was also called Athishayadhavala. Other contributions from Jinasena were Adipurana, later completed by his disciple Gunabhadra, Harivamsha and Parshvabhyudaya.

=== Architecture ===
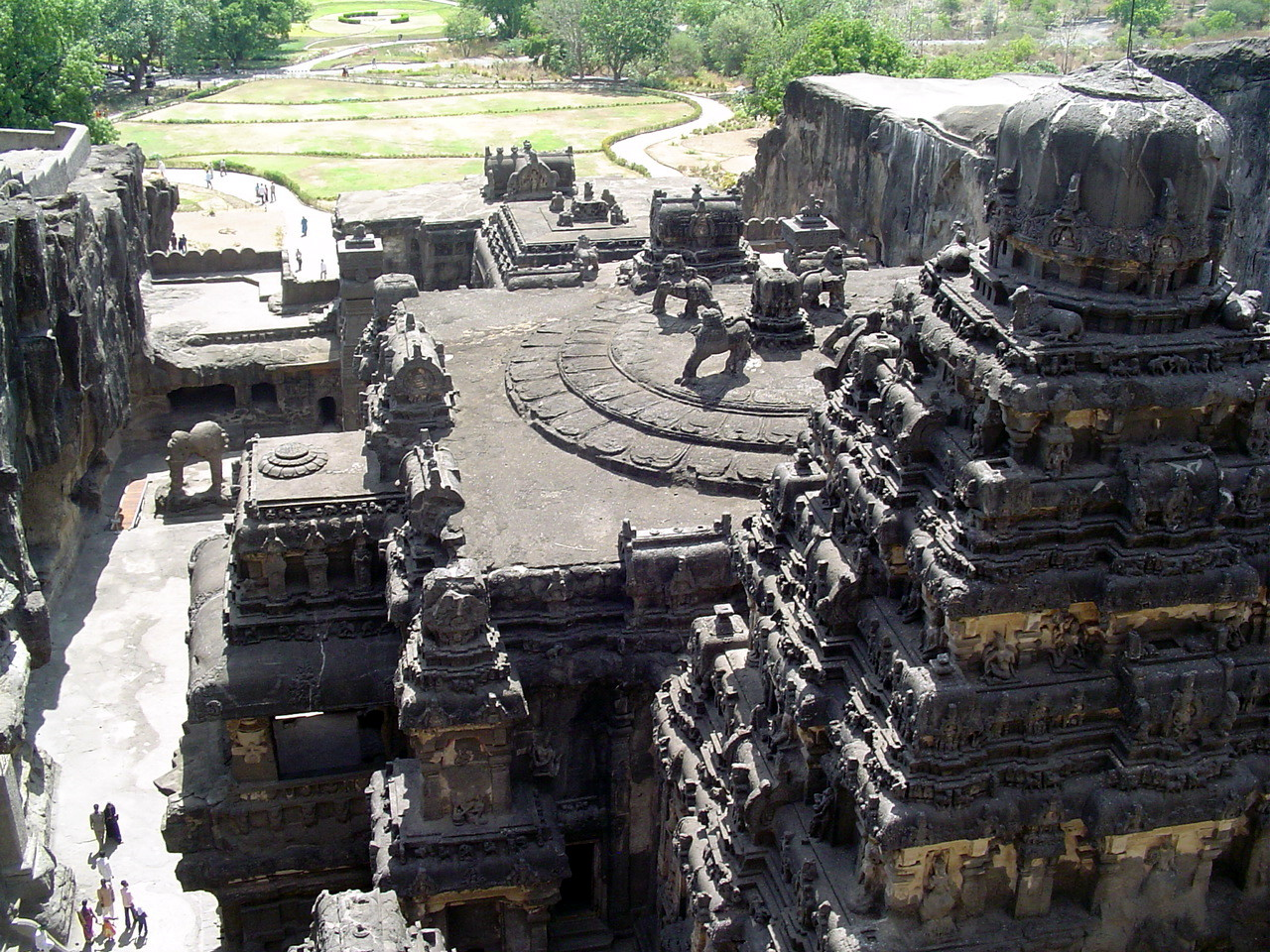
Kailasanath Temple at Ellora, Maharashtra

The Rashtrakutas contributed much to the architectural heritage of the Deccan. Art historian Adam Hardy categorises their building activity into three schools: Ellora, around Badami, Aihole and Pattadakal, and at Sirval near Gulbarga. The Rashtrakuta contributions to art and architecture are reflected in the splendid rock-cut cave temples at Ellora and Elephanta, areas also occupied by Jain monks, located in present-day Maharashtra. The Ellora site was originally part of a complex of 34 Buddhist caves probably created in the first half of the 6th century whose structural details show Pandyan influence. Cave temples occupied by Hindus are from later periods.

The Rashtrakutas renovated these Buddhist caves and re-dedicated the rock-cut shrines. Amoghavarsha I espoused Jainism and there are five Jain cave temples at Ellora ascribed to his period. The most extensive and sumptuous of the Rashtrakuta works at Ellora is their creation of the monolithic Kailasanath Temple, a splendid achievement confirming the "Balhara" status as "one among the four principal Kings of the world". The walls of the temple have marvellous sculptures from Hindu mythology including Ravana, Shiva and Parvathi while the ceilings have paintings.

The Kailasanath Temple project was commissioned by King Krishna I after the Rashtrakuta rule had spread into South India from the Deccan. The architectural style used is Karnata Dravida according to Adam Hardy. It does not contain any of the Shikharas common to the Nagara style and was built on the same lines as the Virupaksha temple at Pattadakal in Karnataka. According to art historian Vincent Smith, the achievement at the Kailasanath temple is considered an architectural consummation of the monolithic rock-cut temple and deserves to be considered one of the wonders of the world. According to art historian Percy Brown, as an accomplishment of art, the Kailasanath temple is considered an unrivalled work of rock architecture, a monument that has always excited and astonished travellers.

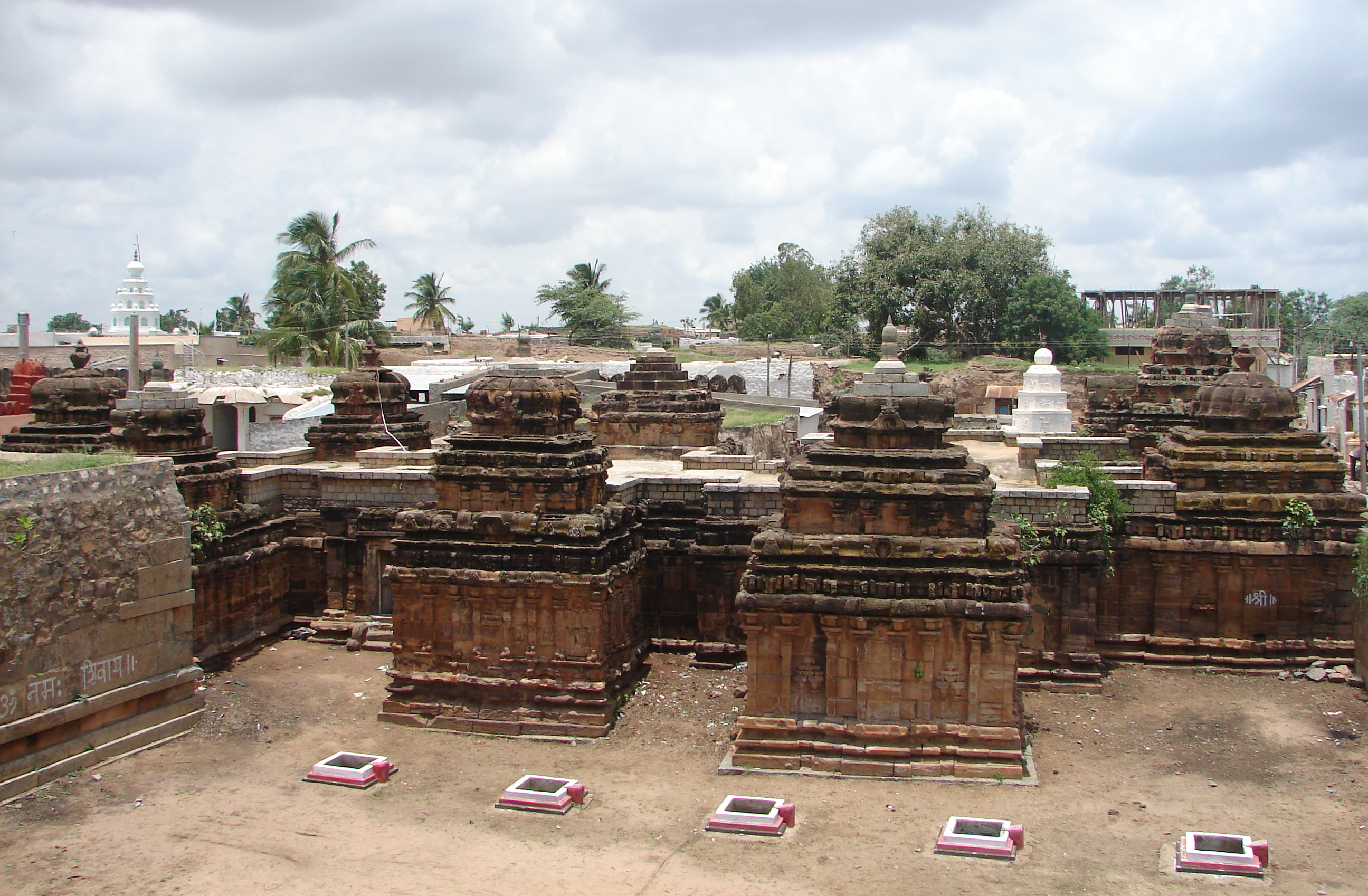
Dravidian style architecture. Top view of Navalinga Temples at Kuknur, Karnataka

While some scholars have claimed the architecture at Elephanta is attributable to the Kalachuri, others claim that it was built during the Rashtrakuta period. Some of the sculptures such as Nataraja and Sadashiva excel in beauty and craftsmanship even that of the Ellora sculptures. Famous sculptures at Elephanta include Ardhanarishvara and Maheshamurthy. The latter, a three faced bust of Lord Shiva, is 25 feet (8 m) tall and considered one of the finest pieces of sculpture in India. It is said that, in the world of sculpture, few works of art depicting a divinity are as balanced.

In Karnataka their most famous temples are the Kashivishvanatha temple and the Jain Narayana temple at Pattadakal, a UNESCO World Heritage site. Other well-known temples are the Parameshwara temple at Konnur, Brahmadeva temple at Savadi, the Settavva, Kontigudi II, Jadaragudi and Ambigeragudi temples at Aihole, Mallikarjuna temple at Ron, Andhakeshwara temple at Huli (Hooli), Someshwara temple at Sogal, Jain temples at Lokapura, Navalinga temple at Kuknur, Kumaraswamy temple at Sandur, numerous temples at Shirival in Gulbarga, and the Trikuteshwara temple at Gadag which was later expanded by Kalyani Chalukyas. Archeological study of these temples show some have the stellar (multigonal) plan later to be used profusely by the Hoysalas at Belur and Halebidu. One of the richest traditions in Indian architecture took shape in the Deccan during this time which Adam Hardy calls Karnata dravida style as opposed to traditional Dravida style.

=== Language ===
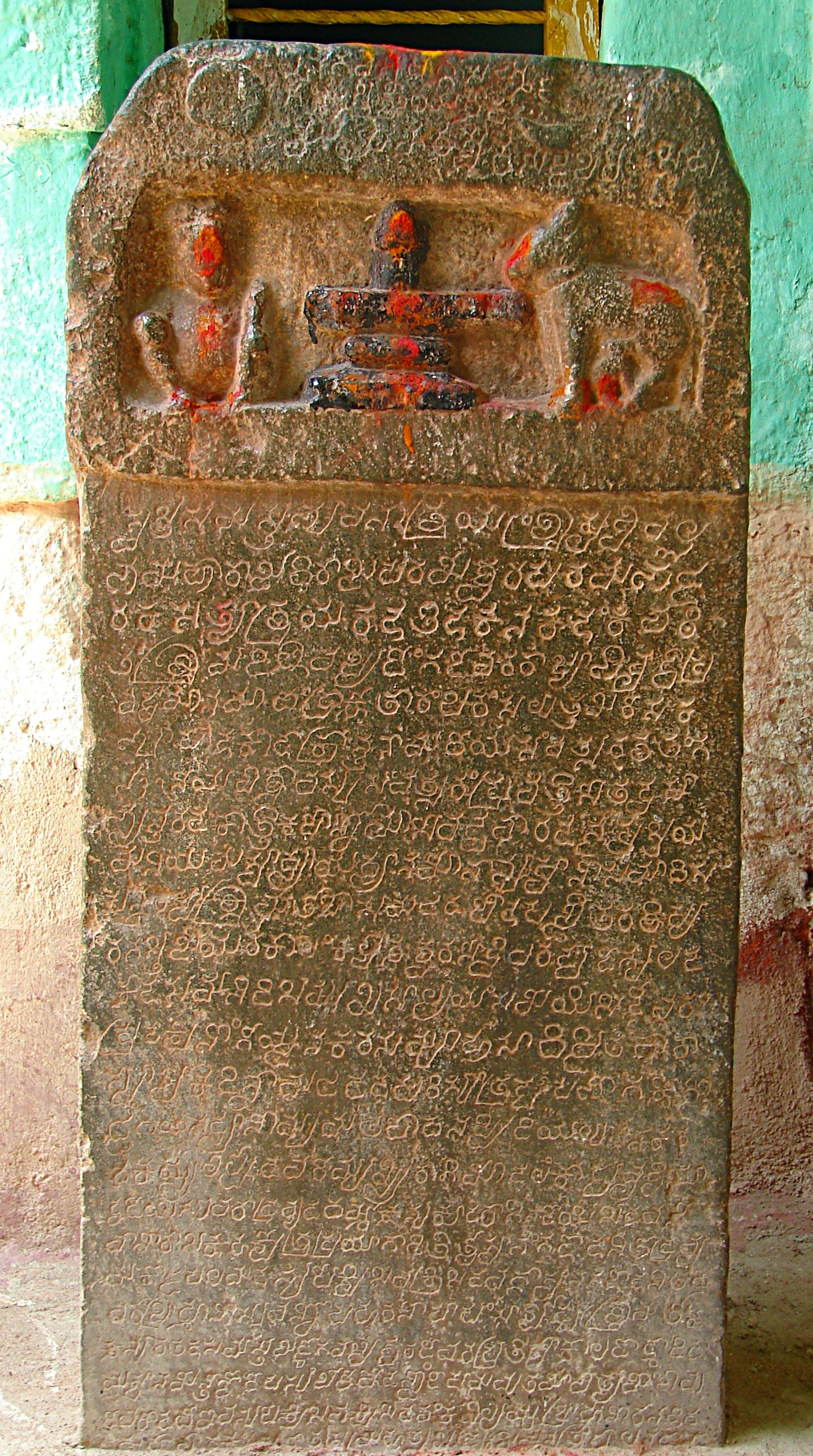
9th century Old Kannada inscription at Navalinga temple in Kuknur, Karnataka

With the ending of the Gupta dynasty in northern India in the early 6th century, major changes began taking place in the Deccan south of the Vindyas and in the southern regions of India. These changes were not only political but also linguistic and cultural. The royal courts of peninsular India (outside of Tamilakam) interfaced between the increasing use of the local Kannada language and the expanding Sanskritic culture. Inscriptions, including those that were bilingual, demonstrate the use of Kannada as the primary administrative language in conjunction with Sanskrit. Government archives used Kannada for recording pragmatic information relating to grants of land. The local language formed the desi (popular) literature while literature in Sanskrit was more marga (formal). Educational institutions and places of higher learning (ghatikas) taught in Sanskrit, the language of the learned Brahmins, while Kannada increasingly became the speech of personal expression of devotional closeness of a worshipper to a private deity. The patronage Kannada received from rich and literate Jains eventually led to its use in the devotional movements of later centuries.

Contemporaneous literature and inscriptions show that Kannada was not only popular in the modern Karnataka region but had spread further north into present day southern Maharashtra and to the northern Deccan by the 8th century. Kavirajamarga, the work on poetics, refers to the entire region between the Kaveri River and the Godavari River as "Kannada country". Higher education in Sanskrit included the subjects of Veda, Vyakarana (grammar), Jyotisha (astronomy and astrology), Sahitya (literature), Mimansa (Exegesis), Dharmashastra (law), Puranas (ritual), and Nyaya (logic). An examination of inscriptions from this period shows that the Kavya (classical) style of writing was popular. The awareness of the merits and defects in inscriptions by the archivists indicates that even they, though mediocre poets, had studied standard classical literature in Sanskrit. An inscription in Kannada by King Krishna III, written in a poetic Kanda metre, has been found as far away as Jabalpur in modern Madhya Pradesh. Kavirajamarga, a work on poetics in Kannada by Amoghavarsha I, shows that the study of poetry was popular in the Deccan during this time. Trivikrama's Sanskrit writing, Nalachampu, is perhaps the earliest in the champu style from the Deccan.

Kailasa temple, Ellora

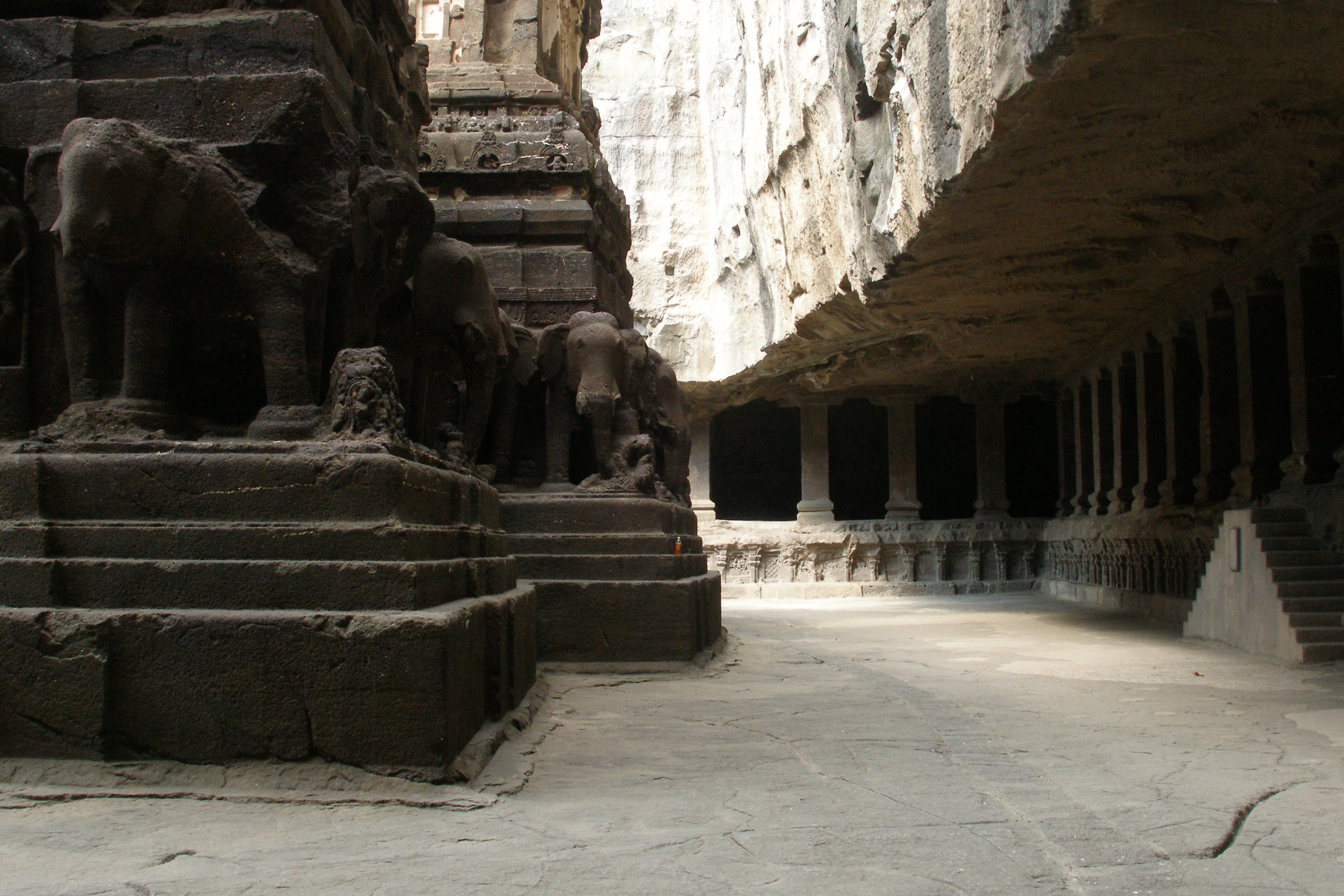
Interior and arcades

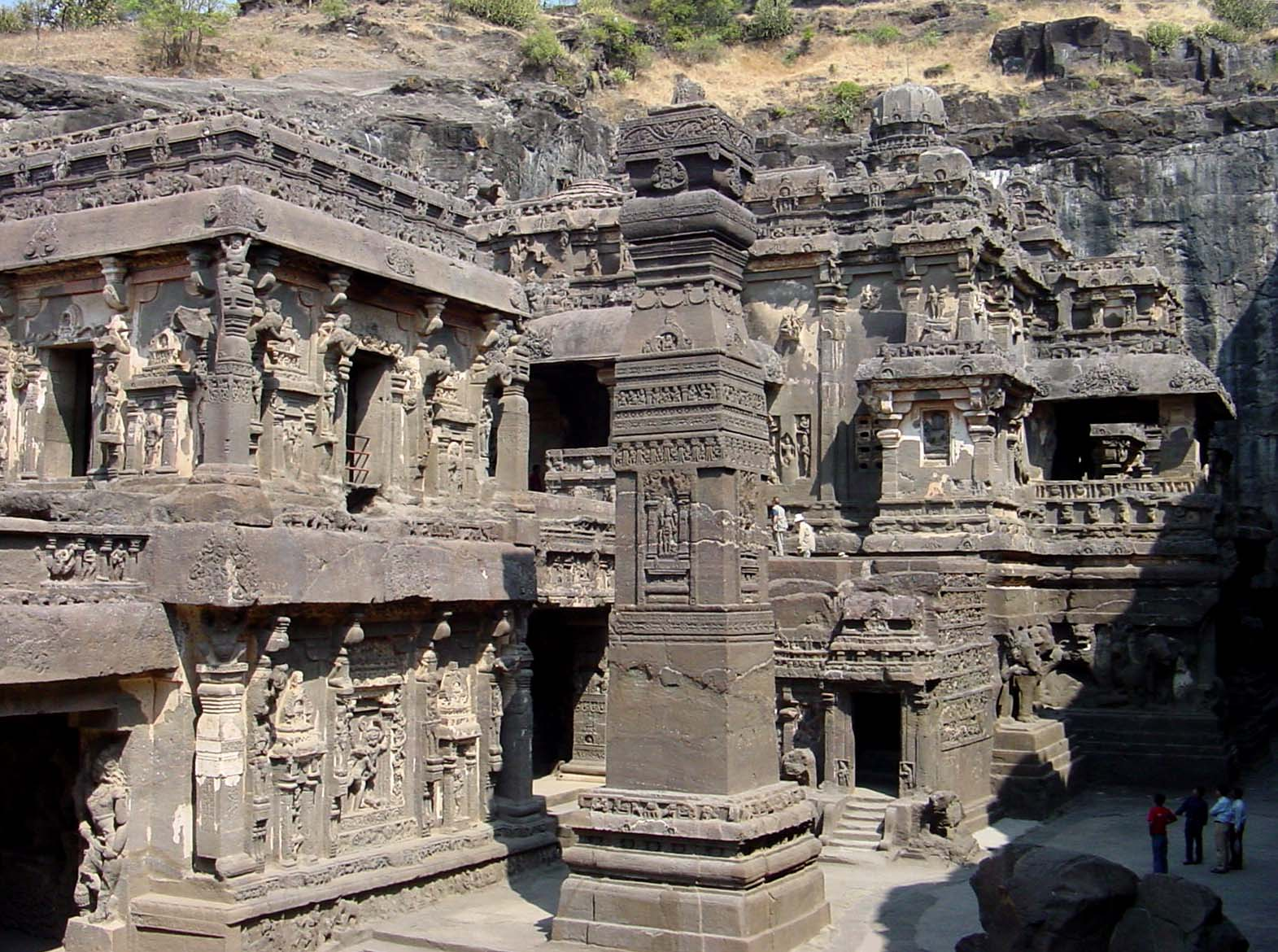
Kailasa temple, is one of the largest rock-cut ancient Hindu temples located in Ellora.

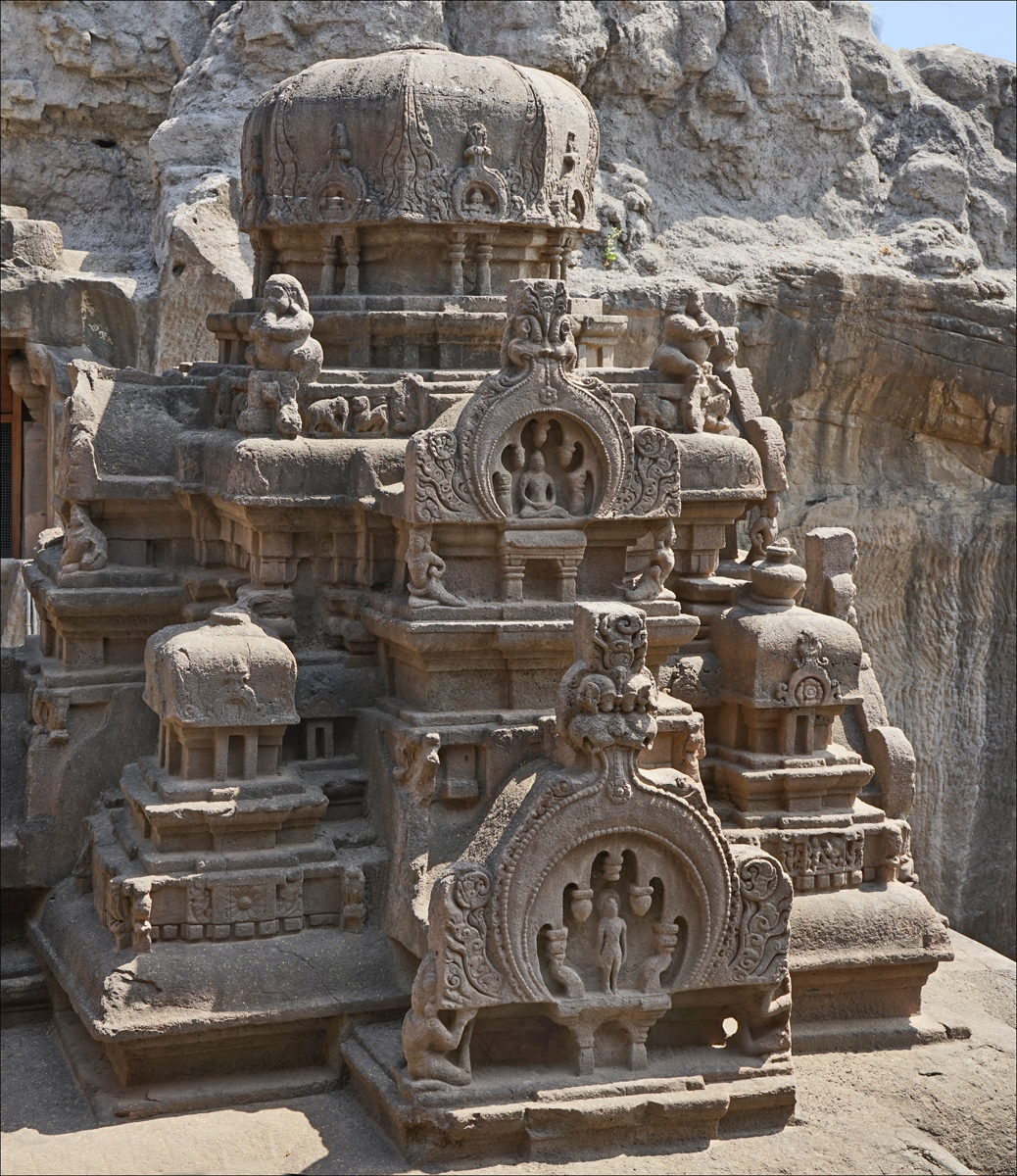
Shikhara of Indra Sabha at Ellora.

== List of rulers ==
The Rashtrakuta monarchs' titles were Maharajadhiraja, Paramabhattaraka, etc.

List of Rashtrakuta dynasty rulers
S. no	Ruler	Reign (ca.)
1	Dantidurga	753–756
2	Krishna I	756–774
3	Govinda II	774–780
4	Dhruva with Sila Mahadevi	780–793
5	Govinda III	793–814
6	Amoghavarsha	814–878
7	Krishna II	878–914
8	Indra III	914–929
9	Amoghavarsha II	929–930
10	Govinda IV	930–936
11	Amoghavarsha III	936–939
12	Krishna III	939–967
13	Khottiga	967–972
14	Karka II	972–973
15	Indra IV	973–982

== See also ==
- Gadag
- Kalyani Chalukyas
- Kuknur
- Pattadakal
- Prithvi-vallabha (title)

== Notes ==
Timeline and cultural period	Indus plain (Punjab-Sapta Sindhu-Gujarat)	Gangetic Plain			Central India	Southern India
Timeline and cultural period	Indus plain (Punjab-Sapta Sindhu-Gujarat)	Upper Gangetic Plain (Ganga-Yamuna doab)	Middle Gangetic Plain	Lower Gangetic Plain	Central India	Southern India
IRON AGE
Culture	Late Vedic Period	Late Vedic Period; Painted Grey Ware culture	Late Vedic Period; Northern Black Polished Ware		Pre-history	
6th century BCE	Gandhara	Kuru-Panchala	Magadha		Adivasi (tribes)	Assaka
Culture	Persian-Greek influences	"Second Urbanisation"; Rise of Shramana movements Jainism - Buddhism - Ājīvika - Yoga			Pre-history	
5th century BCE	(Persian conquests)		Shaishunaga dynasty		Adivasi (tribes)	Assaka
4th century BCE	(Greek conquests)	Nanda empire				
HISTORICAL AGE
Culture	Spread of Buddhism				Pre-history	
3rd century BCE	Maurya Empire					Satavahana dynasty Sangam period (300 BCE – 200 CE); Early Cholas; Early Pandyan kingdom Cheras
Culture	Preclassical Hinduism (Note: Michaels (2004) p.39) - "Hindu Synthesis" (Note: Hiltebeitel (2002)) (ca. 200 BCE - 300 CE) (Note: Michaels (2004) p.39) (Note: Hiltebeitel (2002)); Epics - Puranas - Ramayana - Mahabharata - Bhagavad Gita - Brahma Sutras - Smarta Tradition; Mahayana Buddhism					
2nd century BCE	Indo-Greek Kingdom		Shunga Empire; Maha-Meghavahana Dynasty			Satavahana dynasty Sangam period (300 BCE – 200 CE); Early Cholas; Early Pandyan kingdom Cheras
1st century BCE	Indo-Greek Kingdom		Shunga Empire; Maha-Meghavahana Dynasty			Satavahana dynasty Sangam period (300 BCE – 200 CE); Early Cholas; Early Pandyan kingdom Cheras
1st century CE	Indo-Scythians; Indo-Parthians		Kuninda Kingdom			Satavahana dynasty Sangam period (300 BCE – 200 CE); Early Cholas; Early Pandyan kingdom Cheras
2nd century	Kushan Empire					Satavahana dynasty Sangam period (300 BCE – 200 CE); Early Cholas; Early Pandyan kingdom Cheras
3rd century	Kushano-Sasanian Kingdom; Western Satraps	Kushan Empire		Kamarupa kingdom	Adivasi (tribes)	Satavahana dynasty Sangam period (300 BCE – 200 CE); Early Cholas; Early Pandyan kingdom Cheras
Culture	"Golden Age of Hinduism"(ca. CE 320-650) (Note: Michaels (2004) p.40); Puranas - Kural; Co-existence of Hinduism and Buddhism					
4th century	Kidarites	Gupta Empire; Varman dynasty				Andhra Ikshvakus; Kalabhra dynasty Kadamba Dynasty; Western Ganga Dynasty
5th century	Hephthalite Empire	Alchon Huns				Vishnukundina; Kalabhra dynasty
6th century	Nezak Huns; Kabul Shahi; Maitraka				Adivasi (tribes)	Vishnukundina; Badami Chalukyas; Kalabhra dynasty
Culture	Late-Classical Hinduism (ca. CE 650-1100) (Note: Michaels (2004) p.41); Advaita Vedanta - Tantra; Decline of Buddhism in India					
7th century	Indo-Sassanids		Vakataka dynasty Empire of Harsha	Mlechchha dynasty	Adivasi (tribes)	Badami Chalukyas; Eastern Chalukyas; Pandyan kingdom (revival); Pallava
7th century	Karkota dynasty				Adivasi (tribes)	
8th century	Kabul Shahi	Pala Empire			Adivasi (tribes)	Eastern Chalukyas; Pandyan kingdom Kalachuri
9th century	Gurjara-Pratihara				Adivasi (tribes)	Rashtrakuta Empire; Eastern Chalukyas; Pandyan kingdom Medieval Cholas; Chera Perumals of Makkotai
10th century	Ghaznavids			Pala dynasty Kamboja-Pala dynasty	Adivasi (tribes)	Kalyani Chalukyas; Eastern Chalukyas; Medieval Cholas; Chera Perumals of Makkotai; Rashtrakuta
References and sources for table References Sources: Flood, Gavin D. (1996), An Introduction to Hinduism, Cambridge University Press; Hiltebeitel, Alf (2002), Hinduism. In: Joseph Kitagawa, "The Religious Traditions of Asia: Religion, History, and Culture", Routledge; Michaels, Axel (2004), Hinduism. Past and present, Princeton, New Jersey: Princeton University Press
