= List of Chalukya kings =

The Chalukya dynasty was a Classical Indian dynasty that ruled large parts of southern and central India between the 6th and the 12th centuries.

During this period, they ruled as three related yet individual dynasties. The earliest dynasty, known as the Badami Chalukyas, ruled from Vatapi (modern Badami) from the middle of the 6th century. After the death of Badami Chalukya ruler Pulakeshin II, the Eastern Chalukyas became an independent kingdom in the eastern Deccan. They ruled from Vengi until about the 11th century. The Western Chalukyas ruled from Kalyani (modern Basavakalyan) until the end of the 12th century.

- Badami Chalukya Empire (c. 543–753 CE)

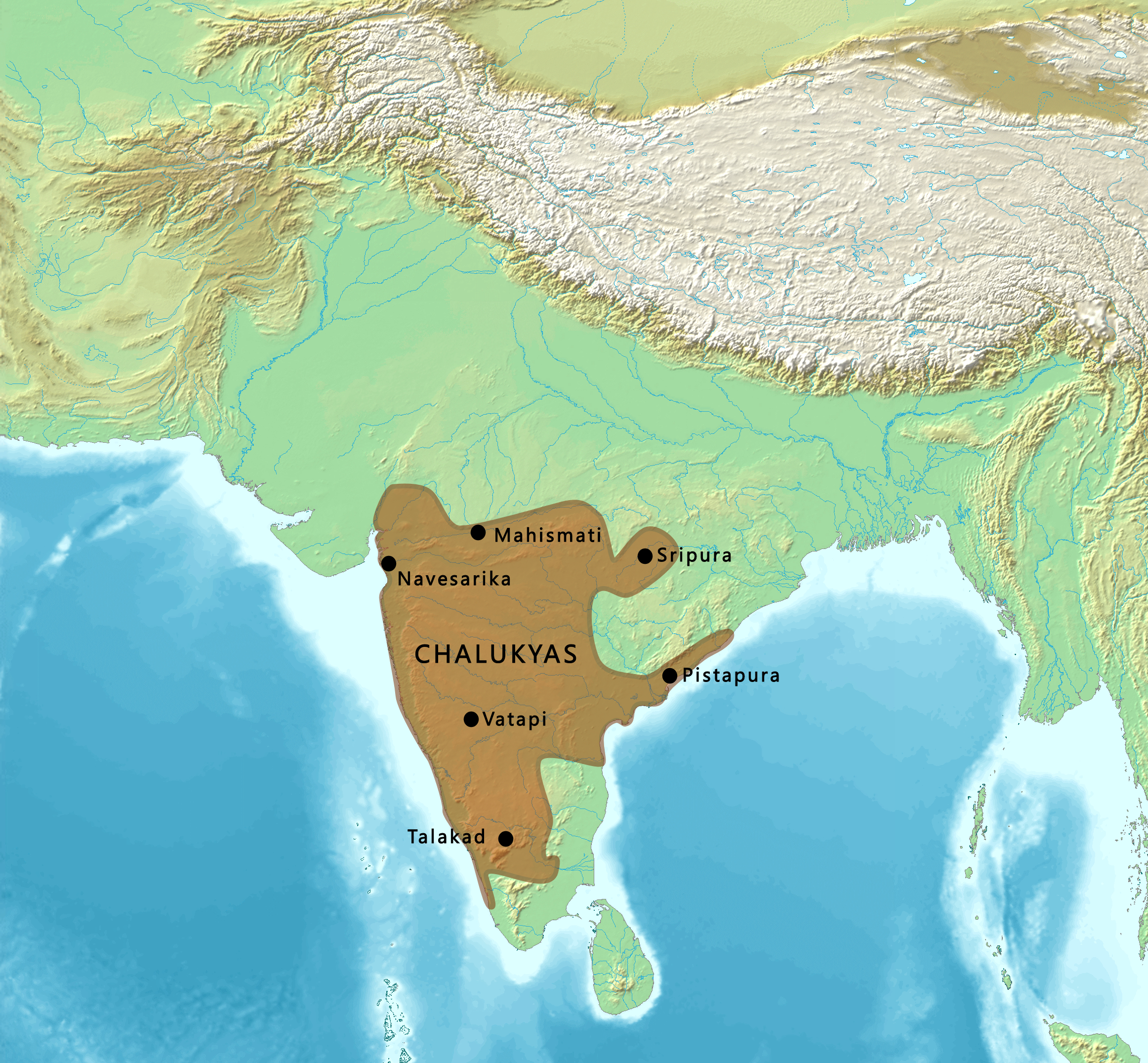
Greatest extent of the Badami Chalukya Empire

- Eastern Chalukya Empire (c. 624–1189 CE)

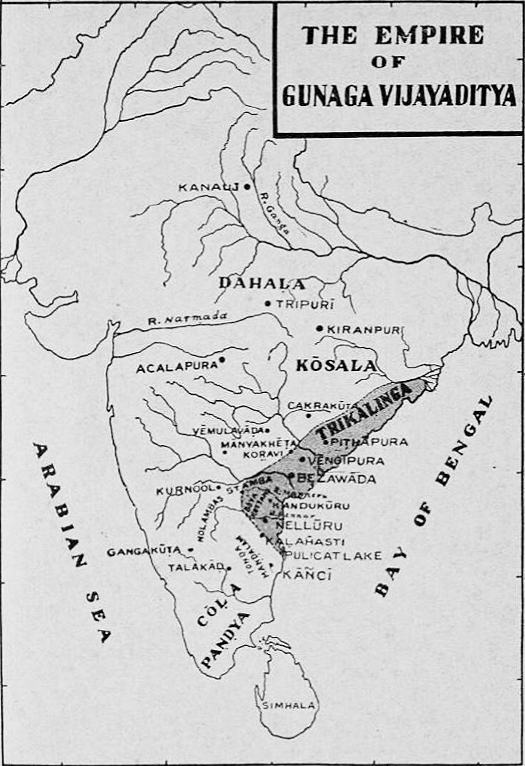
Greatest extent of the Eastern Chalukya Empire

- Western Chalukya Empire (c. 957–1184 CE)

Greatest extent of the Western Chalukya Empire

== List of kings ==
Ruler		Reign	Capital
Jayasimha I		500–520	Badami
Ranaraga		520–540	Badami
Pulakeshin I		540–567	Badami
Kirtivarman I		567–592	Badami
Mangalesha		592–610	Badami
Pulakeshin II		610–642	Badami
Kubja Vishnuvardhana I		615/24–641	Vengi (Eastern)
Jayasimha I (II)		641–673	Vengi (Eastern)
Adityavarman		642–645	Badami
Abhinavaditya		645–646	Badami
Chandraditya		646–649	Badami
Regency of Vijaya-Bhattarika (649–655)			Regent for her minor son. She was deposed by her brother-in-law.
A son of Chandraditya		649–655	Badami
Satyashraya		c.650-675	Vemulavada
Vikramaditya I		655–680	Badami
Indra Bhattaraka		673	Vengi (Eastern)
Vishnuvardhana II		673–682	Vengi (Eastern)
Prithvipathi		c.675-700	Vemulavada
Vinayaditya		680–696	Badami
Mangi Yuvaraja		682–706	Vengi (Eastern)
Vijayaditya I		696–733	Badami
Maharaja		c.700-725	Vemulavada
Jayasimha III		706–718	Vengi (Eastern)
Kokkli		718–719	Vengi (Eastern)
Vishnuvardhana III		719–755	Vengi (Eastern)
Rajaditya		c.725-750	Vemulavada
Vikramaditya II		733–746	Badami
Kirtivarman II Rahappa		746- 757	Badami
Vinayaditya Yuddhamalla I		c.750-775	Vemulavada
Vijayaditya I (II)		755–772	Vengi (Eastern)
Vishnuvardhana IV		755–808	Vengi (Eastern)
Arikesari I		c.775-800	Vemulavada
Narasimha I		c.800-825	Vemulavada
Vijayaditya II (III)		808–847	Vengi (Eastern)
Yuddhamalla II		c.825-850	Vemulavada
Kali Vishnuvardhana V		847–849	Vengi (Eastern)
Vijayaditya III (IV)	Brothers, ruled together.	849–892	Vengi (Eastern)
Vikramaditya I (III)	Brothers, ruled together.	849–892	Vengi (Eastern)
Yuddhamalla I	Brothers, ruled together.	849–892	Vengi (Eastern)
Baddega I Soladaganda		c.850-895	Vemulavada
Bhima I		892–921	Vengi (Eastern)
Yuddhamalla III		c.895-915	Vemulavada
Narasimha II		c.915-930	Vemulavada
Vijayaditya IV (V)		921	Vengi (Eastern)
Amma I	Probably brothers, ruled jointly.	921–927	Vengi (Eastern)
Vishnuvardhana VI	Probably brothers, ruled jointly.	921–927	Vengi (Eastern)
Vijayaditya V (VI)		927	Vengi (Eastern)
Tadapa		927	Vengi (Eastern)
Vikramaditya II (IV)		927–928	Vengi (Eastern)
Bhima II		928–929	Vengi (Eastern)
Yuddhamalla II		929–935	Vengi (Eastern)
Arikesari II		c.930-941	Vemulavada
Bhima III		935–947	Vengi (Eastern)
Baddega II	Ruled jointly.	941-946	Vemulavada
Vagaraja	Ruled jointly.	941-950	Vemulavada
Arikesari III		946/950-968	Vemulavada
Annexed to the Western Chalukya Empire
Amma II		947–970	Vengi (Eastern)
Danarnava		970–973	Vengi (Eastern)
Tailapa II Ahvamalla		973–997	Kalyani (Western)
Jata Choda Bhima		973–999	Vengi (Eastern)
Satyashraya		997–1008	Kalyani (Western)
Shaktivarman I		999–1011	Vengi (Eastern)
Vikramaditya V		1008–1015	Kalyani (Western)
Vimaladitya		1011–1018	Vengi (Eastern)
Jayasimha II (III)		1015–1043	Kalyani (Western)
Rajaraja Narendra		1018–1061	Vengi (Eastern)
Rajaraja had support in the throne from the Cholas, whose influence grew significantly. He supported Cholas against his cousins, the Western Chalukyas. His own son managed to succeed in the Chola Empire, in 1070, as Kulottunga I, beginning the Later Cholas period, in which the Chola Empire was ruled by a branch of the Eastern Chalukyas renamed Chola, which inherited Narendra's kingdom. It's possible, then, that the following rulers were governors for the Chola Emperor ruling Eastern Chalukya territory: Shaktivarman II (1061–1062); Vijayaditya VII (1062–1075), also son of Vimaladitya, but half-brother of Rajaraja Narendra. Ascended with support from Western Chalukyas.; Rajaraja (1075–1079); Vishuvardhana VII (1079–1102), last known Chalukya ruler of Vengi.
Annexed to the Chola Empire (1061-1118); Annexed to the Western Chalukya Empire (since 1118)
Someshvara I Trilokyamalla		1042–1068	Kalyani (Western)
Someshvara II Bhuvanaikamalla		1068–1076	Kalyani (Western)
Vikramaditya VI Tribhuvanamalla		1076–1126	Kalyani (Western)
Someshvara III		1126–1138	Kalyani (Western)
Jagadhekamalla II		1138–1151	Kalyani (Western)
Tailapa III		1151–1164	Kalyani (Western)
Jagadhekamalla III		1164–1183	Kalyani (Western)
Someshvara IV		1183–1200	Kalyani (Western)
Annexed to the Seuna, Hoysala and the Kakatiya dynasties

== See also ==
- Chalukya dynasty
- Western Chalukya Empire
- List of Hindu empires and dynasties
