= Gurjaras of Lata =

Classical Indian Kingdom (580-740)

Gurjara of Lata
- c. 430 CE–c. 738 CE
- Capital: Nándípurí (Nandod); Bhrigukacchapa (Bharuch)
- Common languages: Prakrit
- Religion: Sun-worshipers, Shaivism
- Government: Monarchy
- History
  - Established: c. 430 CE
  - Disestablished: c. 738 CE
Preceded by	Succeeded by
Kalachuris of Mahishmati	Rashtrakuta Empire
- Today part of: India

The Gurjaras of Lata, also known as Gurjaras of Nandipuri or Bharuch Gurjaras, were a dynasty which ruled Lata region (now South Gujarat) of India as a feudatory of different dynasties from c. 430 CE to c. 738 CE.

== Sources of information ==
All the available information regarding the Bharuch Gurjaras comes from copperplates, all obtained from South Gujarat. Like the grants of the contemporary Chalukyas all the genuine copperplates are dated in the Traikúṭaka era which begins in 249–50 CE. The Gurjara capital seems to have been Nāndīpurī or Nāndor, the modern Nandod near Bharuch. Two of their grants issue Nāndīpurītaḥ that is 'from Nāndīpurī’, a phrase which seems to show the place named was the capital since in other Gurjara grants the word vāsaka or camp occurs.

== Rule ==
These copperplates limit the regular Gurjara territory to the Bharuch district between the Mahi and the Narmada rivers, though at times their power extended north to Kheḍā and south to the Tāpti river.

Though the Gurjaras held a considerable territory in South Gujarat their plates seem to show they were not independent rulers. The general titles are either Samadhigata-panchamahāśabada 'He who has attained the five great titles,’ or Sāmanta Feudatory. In one instance Jayabhaṭa III who was probably a powerful ruler is called Sāmantādhipati Lord of Feudatories. It is hard to say to what suzerain these Bharuch Gurjaras acknowledged fealty. Latterly they seem to have accepted the Chalukyas on the south as their overlords. But during the greater part of their existence they may have been feudatory of the Maitraka dynasty.

== History ==
The origin of dynasty is not known. It probably originated from the neighboring dynasty, Gurjaras of Mandavyapura or Bhinmala.

=== Early history ===
A grant made by Nirihullaka, the chieftain of a forest tribe in the lower valley of the Narmada, shows that towards the end of the sixth century CE that region was occupied by forest tribes who acknowledged the supremacy of the Kalachuri dynasty; a fact which accounts for the use of the Chedi or Traikúṭaka era in South Gujarāt. Nirihullaka names with respect a king Śaṅkaraṇa, identified with Śaṅkaragaṇa (r. c. 575-600 CE) of Kalachuri dynasty and the Gurjara conquest must be subsequent to this date. Another grant, which is only a fragment and contains no king's name, but which on the ground of date (Samvat 346 = 594–5 CE) and style may be safely attributed to the Gurjara dynasty, shows that the Gurjaras were established in the country within a few years of Śaṅkaragaṇa's probable date.

A still nearer approximation to the date of the Gurjara conquest is suggested by the change in the titles of Dharasena I of Maitraka dynasty, who in his grants of Saṃvat 252 (571 CE) calls himself Mahārāja, while in his grants of 269 and 270 (588 and 589 CE), he adds the title of Mahāsāmanta, which points to subjection by some foreign power between 571 and 588 CE. It seems highly probable that this power was that of the Gurjaras of Bhīnmāl; and that their successes therefore took place between 580 and 588 CE or about 585 CE.

=== Dadda III ===
The above-mentioned anonymous grant of the year 346 (CE 594–95) from Sankheda is ascribed with great probability to Dadda III. who is known from the two Kheḍā grants of his grandson Dadda IV. (C. 620–650 CE) to have “uprooted the Nāga” who may be the same as the forest tribes ruled by Nirihullaka (possibly later represented by the Nāikdās of the Panchmahāls and the Talabdas or Locals of Bharuch).

The northern limit of Dadda's kingdom seems to have been the Vindhya, as the grant of 380 (CE 628–29) says that the lands lying around the feet of the Vindhya were for his pleasure. At the same time it appears that part at least of Northern Gujarāt was ruled by the Mahāsāmanta Dharasena of Maitraka dynasty, who in Val. 270 (589–90 CE) granted a village in the āhāra (province) of Kheṭaka (Kheḍā). Dadda is always spoken of as the Sāmanta, which shows that while he lived his territory remained a part of the Gurjara kingdom of Bhīnmāl. Subsequently, North Gujarāt fell into the hands of the Mālava kings, to whom it belonged in Hiuen Tsiang’s time (c. 640 CE). In Tsiang's accounts, Po-lu-ka-cha-po (Bharigukacchapa or Bhrigukaccha, i.e., Bharuch) is mentioned. Dadda I. is mentioned in the two Kheḍā grants of his grandson as a worshipper of the sun: the fragmentary grant of 346 (594–95 CE) which is attributed to him gives no historical details.

=== Jayabhata II ===
Dadda III was succeeded by his son Jayabhaṭa II who is mentioned in the Kheḍā grants as a victorious and virtuous ruler, and appears from his title of Vītarāga the Passionless to have been a religious prince.

=== Dadda IV ===
Jayabhaṭa II. was succeeded by his son Dadda IV who bore the title of Praśāntarāga II, the Passion-calmed. Dadda was the donor of the two Kheḍā grants of 380 (628–29 CE) and 385 (633–34 CE), and a part of a grant made by his brother Raṇagraha in the year 391 (639–40 CE) has been recorded. Both of the Kheḍā grants relate to the gift of the village of Sirīshapadraka (Sisodra) in the Akrúreśvara (Ankleshwar) vishaya to certain Brāhmans of Jambusar and Bharuch. In Raṇagraha's grant the name of the village is lost.

Dadda IV’s own grants describe him as having attained the five great titles, and praise him in general terms: and both he and his brother Raṇagraha sign their grants as devout worshipers of the sun. Dadda IV heads the genealogy in the later grant of 456 (704–5 CE), which states that he protected "the lord of Valabhi [Dhruvasena II] who had been defeated by the great lord the illustrious Harshadeva." The event referred to must have been some expedition of Harsha of Kanauj (Vardhana dynasty) (607–648 CE), perhaps the campaign in which Harsha was defeated on the Narmada by Pulakeshin II of Chalukya dynasty (which took place before 634 CE). The protection given to the Valabhi king is perhaps referred to in the Kheḍā grants in the mention of "strangers and suppliants and people in distress." If this is the case the defeat of Valabhi took place before 628–29 CE, the date of the earlier of the Kheḍā grants. On the other hand, the phrase quoted is by no means decisive, and the fact that in Hiuen Tsiang's time Dhruvasena II of Valabhi was son-in-law of Harsha's son, makes it unlikely that Harsha should have been at war with him. It follows that the expedition referred to may have taken place in the reign of Dharasena IV who may have been the son of Dhruvasena by another wife than Harsha's granddaughter.

To Dadda IV's reign belongs Hiuen Tsiang's notice of the kingdom of Bharuch (C. 640 CE). He says "all their profit is from the sea" and describes the country as salt and barren, which is still true of large tracts in the west and twelve hundred years ago was probably the condition of a much larger area than at present. Hiuen Tsiang does not say that Broach was subject to any other kingdom, but it is clear from the fact that Dadda bore the five great titles that he was a mere feudatory. At this period the valuable port of Bharuch, from which all their profit was made, was a prize fought for by all the neighbouring powers. With the surrounding country of Lāṭa, Bharuch submitted to Pulakeśin II. (610–640 CE), it may afterwards have fallen to the Mālawa kings, to whom in Hiuen Tsiang's time (640 CE) both Kheḍā (K’i.e.-ch’a) and Ánandapura (Vadnagar) belonged; later it was subject to Valabhi, as Dharasena IV made a grant at Bharuch in VS 330 (649–50 CE).

The knowledge of the later Gurjaras is derived exclusively from two grants of Jayabhaṭa III dated respectively 456 (704–5 CE) and 486 (734–5 CE). The later of these two grants is imperfect, only the last plate having been preserved. The earlier grant of 456 (704–5 CE) shows that during the half century following the reign of Dadda IV the dynasty had ceased to call themselves Gurjaras, and had adopted a Purāṇic pedigree traced from Karna of Mahabharata. It also shows that from Dadda III onward the family were Śaivas instead of sun-worshipers.

=== Jayabhata II ===
The successor of Dadda IV was his son Jayabhaṭa III who is described as a warlike prince, but of whom no historical details are recorded.

=== Dadda V ===
Jayabhaṭa's son, Dadda V Bāhusahāya is described as waging wars with the great kings of the east and of the west (probably Mālava and Valabhi). He had received title of Bāhusahāya to for showing valour of his arms in fights with suzerain of east and west. He was Śaiva. Like his predecessors, Dadda V was not an independent ruler. He could claim only the five great titles, though no hint is given who was his suzerain. His immediate superior may have been Jayasimhavarma, who received the province of Lāṭa from his brother Vikramaditya I of Chalukya dynasty. During his rule Jayasimhavarma had defeated Vajjada between Mahi and Narmada rivers. Vajjada may be another name of Dadda V or another king of that name had invaded his state and was defeated by Jayasimhavarma.

=== Jayabhata IV ===
The son and successor of Dadda V was Jayabhaṭa IV whose two grants of 456 (704–5 CE) and 486 (734–5 CE) must belong respectively to the beginning and the end of his reign. He attained the five great titles, and was therefore a feudatory, probably of the Chālukyas: but his title of Mahāsāmantādhipati implies that he was a chief of importance. He is praised in vague terms, but the only historical event mentioned in his grants is a defeat of a Maitraka ruler of Valabhi, noted in the grant of 486 (734–5 CE). The Maitraka king referred to must be Śīlāditya IV (691 CE).

=== Ahirole ===
Jayabhata IV was succeeded by Ahirole. He ruled till c. 720 CE.

=== Jayabhata V ===
Ahirole's son Jayabhata V's copperplate states that he defeated the Arabs fighting for the Umayyad Caliphate at Valabhi, the capital of his probable overlords, the Maitrakas, in the year 735-36 CE. He assumed title of Mahasamanradhipati. He must be feudatory of Maitraka ruler Shiladitya IV or Shiladitya V as he had helped his suzerain Maitrakas in battle. Majumdar had suggested that he may have helped as a feudatory of Chalukyas. Bharuch may have finally destroyed by the Arabs and the Gurjara principality overtaken by them. The Arab were severely defeated and repulsed by Chalukya governor Avanijanashraya Pulakeshin in 738-39 at Navsari. He may have annexed the Gurjara kingdom to the Chalukya territory after evicting the Arabs. Alternatively, the state may have been absorbed under Dantidurga of Rashtrakuta dynasty.

== Religion ==
The rulers till Dadda III were worshipers of Surya (sun) but after Dadda III they are identified as Shaiva. Jayabhata I and Dadda II, are given the epithets 'Vitarāga' and 'Prasāntarāga’ in their grants—words which indicate that they may have patronized Jainism though they themselves were not converts.

== List of rulers ==
- Dadda I. c. 438 A.D.
- Jayabhaṭa I. Vītarāga, c. 455 CE
- Dadda II. Praśāntarāga, c. 478-495 CE
- Dadda III 580 CE
- Jayabhaṭa II. c. 650–675 CE
- Dadda IV. Bāhusahāya, c. 675–690 CE
- Jayabhaṭa III. c. 690–710 CE
- Ahirole c. 710–720 CE
- Jayabhaṭa IV c. 720–737 CE
