= Vijaya-Bhattarika =

Chalukya queen and regent from 650 to 655

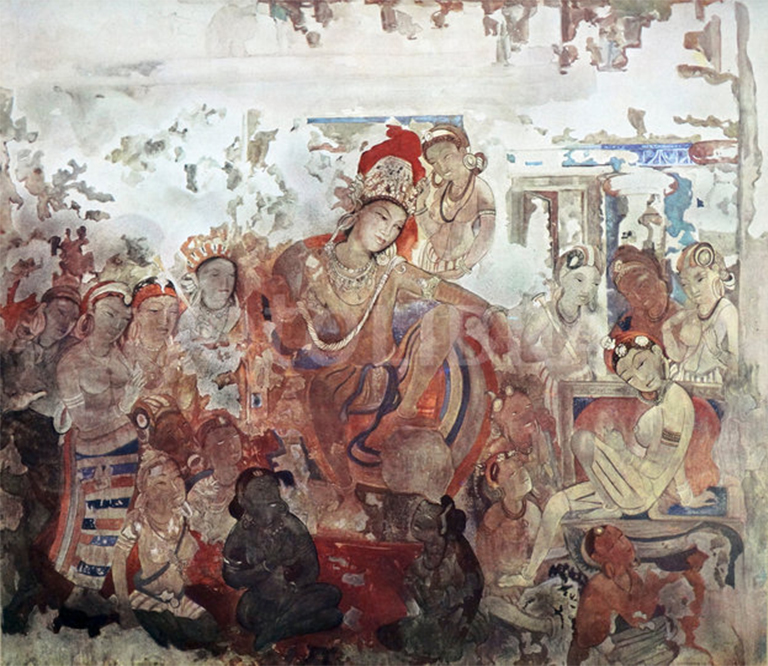
- Mural of Chandraditya and a consort, possibly Vijaya, at the Badami Caves.

Chalukya regent
- Reign: c. 650 – c. 655
- Predecessor: Chandraditya
- Successor: Vikramaditya I
- Died: Badami, Chalukya Dynasty.
- Spouse: Chandraditya
- Dynasty: Chalukyas of Vatapi

Vijaya-Bhattarika (r. c. 650-655 CE) was a member of the Chalukya royal family of Deccan region in southern India. She is known from her Nerur and Kochre grant inscriptions, which call her Vijaya-Bhattarika and Vijaya-Mahadevi respectively.

Vijaya-Bhatarika was the wife of Chandraditya, who appears to have held the weakened Chalukya throne for a brief period, in the years following the Pallava invasion of the Chalukya capital Vatapi. After Chandraditya's death, Vijaya-Bhattarika seems to have acted as a regent for their minor son. Subsequently, the throne passed to her brother-in-law Vikramaditya I, who had probably become the de facto ruler during her regency, after having restored the dynasty's power as the supreme commander of the Chalukya army.

== Sources of information ==
Vijaya-Bhattarika is known from her Nerur and Kochre (or Kochri) inscriptions, which register her land grants to brahmanas. The Nerur inscription calls her "Vijaya-Bhaṭṭārika", while the Kochre inscription calls her "Vijaya-Mahādevī".

== Political status ==
Vijaya-Bhattarika's husband Chandraditya was one of the sons of the powerful Chalukya king Pulakeshin II, who was defeated and probably killed during the Pallava invasion of the Chalukya capital Vatapi around c. 642 CE. The Chalukya power was restored by Chandraditya's younger brother Vikramaditya I around c. 655 CE, and the Chalukya history during the intervening period is uncertain: it is possible that after Pulakeshin's death, his son Adityavarman held the throne, followed by Adityavarman's son Abhinavaditya, and then by Chandraditya.

The theory that Vijaya-Bhattarika ruled as a regent for her minor son after Chandraditya's death is based on the following facts:

- Her Nerur and Kochre inscriptions accord her husband imperial titles, and her the titles of a chief queen: Mahishi, Bhattarika, and Mahadevi.
- The inscriptions are dated in her own regnal years, which suggests that Chandraditya was dead when these grants were issued.
- The inscriptions describe Vikramaditya as the person who restored Chalukya power by defeating hostile kings, but do not accord him any royal title.

It is possible that Vikramaditya rose to prominence after having restored the dynasty's power as the supreme commander of the Chalukya army, and became the de facto ruler during the regency of Vijaya-Bhattarika. Later, he formally ascended the Chalukya throne, possibly after the son of Vijaya-Bhattarika and Chandraditya died (naturally or otherwise).

The Nerur inscription suggests that she ruled as a regent for at least 5 years.

== Identification with Vijayanka and Vijja ==
Rajashekhara, a noted Sanskrit poet and dramatist of the 9th-10th century, mentions a woman poet called Vijayanka, who belonged to the historical Karnata region (in present-day Karnataka). This region was a part of the Chalukya territory, and based on similarity of names, some modern scholars - such as M. B. Padma of University of Mysore - have identified this poet with the Chalukya royal Vijaya-Bhattarika. A verse, attributed to Rajashekhara in Jalhana's Suktimuktavali, compares Vijayanka to Sarasvati, the goddess of wisdom and learning.

Vijayanka, in turn, has been identified by some scholars with Vijja, a Sanskrit woman poet known from major anthologies of Sanskrit verses. One of the verses from these anthologies compares Vijja to the goddess of learning, Sarasvati, and states that she had a dark complexion unlike the goddess. This verse also mentions the famous poet Daṇḍin (a native of southern India), calling him wrong for describing Sarasvati as "all-white". The verse may be considered as evidence supporting Vijja's connections to south India, where the Chalukyas ruled, but there is no concrete proof that she was same as the Chalukya royal Vijaya-Bhattarika. In fact, such an identification results in chronological improbabilities: the poet whose works mention the 8th century poet Dandin could not have been the 7th century royal Vijaya-Bhattarika, unless she lived until the end of the century, and deigned to notice a verse by a much younger author. The names "Vijaya" (literally "victory") and "Vijayanka" (literally "having the mark of victory") have a different meaning from the name Vijja (literally "knowledge" or "science").
