= Adityavarman =

Adityavarman is a masculine given name. Notable people with the name include:

- Adityavarman (Chalukya dynasty) (fl. 7th-century), ruler of Vatapi in India
- Adityawarman (1294–1375), ruler of Malayapura in Sumatra
