= Chandraditya (Chalukya dynasty) =

Chalukya emperor from 646 to 649

- Shri-prithvi-vallabha, Maharajadhiraja, Parameshvara

Chalukya emperor
- Reign: c. 646 – c. 649
- Predecessor: possibly Abhinavaditya
- Successor: minor son, with his wife Vijaya-Bhattarika as regent
- Spouse: Vijaya-Bhattarika
- Dynasty: Chalukyas of Vatapi
- Father: Pulakeshin II

Chandraditya (IAST: Chandrādityā, r. c. 646-649) was a king of the Chalukya dynasty of Vatapi that ruled in the Deccan region of peninsular India. His father Pulakeshin II was a powerful emperor, who was defeated and most probably killed during a Pallava invasion.

Chandraditya was probably among the kings who held the weakened throne for a brief period after Pulakeshin's death, having been preceded by his brother Adityavarman, and Adityavarman's son Abhinavaditya. After his death, his wife Vijaya-Bhattarika appears to have ruled as a regent on behalf of their minor son. During this period, his brother Vikramaditya I, who later ascended the throne, seems to have restored the Chalukya power as the supreme commander of the Chalukya army.

== Sources of information ==
Chandraditya is known from the Nerur and Kochre (or Kochri) grant inscriptions of his wife Vijaya-Bhattarika (alias Vijaya-Mahadevi). He also finds a mention in the Kuknur inscription of his younger brother Vikramaditya I.

== Political status ==
Chandraditya was one of the sons of the powerful Chalukya king Pulakeshin II, who was defeated and probably killed during the Pallava invasion of the Chalukya capital Vatapi around c. 642. The Chalukya power was restored by Pulakeshin's son Vikramaditya I around c. 655, and the Chalukya history during the intervening period is uncertain: it is possible that after Pulakeshin's death, his son Adityavarman held the throne, followed by Adityavarman's son Abhinavaditya.

The Kuknur inscription of Vikramaditya accords Chandraditya the title Bhattaraka. The royal genealogy section of the Nerur inscription introduces Chandraditya's younger brother Vikramaditya I after his father Pulakeshin II, describing Vikramaditya as the restorer of the Chalukya rule. Therefore, scholars such as J. F. Fleet and D. C. Sircar theorize that Chandraditya was a feudatory ruler.

Other scholars, such as D. P. Dikshit, theorize that Chandraditya held the throne after Abhinavaditya, during c. 646-649 CE, based on the following points:

- The Nerur and Kochre inscriptions of Chandraditya's wife Vijaya-Bhattarika accord him the imperial titles Shri-prithvi-vallabha ("beloved of the goddess of wealth and the earth"), Parameshvara ("supreme lord"), and Maharajadhiraja ("king of great kings").
- The inscriptions accord Vijaya-Bhattarika the titles of a chief queen: Mahishi, Bhattarika, and Mahadevi.
- The inscriptions describe Vikramaditya as the younger brother of Chandraditya and the "dear son" of Pulakeshin, and as the person who restored Chalukya power by defeating hostile kings. However, they do not accord any royal title to Vikramaditya.

The inscriptions are dated in the regnal years of Vijaya-Bhattarika, which suggests that Chandraditya was dead when these grants were issued. According to one theory, his wife was ruling as a regent on behalf of their minor son at this time. It is possible that Vikramaditya rose to prominence during this period, and became the de facto ruler, after having restored the dynasty's power as the supreme commander of the Chalukya army. Later, he formally ascended the Chalukya throne, possibly after the son of Chandraditya and Vijaya died (naturally or otherwise).
