= Pulakeshin II =

Chalukya Emperor from 609 to 642

- Satyashraya; Shri-prithvi-vallabha; Bhattaraka; Maharajadhiraja; Parameshvara
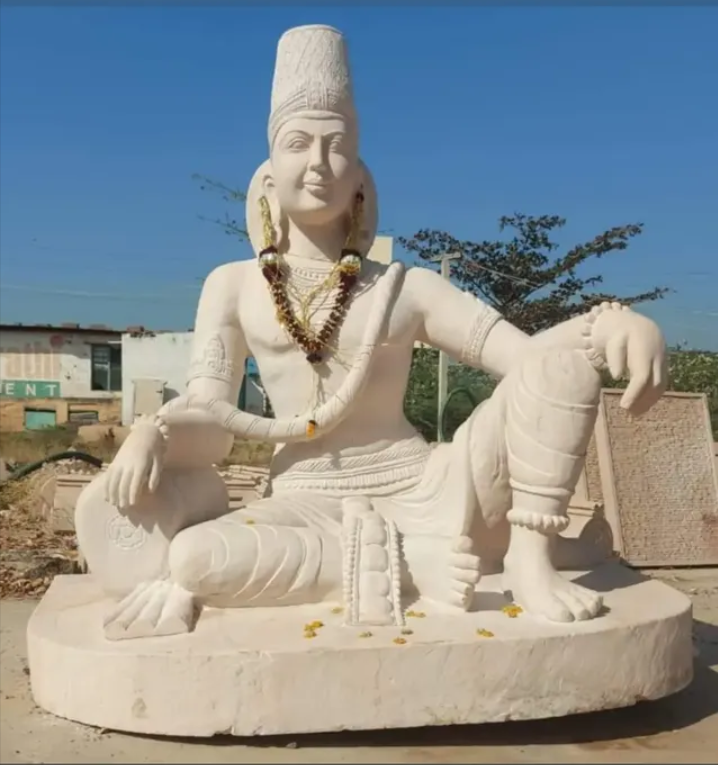
- Statue of Pulakeshin II in Badami

Chalukya emperor
- Reign: c. 609 – c. 642
- Predecessor: Mangalesha
- Successor: Adityavarman
- Died: c. 642
- Issue: Adityavarman; Chandraditya; Ranaragha-varman; Vikramaditya I Dharashraya Jayasimhavarman
- Dynasty: Chalukyas of Vatapi
- Father: Kirttivarman I

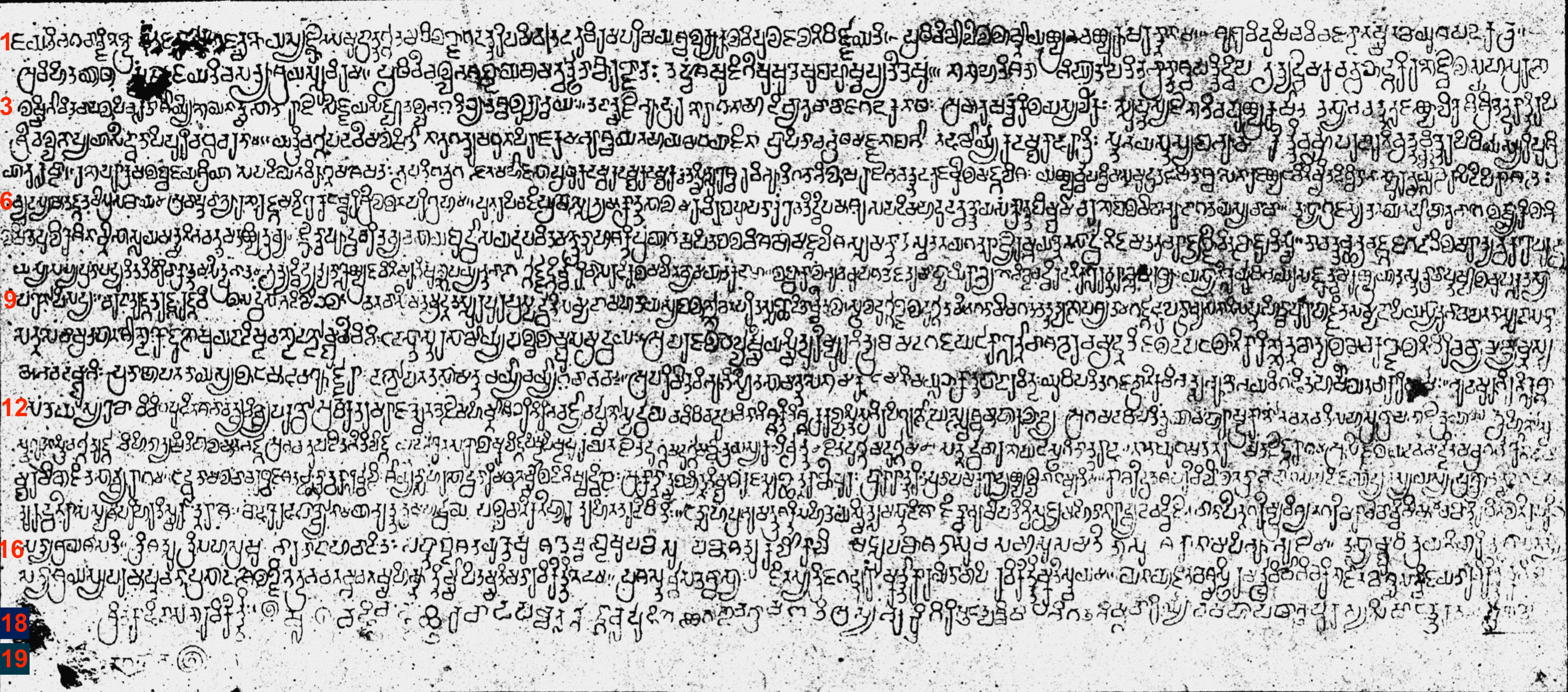
Ravikirti's inscription, Meguti Jain Basadi, Aihole which celebrates Pulakeshin II's military achievements.

Pulakeshin II (IAST: Pulakeśin; r. 609–642), popularly known as Immaḍi Pulakeśi, was the Chālukyan emperor from c. 609 to 642. During his reign, the Chalukya empire of Vatapi expanded to cover most of the Deccan region in peninsular India.

A son of the Chalukya monarch Kirttivarman I, Pulakeshin overthrew his uncle Mangalesha to gain control of the throne. He suppressed a rebellion by Appayika and Govinda, and decisively defeated the Kadambas of Banavasi in the south. The Alupas and the Gangas of Talakadu recognized his suzerainty. He consolidated the Chalukya control over the western coast by subjugating the Mauryas of Konkana. His Aihole inscription also credits him with subjugating the Latas, the Malavas, and the Gurjaras in the north.

The most notable military achievement of Pulakeshin was his victory over the powerful northern emperor Harshavardhana, whose failure to conquer the Chalukyan territories to the south is attested by the Chinese pilgrim Xuanzang. In the east, Pulakeshin subjugated the rulers of Dakshina Kosala and Kalinga. After defeating the Vishnukundina monarch, he appointed his brother Vishnu-vardhana as the governor of eastern Deccan; this brother later established the independent Eastern Chalukya dynasty of Vengi. Pulakeshin also achieved some successes against the Pallavas in the south, but was ultimately defeated and possibly killed during an invasion by the Pallava monarch Narasimhavarman I in c. 642–643 CE.

Pulakeshi was a Vaishnavite, but was tolerant of other faiths, including Shaivite Hinduism, Buddhism, and Jainism. He patronized several Jaina scholars, including Ravikirtti, who composed his Aihole inscription.

== Names and titles ==
Two variants of Pulakeshin's name appear in the Chalukya records: Pulikeshin (IAST: Pulikeśin) and Polekeshin (IAST: Polekeśin). "Ereya" appears to have been another of his names: the Peddavaduguru inscription calls him "Ereyatiyadigal" (or "Ereyitiyadigal"), the Bijapur-Mumbai inscription mentions the variant "Eraja", and the Shanka Basadi inscription Basti-Bana Pulakeśi calls him "Ereyamma". Historian K. V. Ramesh theorizes that Ereya was the pre-coronation name of Pulakeshin.

Satyashraya ("refuge of truth"), a hereditary biruda (epithet) of Pulakeshin, was commonly used as a substitute for his name in the dynasty's records. He was the dynasty's most celebrated ruler, because of which the subsequent rulers called their dynasty Satyashraya-kula ("family of Satyashraya").

The imperial titles of Pulakeshin include Bhattaraka and Maharajadhiraja ("King of great kings"). Besides, he also used the family epithets Shri-prithvi-vallabha, Vallabha, and Shri-vallabha. Pulakeshin also assumed the title Parameshvara ("Supreme Lord") after defeating Harsha, as attested by his Bijapur-Mumbai inscription.

The Chinese traveler Xuanzang calls him Pu-lo-ki-she. The Persian historian Al-Tabari calls him Paramesa or Pharmis, probably a Persian transcription of his title Parameshvara.

== Early years ==
Pulakeshin was a son of the Chalukya monarch Kirttivarman I. When Kirttivarman died, Pulakeshin appears to have been a minor, as Kirttivarman's younger brother Mangalesha succeeded him.

The inscriptions of the later Chalukyas of Kalyani, who claimed descent from the Chalukyas of Vatapi, state that Mangalesha "took upon himself the burden of administration" because Pulakeshin was a minor. However, these inscriptions also wrongly claim that Mangalesha returned the kingdom to Pulakeshin when Pulakeshin grew up, praising the Chalukya lineage for such exemplary behaviour. This claim is contradicted by Pulakeshin's own Aihole inscription, and appears to be a late attempt to gloss over Pulakeshin's overthrow of Mangalesha. The exact details of the conflict between these two men are unclear, because the Aihole inscription describes it in a rather enigmatic way.

It is possible that Mangalesha initially ruled as a regent, but later decided to usurp the throne. According to the Aihole inscription, Mangalesha was envious of Pulakeshin, because Pulakeshin was a favourite of Lakshmi (the goddess of fortune). Therefore, Pulakeshin, decided to go into exile. Subsequently, Mangalesha became weak "on all sides" as Pulakeshin applied his "gifts of good counsel and energy". Ultimately, Mangalesha had to abandon three things simultaneously: his attempt to secure the throne for his own son (or his ability to perpetuate his own descent), his kingdom, and his own life. The above description suggests that when Pulakeshin became an adult, Mangalesha rejected his claim to the throne and possibly appointed his own son as the heir apparent. Pulakeshin went into exile, during which he must have planned an attack on Mangalesha; he ultimately defeated and killed Mangalesha.

The undated Peddavaduguru inscription records Pulakeshin's grant of the Elpattu Simbhige village after his subjugation of Ranavikrama. According to one theory, this Ranavikrama was Mangalesha, who bore the title "Ranavikrama", and who was defeated by Mangalesha in a battle fought at Elpattu Simbhige. However, another theory identifies Ranavikrama as a Bana king.

=== Date of ascension ===
Pulakeshin's Hyderabad inscription is dated 613 CE (Shaka year 534), and was issued during the third year of his reign, which suggests that he must have ascended the throne in c. 610–611 CE.

The exact year of his ascension is debated among modern scholars. The 610–611 CE Goa grant inscription, which refers to an unnamed Chalukya overlord titled Shri-prithvi-vallabha Maharaja, was probably issued during the reign of Pulakeshin's predecessor Mangalesha. It is dated to the Shaka year 532: assuming it was issued after 532 years of the Shaka era had expired, the date of issue was 4 January 611 CE. However, if we assume that it was issued when the 532rd year of the Shaka era was current, it can be dated to 5 July 610 CE. Based on this inscription, the end of Mangalesha's reign is variously dated to 610 CE or 611 CE.

The matter is further complicated by the Maruturu inscription, which is dated to Pulakeshin's eighth regnal year, and was issued on the occasion of a solar eclipse on the new moon day (amavasya) of the Jyeshtha month. According to modern calculations, this solar eclipse took place on 21 May 616 CE, which would mean that Pulakeshin ascended the throne in 609 CE.

== Military conquests ==
After Mangalesha's death, Pulakeshin appears to have faced opposition from multiple rivals, including those who were loyal to Mangalesha and those who wanted to take advantage of the turmoil resulting from the Chalukya war of succession. The Aihole inscription declares that "the whole world was enveloped in the darkness that was the enemies". Pulakeshin subjugated these enemies, and established the Chalukyas as the dominant power in the Indian peninsula.

=== Appayika and Govinda ===
The Aihole inscription suggests that two rulers named Appayika and Govinda rebelled against Pulakeshin. The identity of these rulers is uncertain, but they are said to have approached the core Chalukya territory from the north of the Bhimarathi (modern Bhima) river in present-day Maharashtra. According to historian K. A. Nilakanta Sastri, the way they are mentioned in the inscription suggests that they were military adventurers and not from a royal background. However, according to historian Durga Prasad Dikshit, their names suggest that they may have belonged to a Rashtrakuta branch, which was distinct from the imperial Rashtrakutas of Manyakheta. This branch may have become subordinate to the Chalukyas after facing invasions from the Nala and Mauryas of Konkan, and later rebelled taking advantage of the conflict between Pulakeshin and Mangalesha.

According to the Aihole inscription, Pulakeshin adopted the policy of bheda (divide and conquer), and bestowed favours upon Govinda while alienating Appayika. Govinda became his ally, and Appayika was defeated.

=== Recapture of Banavasi ===
Pulakeshin's predecessors had subjugated the Kadambas of Banavasi, but the Kadambas no longer recognized the Chalukya suzerainty during his reign. Pulakeshin marched against them, and besieged their capital of Banavasi. The Aihole inscription suggests that the Kadambas put up a strong resistance, but were ultimately defeated. The Kadamba ruler at this time was probably Bhogivarman.

Pulakeshin ended the Kadamba dynasty, and annexed their territory to his empire. He divided this territory among his vassals: the major part of the Kadamba kingdom was granted to the Alupas under the name kadamba-mandala; the Nagarakhanda division of Banavasi was given to the Sendrakas.

=== Alupas ===
According to the Aihole inscription, Pulakeshin subjugated the Alupas, who had earlier served as Kadamba vassals. However, according to the Chalukya inscriptions, the Alupas had already been subjugated by Pulakeshin's predecessors. Therefore, it appears that the Aihole inscription simply refers to Pulakeshin reaffirming the Chalukya suzerainty over the Alupas. Another possibility is that the Alupas had not been completely subdued by the Pulakeshin's predecessors.

The location of the core Alupa territory during Pulakeshin's period is not certain. Alupas are known to have been ruling in the Dakshina Kannada region of Karnataka for several centuries, but some scholars believe that their capital was located at Humcha in the Shimoga district. After subjugating the Kadambas, Pulakeshin assigned a major part of the former Kadamba territory to his Alupa vassal, who according to historian Moraes, may have been Kundavarammarasa.

If "Aluka" is considered a variant of "Alupa", the Marutura inscription suggests that the Alupa vassals of Pulakeshin also ruled over the Guntur district in present-day Andhra Pradesh. According to this inscription, the Aluka ruler Gunasagara, who was a Chalukya vassal, was appointed to govern this region. The 692 CE Sorab inscription describes Gunasagara's son Chitra-vahana as an "Alupa", which suggests that "Aluka" is a variant of "Alupa".

=== Gangas of Talakad ===
The Aihole inscription credits Pulakeshin with subjugating the Gangas of Talakad, who had matrimonial ties with the Kadambas. The Mahakuta pillar inscription of his predecessor Mangalesha states his father Kirttivarman also subjugated the Gangas. It is possible that the Gangas accepted the Chalukya suzerainty during Kirttivarman's reign, but subsequently gave up this allegiance taking advantage of the war of succession between Mangalesha and Pulakeshin. After Pulakeshin's victory over the Kadambas, the Gangas again accepted the Chalukya suzerainty, possibly without any military conflict.

The Ganga ruler Durvinita married his daughter to Pulakeshin; she was the mother of Pulakeshin's son Vikramaditya I. The Gangas probably hoped to gain Chalukya support against the Pallavas, who had captured the Kongunadu region from them. The Gangas subsequently defeated the Pallava ruler Kaduvetti of Kanchi. In return, Shilabhattarika, a daughter of Pulakeshin II was married to Dadiga, a son of Mokkara (Mushkara) and grandson of Durvinita, as attested by a copperplate charter of Chalukya Vijayaditya dated January–February 717 CE. Shreenand L. Bapat of Bhandarkar Oriental Research Institute, who deciphered this inscription, identifies her with the renowned Sanskrit poet Shilabhattarika.

=== Mauryas of Konkana ===
Pulakeshin's father Kirttivarman had defeated the Mauryas of Konkana (modern Konkan), who ruled in the coastal region of present-day Goa and Maharashtra. The Mauryas acknowledged the Chalukya suzerainty during Mangalesha's reign, but seem to have declared independence during the Chalukya war of succession. After consolidating his power in southern Deccan, Pulakeshin successfully besieged the Mauryan capital Puri, which is variously identified as Gharapuri (Elephanta) or Rajapuri (near Janjira).

=== Latas, Malavas, and Gurjaras ===
The Aihole inscription states that Pulakeshin subjugated the Latas, the Malavas, and the Gurjaras, who were the northern neighbours of the Chalukyas. Historian Durga Prasad Dikshit theorizes that these kingdoms may have accepted Pulakeshin's suzerainty without a military conflict, when faced with an invasion from the northern king Harshavardhana. Alternatively, it is possible that these three rulers accepted Mangalesha's suzerainty after his victory over the Kalachuris, and the Aihole inscription simply refers to Pulakeshin reaffirming the Chalukya suzerainty over them.

The Lata region (present-day southern Gujarat) was formerly under the control of the Kalachuris, who had been defeated by Mangalesha. Pulakeshin, who appears to have annexed Lata to the Chalukya kingdom, placed it under the governorship of a member of the Chalukya family. The rule of the Chalukya governor Vijaya-varma-raja over Lata is attested by his 643 CE Kheda copper-plate inscription.

The Malavas ruled in and around the present-day Malwa (Malava) region in central India. According to the Chinese traveler Xuanzang, Malava ("Mo-la-po") was an independent kingdom, but the records of the Maitraka dynasty suggest that the Maitrakas controlled at least a part of the Malava territory. Thus, the Malavas may have been Maitraka vassals or independent rulers before they accepted Pulakeshin's suzerainty.

The Gurjaras were most probably the Gurjaras of Lata (or Bharuch), and the Gurjara ruler who accepted Pulakeshin's suzerainty was probably Dadda II.

=== Victory over Harsha ===
The most notable military achievement of Pulakeshin was his victory over the powerful emperor Harsha-vardhana, who ruled over much of northern India. The inscriptions of Pulakeshin's successors prominently mention this victory even when they ignore his other military achievements.

==== Date ====
The date of the war between Harsha and Pulakeshin has been debated by modern scholars. The Kandalgaon copper-plate inscription, dated to Pulakeshin's fifth regnal year (c. 615 CE), mentions the conflict, but this inscription is regarded as spurious by modern scholars.

Some scholars, such as K. V. Ramesh and K. A. Nilakanta Sastri, date the battle to c. 612 CE or before, based on the 612–613 CE Hyderabad inscription of Pulakeshin. This inscription boasts that Pulakeshin defeated a king who had fought a hundred battles (presumably Harsha). The later Chalukya inscriptions, dating from the reign of Vikramaditya I onwards, mention Pulakeshin's victory over Harsha using similar expressions. This early date for the war is also supported by the writings of Xuanzang, who states that Harsha fought wars for six years, and then ruled in peace for thirty years.

Scholars Shreenand L. Bapat and Pradeep S. Sohoni date the battle to the winter of 618–619 CE. These scholars note that the Bijapur-Mumbai grant inscription, dated 4 April 619 CE, mentions Pulakeshin's victory over Harsha, which proves that the conflict definitely took place sometime before this date. The earlier Satara inscription of Pulakeshin's brother Vishnu-vardhana, issued during his eighth regnal year (c. 618 CE) does not mention the conflict. Based on this, Bapat and Sohoni theorize that the conflict took place between November 618 CE and February 619 CE.

Some earlier scholars, such as D. Devahuti dated the conflict to 630s CE, but this is no longer considered correct after the publication of the Bijapur-Mumbai inscription in 2017.

==== Cause of the war ====
The cause of the war between Harsha and Pulakeshin is not certain. Historian K. A. Nilakanta Sastri suggests that Harsha's growing influence may have driven the Latas, the Malavas, and the Gurjaras to accept Pulakeshin's suzerainty. Historian Durga Prasad Dikshit adds that these three kingdoms are known to have been enemies of Harsha's father Prabhakara-vardhana, as attested by Harsha's court poet Bana: this enmity probably continued during the reign of Harsha. The Malava king played a role in the murder of Harsha's predecessor Rajya-vardhana, and also killed Harsha's brother-in-law, the Maukhari ruler Graha-varman. The Gurjara ruler Dadda II aided the Maitraka dynasty against Harsha. When Harsha decided to take action against these three kingdoms, their rulers probably sought the protection of Pulakeshin. Pulakeshin may have granted asylum to Harsha's adversaries.

According to scholars Shreenand L. Bapat and Pradeep S. Sohoni, the "Malavas" mentioned in the Chalukya record were the Later Guptas who controlled the Malwa region. The expansion of the Maitraka influence in the Malwa region must have attracted Harsha's attention. The Maitraka ruler Shiladitya I may have sympathized with Pulakeshin's cause during the latter's northern campaign against the Latas, the Malavas, and the Gurjaras. This situation ultimately resulted in a conflict between Harsha and Pulakeshin.

Another possibility is that Harsha decided to take advantage of the turmoil resulting from the conflict between Mangalesha and Pulakeshin, and invaded the Chalukya kingdom. During his march against Pulakeshin, Harsha advanced up to the Narmada River before being forced to retreat.

==== Result ====
The Aihole inscription of Pulakeshin boasts the harsha (mirth) of Harsha melted away by fear, as his elephants fell in the battle. The only other inscription from his reign that mentions this battle is the Bijapur-Mumbai inscription. Harsha's court poet Bana does not mention this conflict in his biography Harsha-charita, presumably to avoid portraying his patron in a negative light. However, Pulakeshin's success against Harsha is confirmed by other independent sources.

The Chinese traveler Xuanzang, who calls Pulakeshin's kingdom Mo-ho-la-cha (the Chinese transcription of "Maharashtra"), provides evidence of Pulakeshin's success against Harsha. Xuanzang states that Shiladitya (that is, Harsha) had conquered the nations from east to west, and had marched with his army to remote parts of India: only the people of Mo-ho-la-cha had refused to accept his suzerainty. Xuanzang further states that Harsha gathered troops from different parts of his kingdom, summoned his best commanders, and led the army to punish the people of Mo-ho-la-cha, but could not subjugate them.

The Rashtrakutas, who ultimately overthrew the Chalukyas several years after Pulakeshin's death, also boast that they defeated the dynasty that claimed victory over Harshavardhana, thus indirectly confirming Pulakeshin's achievement.

The Aihole inscription poetically states that Pulakeshin's elephants had to avoid the neighbourhood of the Vindhya mountains beside the Narmada River, because they "by their bulk, rivalled the mountains". Historian K. A. Nilakanta Sastri interprets to mean that Pulakeshin "did not send his elephant forces into the difficult Vindhya terrain", and guarded the passes with infantry. According to Shreenand L. Bapat and Pradeep S. Sohoni, the inscription suggests that Pulakeshin's army subsequently tried to cross the Vindhyas, in a bid to invade Harsha's kingdom, but was unsuccessful, which may explain why only two inscriptions from Pulakeshin's reign mention his conflict with Harsha.

=== Dakshina Kosala and Kalinga ===
The Aihole inscription states that the rulers of Koshala and Kalinga accepted Pulakeshin's suzerainty without offering any resistance.

Koshala here can be identified as Dakshina Kosala (present-day Chhattisgarh and western Odisha), which was probably under the Panduvamshi rule. The Aihole inscription does not mention the name of the subjugated ruler, but historian D. C. Sircar theorizes that he may have been the Panduvamshi king Mahashivagupta Balarjuna.

The name of the ruler of Kalinga, which includes parts of present-day Odisha and northern Andhra Pradesh, is not certain either. Historian Durga Prasad Dikshit suggests that he was probably a member of the Eastern Ganga dynasty. Historian K. A. Nilakanta Sastri suggests that he may have been a Vishnukundina feudatory.

=== Vishnukundina dynasty ===
According to the Aihole inscription and the Maruturu inscription, Pulakeshin invaded and captured Pishtapura (modern Pithapuram in Andhra Pradesh). The Maruturu inscription suggests that this event took place around or before 617–618 CE. The Aihole inscription states that subsequently, a fierce battle was fought near Kunala lake (identified with modern Kolleru Lake), whose water turned red with the blood of those killed in the war. These inscriptions do not name Pulakeshin's rival in these conflicts, but modern scholars identify him as a king of the Vishnukundina dynasty, which ruled in Andhra Pradesh.

Pulakeshin probably subjugated Vishnukundina vassals during his eastern campaign in Kalinga, which may have brought him in conflict with the Vishnukundina dynasty. Pulakeshin conquered the Vishnukundina kingdom, located in the lower Godavari-Krishna valley, and appointed his younger brother 'Kubja' Vishnu-vardhana as the governor of the newly conquered territory. The Chalukya conquest in this region is corroborated by Vishnu-vardhana's 631 CE Kopparam copper-plate inscription, which records a land grant in the Karma-rashtra region of present-day Andhra Pradesh.

The Vishnukundina ruler defeated by Pulakeshin was probably Indravarman: he appears to have ultimately accepted Pulakeshin's suzerainty, and was allowed to rule as a Chalukya vassal. Pulakeshin assigned some of the newly conquered territories to his own feudatories. For example, the Maruturu inscription states that the Aluka ruler Gunasagara, a Chalukya vassal, came from Mangalapura (identified with modern Mangalagiri in Guntur district) to Kallura after undergoing several hardships.

== Xuanzang's visit ==
The Chinese pilgrim Xuanzang visited Pulakeshin's empire in 641–642 CE. He calls the Chalukya emperor the ruler of "Mo-ho-la-cha" (the Chinese transcription of "Maharashtra"), and corroborates Pulakeshin II's success against emperor Harsha (see above). He had visited the Pallava state before arriving in the Chalukya empire, but he does not mention any conflict between the two states, presumably because he was not aware of major political changes or because his main interest was Buddhism rather than politics.

Xuanzang describes Pulakeshin ("Po-le-ke-she") as "a man of farsighted resource and astuteness who extends kindness to all". The emperor's subjects were "tall and sturdy in nature and... proud and carefree by nature... grateful for kindness and revengeful for injustice". They preferred death to disloyalty, and called for a duel if they or their families were insulted.

According to Xuanzang, the emperor was war-like and loved "military arts", because he was a Kshatriya by birth. His well-disciplined troops comprised several thousands of men, and several hundreds of war elephants. The elephants, who were intoxicated with wine before battles, were used to break the enemy's front line. When his generals were defeated, they were not punished, but were humiliated by being ordered to wear women's dresses. The soldiers who lost a battle would commit suicide as a matter of honour.

According to Xuanzang, the empire's capital (not named by Xuanzang) was situated to the east of a large river, around 1000 li from Bharukachchha (modern Bharuch). This description does not fit the Chalukya capital Vatapi (modern Badami). Modern scholars identify the city mentioned by Xuanzang as Nashik, although this identification is not conclusive. It is possible that Xuanzang spent some time in Nashik, which was an important centre of Buddhism, and mistook it as the empire's capital. Xuanzang mentions that there were five stupas in and around the capital city: these stupas had been built by the earlier Mauryan emperor Ashoka, and were several hundred feet high. Around 5,000 Buddhist monks lived in over 100 monasteries in the empire; in particular, Xuanzang describes a large monastery identified with the Ajanta Caves by modern scholars. Xuanzang adds that the emperor also had temples of "heretics" who "smeared dust on their bodies".

== War with the Pallavas and defeat ==
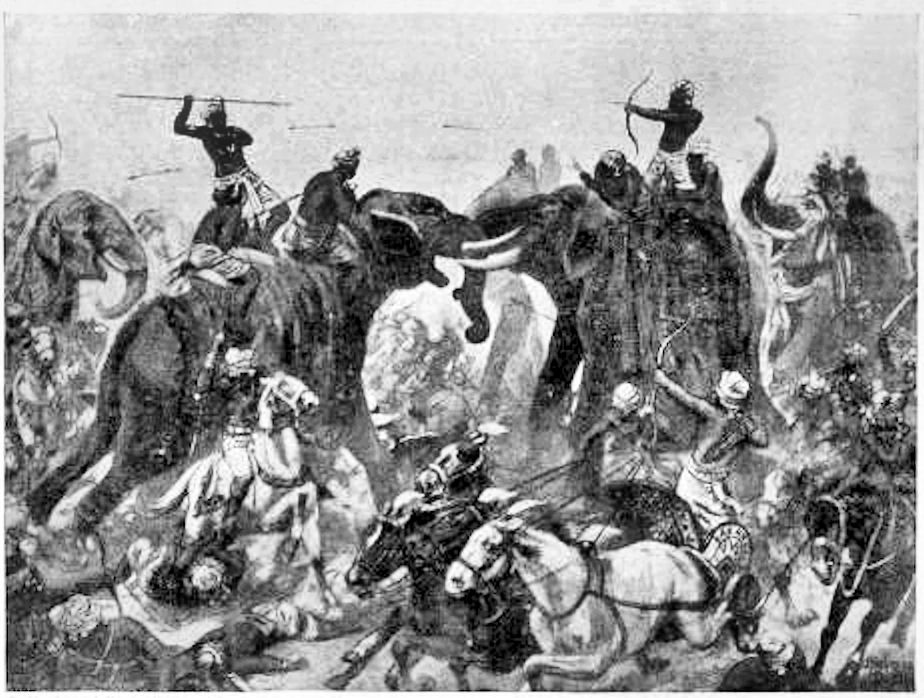
"The defeat of Pulakeshin II, the Chalukya, by Mahamalla Pallava at Badami", an artistic depiction of Pulakeshin's defeat

During the reign of Pulakeshin II, the Badami Chalukyas reconquered the former Ananda territory near present-day Guntur from the Pallavas. According to D. P. Dikshit, the Anandas had not come into direct conflict with the Chalukyas, and their territory had earlier been seized by the Pallavas during the third quarter of the sixth century. The Chalukyas subsequently conquered the region from the Pallavas and incorporated it into their expanding dominions. .The Pallavas were the southern neighbours of the Chalukyas. The Vishnukundins were their allies at the time, and Pulakeshin's subjugation of the Vishnukundins brought him in conflict with the Pallava monarch. The Chalukyas and the Pallavas fought several battles without conclusive results.

The Aihole inscription states that the Pallava ruler opposed the rise of Pulakeshin, who caused the enemy's splendour to be "obscured by the dust of his army" and forced the enemy to take shelter behind the walls of the Pallava capital Kanchipuram. The Kashakudi inscription of the Pallavas states that the Pallava Monarch Mahendravarman I defeated an unnamed enemy at Pallalura (modern Pullalur). These two accounts appear to refer to the same battle, which must have been inconclusive: the Pallava army was probably forced to retreat to Kanchipuram, but inflicted enough damage on the Chalukya army to force Pulakeshin to retreat to Vatapi. K. V. Ramesh describes Mahendravarman I's claim in the Kasakkudi plates that he defeated all his enemies at Pullalur as "a rather general and vague claim", noting that it does not specify the enemy, the date, or the circumstances of the battle, and therefore cannot by itself serve as conclusive evidence for reconstructing specific historical events. The Aihole inscription of Pulakeshin II records that after conquering Kalinga and Pishtapura, he "conquered Kānchi and the Cholas on the banks of the Kāverī", before returning to Vātāpi. The inscription is reproduced in Sources of Karnataka History, Vol. I by S. Srikanta Sastri.

According to Anirudh Kanisetti, following the Chalukya victory at Pullalur, the defeated Pallava forces withdrew behind the walls of Kanchi as Pulakeshin II advanced on the city. He describes the Chalukya army approaching in clouds of dust, with hundreds of banners and royal umbrellas, ranks of spearmen, and Pulakeshin II riding a large elephant beneath the imperial parasol, surrounded by his leading generals and elite troops. Kanisetti states that Mahendravarman I, recognizing that his kingdom was unprepared for a direct confrontation, sought terms, after which Pulakeshin II withdrew to Vātāpi, having secured Pallava submission and Chalukya supremacy over Vengi. According to N. Venkataramanayya, the Koppāram Plates of Pulakeśin II attest his presence in the Coastal Telugu country in A.D. 631 and record the subjugation of Karmarāṣṭra, which until then belonged to the Pallavas of Kāñchi. Venkataramanayya further notes that while the plates confirm the conquest of Karmarāṣṭra, they do not indicate that this was Pulakeśin II's first campaign in the region or that he had not attempted its conquest earlier.

The undated Peddavaduguru inscription records Pulakeshin's grant of the Elpattu Simbhige village in Bana-raja-vishaya ("Bana king's province") after the subjugation of Ranavikrama. Assuming that Ranavikrama was a Bana king, it appears that Pulakeshin defeated the Banas. (An alternative theory identifies Ranavikrama as Mangalesha; see Early life section above.) The Banas appear to have been Pallava feudatories before their submission to Pulakeshin, as suggested by the name of the inscription's engraver: Mahendra Pallavachari. Pulakeshin's subjugation of a Pallava feudatory must have renewed his conflict with the Pallavas.

The Aihole inscription suggests that Pulakeshin won over the Chola, the Chera, and the Pandya kings as his allies in his struggle against the Pallavas. He marched towards Kanchipuram, but the Pallava inscriptions suggest that he suffered reverses in battles fought at Pariyala, Suramara, and Manimangala, near Kanchipuram.

The Pallavas, during the reign of Narasimhavarman I, ultimately besieged the Chalukyan capital Vatapi. Pulakeshin was probably killed, when a Pallava force led by General Shiruttondar Paranjoti captured Vatapi in c. 642–643 CE. The Pallava occupation of Vatapi is attested by an inscription found at the Mallikarjunadeva temple in Badami, dated to the 13th regnal year of Narasimhavarman I.

== Succession ==
By 641 CE, during Pulakeshin's lifetime, his brother Vishnu-vardhana had carved out an independent kingdom in the eastern part of the Chalukya empire, resulting in the establishment of the Chalukya dynasty of Vengi. According to one theory, this arrangement may have happened with the approval of Pulakeshin, who did not want his brother to wage a war of succession like Mangalesha.

Pulakeshin had multiple sons, and the order of succession after him is not clear from the available historical evidence:

- Adityavarman (c.643–645?) is attested by his Kurnool inscription, which describes him as a powerful ruler and gives him imperial titles. Historian T. V. Mahalingam theorizes that Adityavarman was simply a former name of Vikramaditya I. However, historian D. P. Dikshit disputes this identification, and believes that Adityavarman succeeded Pulakeshin, and in turn, was succeeded by his son Abhinavaditya (c.645–646?).
- Chandraditya (c.646–649?) attested by the Nerur and Kochre grant inscriptions of his wife Vijaya-Bhattarika, which accord him imperial titles, but are dated in the regnal years of his wife. It is possible that Chandraditya held the throne after Abhinavaditya, and after his death, his wife acted as a regent for their minor son (c.649–655). His brother Vikramaditya I, appears to have restored Chalukya power as the supreme commander of the Chalukya army during this period, becoming the de facto ruler in the process.
- Ranaragha-varman is attested by the Honnur inscription dated to the 16th regnal year of his younger brother Vikramaditya. The inscription states that Ranaragha-varman's daughter was the wife of the Ganga prince Madhava, a subordinate of Vikramaditya.
- Vikramaditya I (655–680) restored the Chalukya power, and recaptured Vatapi from the Pallavas.
- Dharashraya Jayasimha-varman, a younger brother of Vikramaditya, is attested by the 671 CE Navsari grant inscription.

== Extent of the empire ==
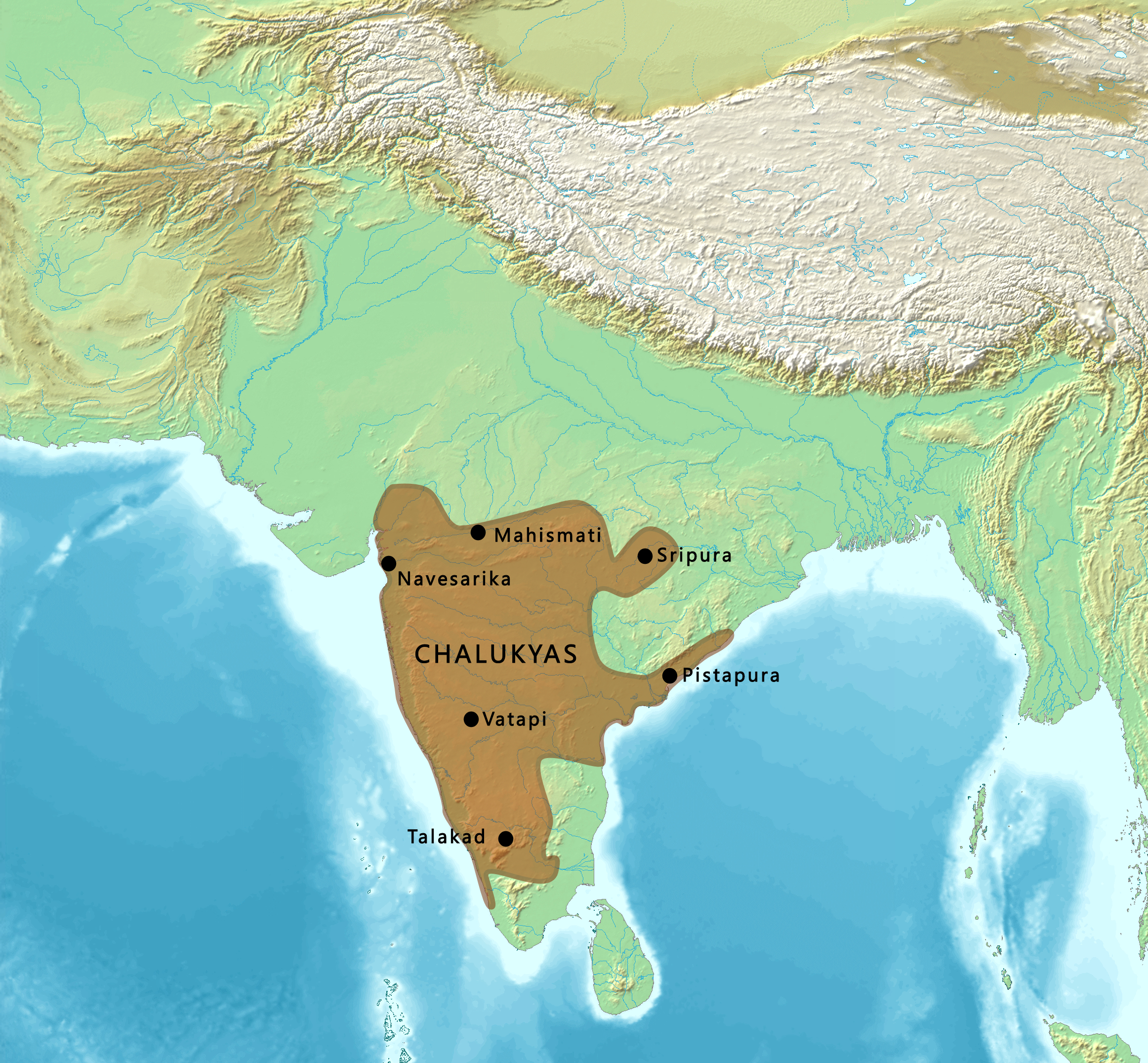
Chalukya territories during the reign of Pulakeshin II, as estimated by historian Suryanath U. Kamath.

The Chinese pilgrim Xuanzang attests that Pulakeshin ruled an extensive, militarily powerful and economically prosperous empire through several loyal vassals. The Aihole inscription states that Pulakeshin's empire was bound by the oceans on three sides, suggesting that he ruled a vast portion of the Indian peninsula to the south of the Vindhyas. However, there is no evidence that he was able to annex the extreme southern kingdoms of the Cholas, the Keralas (Cheras), and the Pandyas to his empire.

After his victory over Harsha, Pulakeshin appears to have acquired control of a large part of western Deccan to the south of the Narmada river. The Aihole inscription states that he gained control of the "three Maharashtrakas" which included 99,000 villages. The identity of these "three Maharashtras" is not certain: according to historian D. C. Sircar, they may have been the Maharashtra proper (a large part of present-day Maharashtra), Konkana, and Karnata.

Pulakeshin could not administer this large empire centrally, and therefore, ruled through governors from the Chalukya family and loyal vassals, who included the rulers defeated by him. The Sendraka prince Sena-nanda-raja ruled the Konkana and neighbouring areas as his loyal feudatory. The family of Alla-shakti ruled the Khandesh and neighbouring areas as his vassal, as attested by the Abhona and Kasare inscriptions.

After defeating the Vishnukundins, Pulakeshin acquired control of a large part of the eastern Deccan region, extending from Vishakhapatnam in the north to Nellore and Guntur in the south. Pulakeshin appointed his younger brother Vishnu-vardhana, who had earlier served as his governor of the Velvola country, as the governor of Vengi in eastern Deccan. Vishnu-vardhana acknowledges Pulakeshin's suzerainty in his 631 CE Kopparam inscription, but asserts himself as an independent ruler in his 641 CE Chirupalli inscription.

After Pulakeshin's death, the Chalukya governor Vijaya-varman, who ruled in the Lata region (in southern Gujarat), also seems to have asserted his independence. Vijaya-varman's 643 CE Kheda (Kaira) inscription records a land grant without any reference to a Chalukya overlord.

== Relations with Sassanid Persia ==
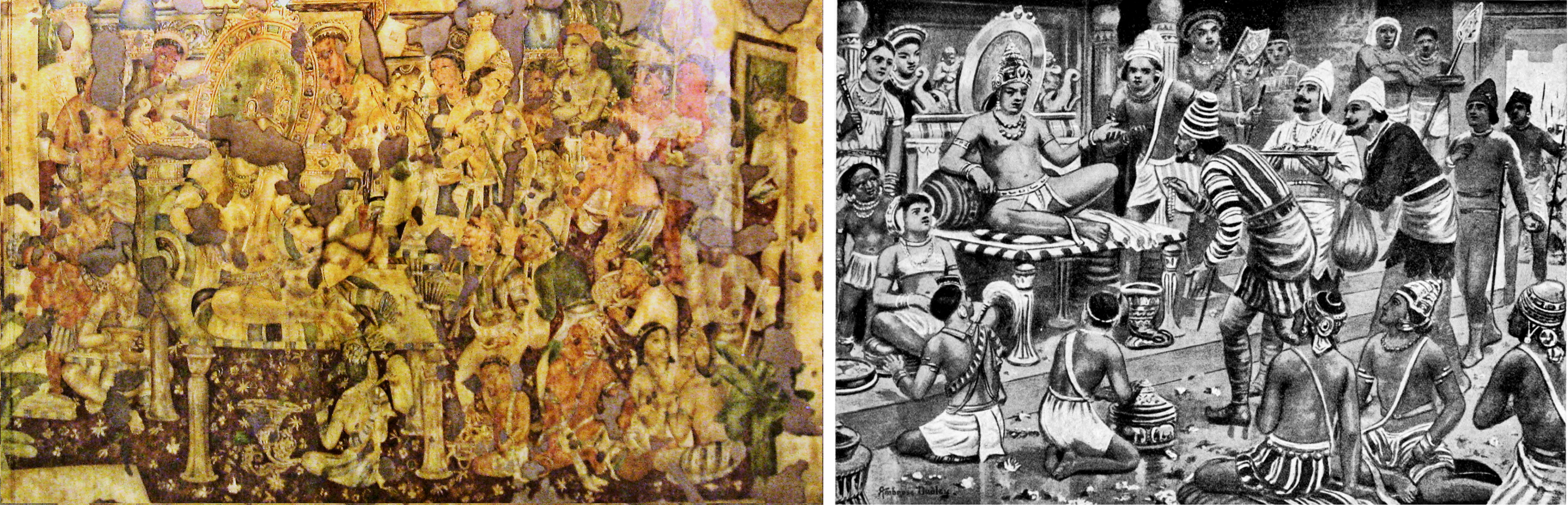
Original frescoes in Ajanta Cave 1, and corresponding artistic depiction of Pulakeshin receiving envoys from Persia. Earlier scholars believed that Pulakeshin received an envoy from the Sasanian emperor of Persia, based on the Ajanta cave painting, but this theory is no longer considered correct.

According to the ninth-century Persian historian Al-Tabari, Pulakeshin ("Pharmis") maintained diplomatic relations with the Sasanian Emperor Khosrow II of present-day Iran. Pulakeshin sent expensive presents and letters to Khusrow II and his sons, during the 26th regnal year of the Sasanian emperor. This embassy can be dated to c. 625 CE.

In the 1870s, architectural historian James Fergusson theorized that a painting at the Ajanta Cave 1 depicted a Sasanian embassy to Pulakeshin's court. The painting depicts several figures in foreign dress: Fergusson identified the dress as Sasanian, and proposed that the Sasanian emperor sent a return embassy to the Chalukya empire. This theory was widely accepted by other scholars, but is no longer considered correct: the painting, which does indeed include the visit of foreigners in Persian or Sasanian dress, actually depicts a scene from the Maha-sudarsana Jataka, in which the enthroned king can be identified as the Buddha in one of his previous births as a King. The inclusion of numerous men in Sasanian clothing in the caves of Ajanta seems to reflect the great number of Sasanian traders or workers in Central India at that time, and the fact that they were an object of intense interest by the Indians.

The good relations between the Indians and the Sasanian Empire encouraged the migration to India of Zoroastrian refugees, who were severely persecuted by Arab-Islamic Colonizers in Persia. They settled on the West coast of the Deccan and established the Parsi Community.

== Religious policy ==
Pulakeshin was a Vaishnavite, as attested by the Lohner copper-plate inscription which calls him a Parama-bhagavata ("devotee of Vishnu"), and the Pimpalner copper-plate inscription which states that he belonged to the line of Vishnu. Several of his inscriptions begin with salutations to Vishnu, and bear seals with emblems that feature Varaha, an incarnation of the deity.

He was tolerant of other sects and faiths. He patronized Jainism: the Meguti Jain temple at Aihole was also built during his reign, by the Jain poet Ravikirrti, who composed the Aihole inscription engraved on the wall of this temple. The construction of the Shaivite Hindu shrines now called the Upper Shivalaya, the Lower Shivalaya, and Malegitti Shivalaya, started during the reign of Pulakeshin II. The Chinese Buddhist pilgrim Xuanzang mentions that there were over 100 Buddhist monasteries in his empire; over 5,000 monks – both Mahayana and Hinayana – lived in these monasteries.

== Cultural activities ==
The Aihole inscription of Pulakeshin II states that he was generous in "bestowing gifts and honours on the brave and the learned". The inscription's composer Ravikirrti, a court poet of Pulakeshin, describes himself as an equal of the great Sanskrit poets Bhasa and Kalidasa.

== Inscriptions ==
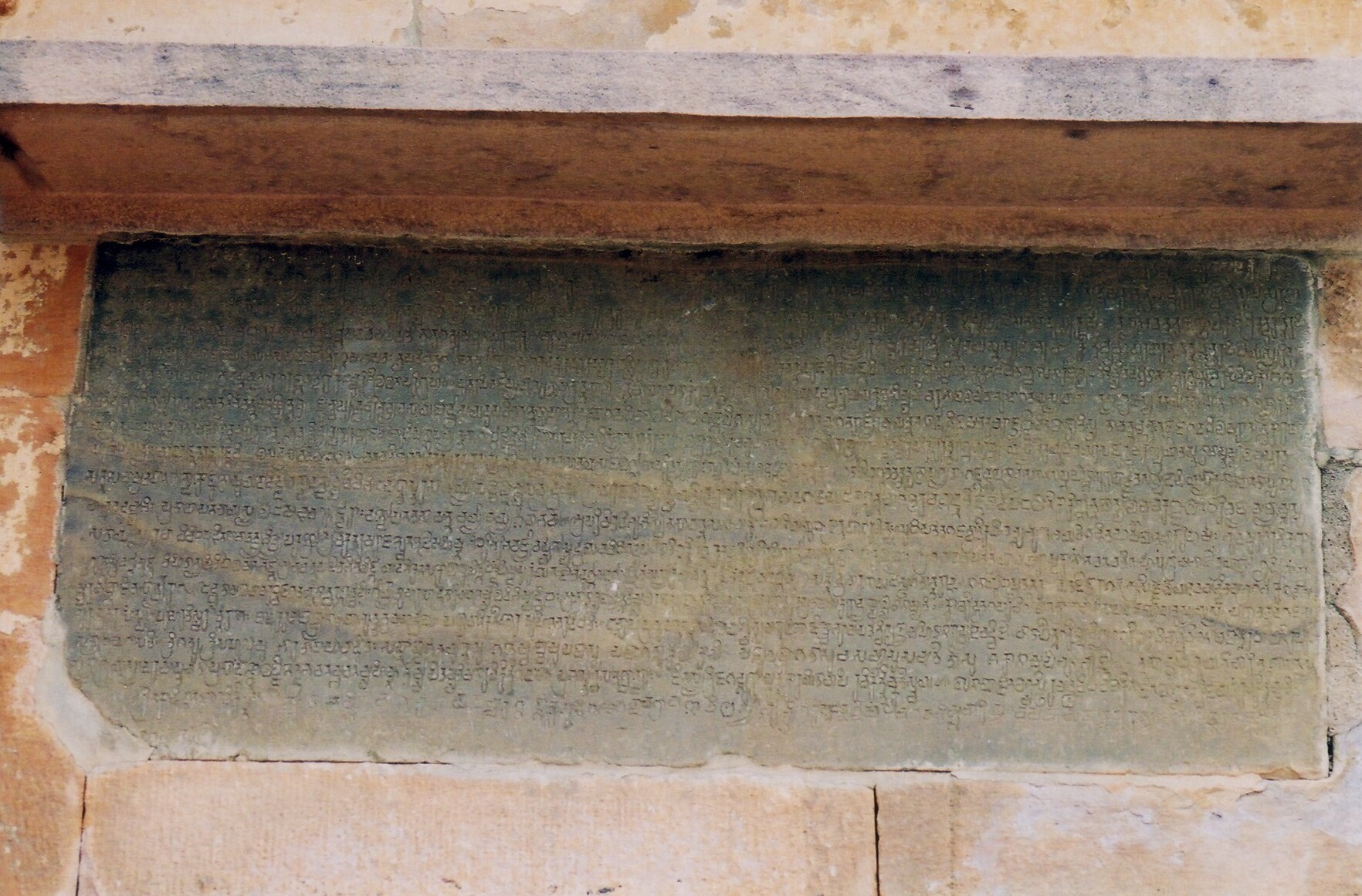
The Aihole inscription composed by Pulakeshin's court poet Ravikirti

Following inscriptions from Pulakeshin's reign have been discovered:

- The Yekkeri rock inscription, which was probably issued in Pulakeshin's first regnal year, contains land records in certain towns said to be owned by the god Mahadeva.
- The Hyderabad copper-plate grant inscription is dated to the Shaka year 532 (expired), and was issued during Pulakeshin's third regnal year. It was issued during the solar eclipse on the Amavasya of the Bhadrapada month, which corresponds to 23 July 613. It records a village grant.
- The Maruturu grant inscription records the grant of the Maruturu village at the instance of the Aluka vassal ruler, and notices the occupation of Pishtapura.
- The Satara grant inscription of Vishnu-vardhana refers to him as the crown-prince.
- The Lohner (Nashik district) inscription is dated to the year 552 of an unspecified calendar era, which must be the Shaka era. It registers grant of the Goviyanaka village to a Brahmana named Dama Dikshita.
- The Kopparam copper-plate inscription, dated to Pulakeshin's 21st regnal year, records the grant of a village in Karma-rashtra region to a Brahmana.
- The Aihole prashasti inscription, composed by Pulakeshin's court poet Ravikirti, records the construction of a Jinendra temple by Ravikirtti, and lists Pulakeshin's military achievements.
- The undated Tummeyanaru grant inscription of Pulakeshin bestows the title Paramaveshvara on him.
- The Chiplun copper-plate inscription records the grant of the Amravatavaka village in Avaretika vishaya (province) to a Brahmana named Maheshvara. It refers to Pulakeshin's maternal uncle and vassal king Shrivallabha Sena-nanda-raja, who belonged to the Sendraka dynasty.
- The Nerur inscription.
- The fragmentary Badami rock inscription refers to the "victorious metropolis" of Vatapi.
- The Hirebidri (Dharwar district) stone inscription records a land grant by Tiraka.
- A Kannada-language inscription from Bellary district "specifies the land measure and the coin to be used at Kurumgodu".
- The undated Peddavaduguru Ishvara temple stone inscription records Pulakeshin's grant of the Elpattu Simbhige village after his subjugation of Ranavikrama. The defeated ruler was probably a king of the Bana dynasty; alternatively, he may be identified with Mangalesha, who bore the title Ranavikrama.
- The Bijapur-Mumbai copper-plate grant inscription records a land grant to Nagasharman of Kaushika gotra, and includes a prashasti (praise) of the dynasty and its kings. The granted land was located in the Brahmana-Vataviya villages situated on the banks of the Godavari River (identified with modern Brahmangaon and Wadvali, east of Paithan, in Aurangabad district). The copper plates were purchased by Raghuvir Pai of Mumbai from a scrap-vendor of Bijapur in the 1990s. The inscription was unreadable because of corrosion, but Shreenand L. Bapat of Bhandarkar Oriental Research Institute cleaned it and published it in 2017. It is written in Sanskrit language and inscribed in a southern variety of the Brahmi script. It was issued on the occasion of a lunar eclipse on a full-moon day in the Vaishakha month of Pulakeshin's ninth regnal year, which corresponds to 4 April 619 CE.

The following inscriptions are attributed to Pulakeshin's reign, but are considered spurious by modern scholars:

- The Kandalgaon copper-plate inscription, dated to Pulakeshin's fifth regnal year, records the grant of the Pirigipa village on Revati island. It is considered spurious because its script features irregular characters and its language is very inaccurate. Additionally, its seal and opening matter are different from other Chalukya inscriptions, and it contains a faulty description of Pulakeshin.
- The Lakshmeshvara inscription records the grant of a field to the chaitya of Shankha Jinendra. It is considered spurious because of "late script and irregular dating".
- The Pimpalner copper-plate inscription, considered spurious for the same reasons as the Lakshmeshvara inscription, records the grant of the Pippalanagara to Nagarasvami Dikshita.

== In popular culture ==
- Several Kannada groups demanded the installation of Pulakeshin II's statue at Badami, Karnataka, to celebrate the great "kannada" emperor of past who they claimed was being ignored by the Karnataka Government.
- The 1967 Kannada film Immadi Pulikeshi starring Dr. Rajkumar which was based on the life of Pulakeshin II.
- The Tamil-language historical novel Sivagamiyin Sapatham (1948) by Kalki Krishnamurthy fictionalizes the historical events around Pulakeshin II laying siege to Kanchi, and Narasimhavarman I avenging this by attacking Vatapi, the capital of the Chalukyas.

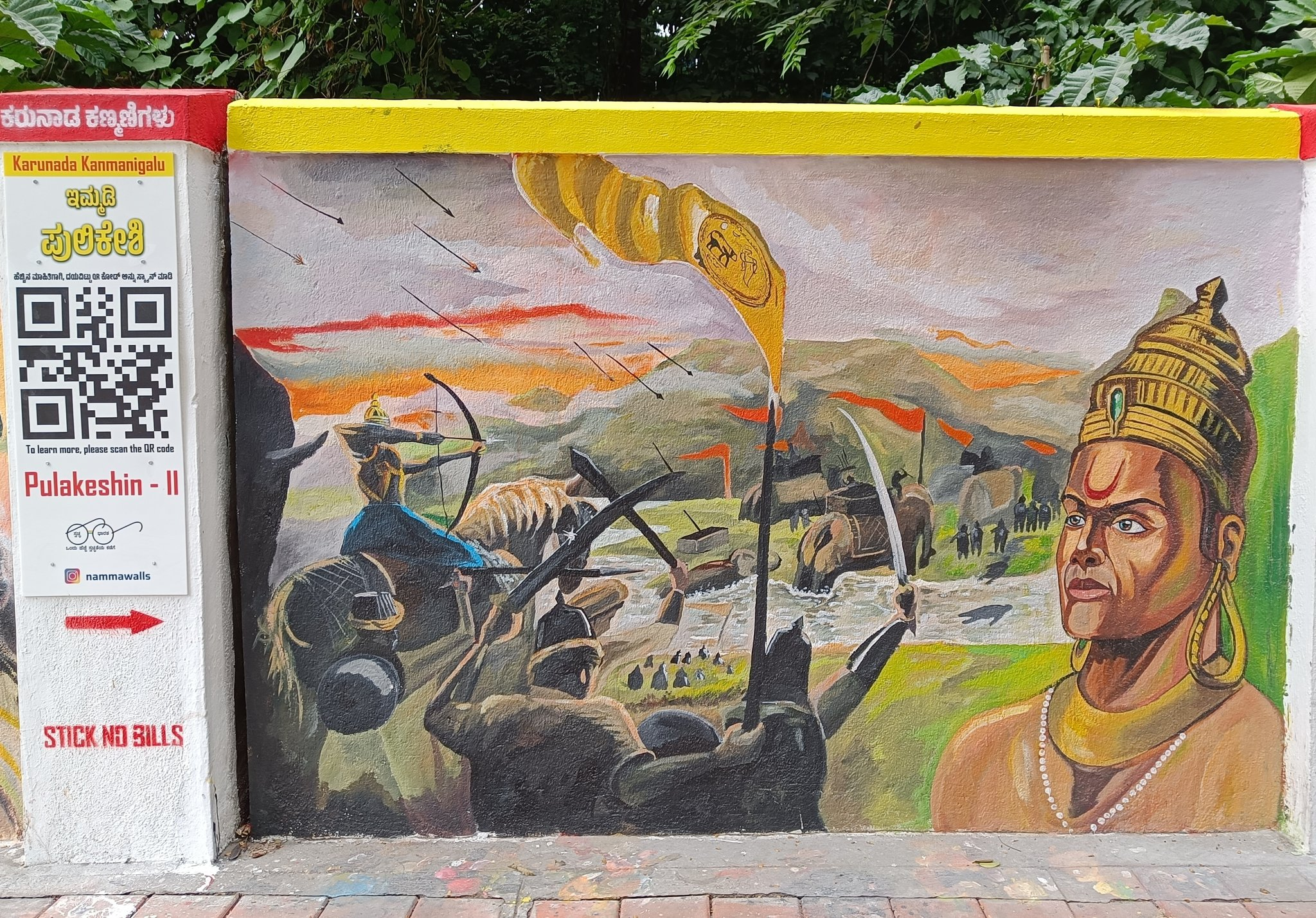
Painting of Pulakeshin II in Bengaluru

== See also ==
- Political history of medieval Karnataka
- Timeline of Karnataka
- History of South India
- Sivagamiyin sabadham, a historical novel featuring Pulakeshin II
- Immadi Pulikeshi (film), a Kannada-language film based on the life of Pulakeshin II
