= Chalukyas of Navasarika =

Former Indian dynasty

Find spots of the inscriptions issued by the Chalukyas of Navasarika

The Chalukyas (IAST: Cālukya) of Navasarika (modern Navsari) were an Indian dynasty that ruled parts of present-day Gujarat and Maharashtra during 7th and 8th centuries, as vassals of the Chalukyas of Vatapi. They are also known as the "Early Chalukyas of Gujarat" (as opposed to the later Chalukyas of Gujarat).

In the late 660s, the Vatapi Chalukya king Vikramaditya I appointed his brother Dharashraya Jayasimhavarman as the governor of the north-western parts of his kingdom, which included southern Gujarat (Lata), Nashik region, and northern Konkan. Dharashraya's eldest son Shryashraya Shiladitya died before him, and he was succeeded by his younger sons, first Jayashraya Mangalarasa, and then Avanijanashraya Pulakeshin. Avanijanashraya is best known for repulsing an Arab invasion from the Umayyad Caliphate near Navsari, a feat recorded in his 738-739 inscription. After his reign, the history of this Chalukya branch is uncertain: their territory subsequently came under the Rashtrakuta control.

== Dharashraya Jayasimhavarman ==
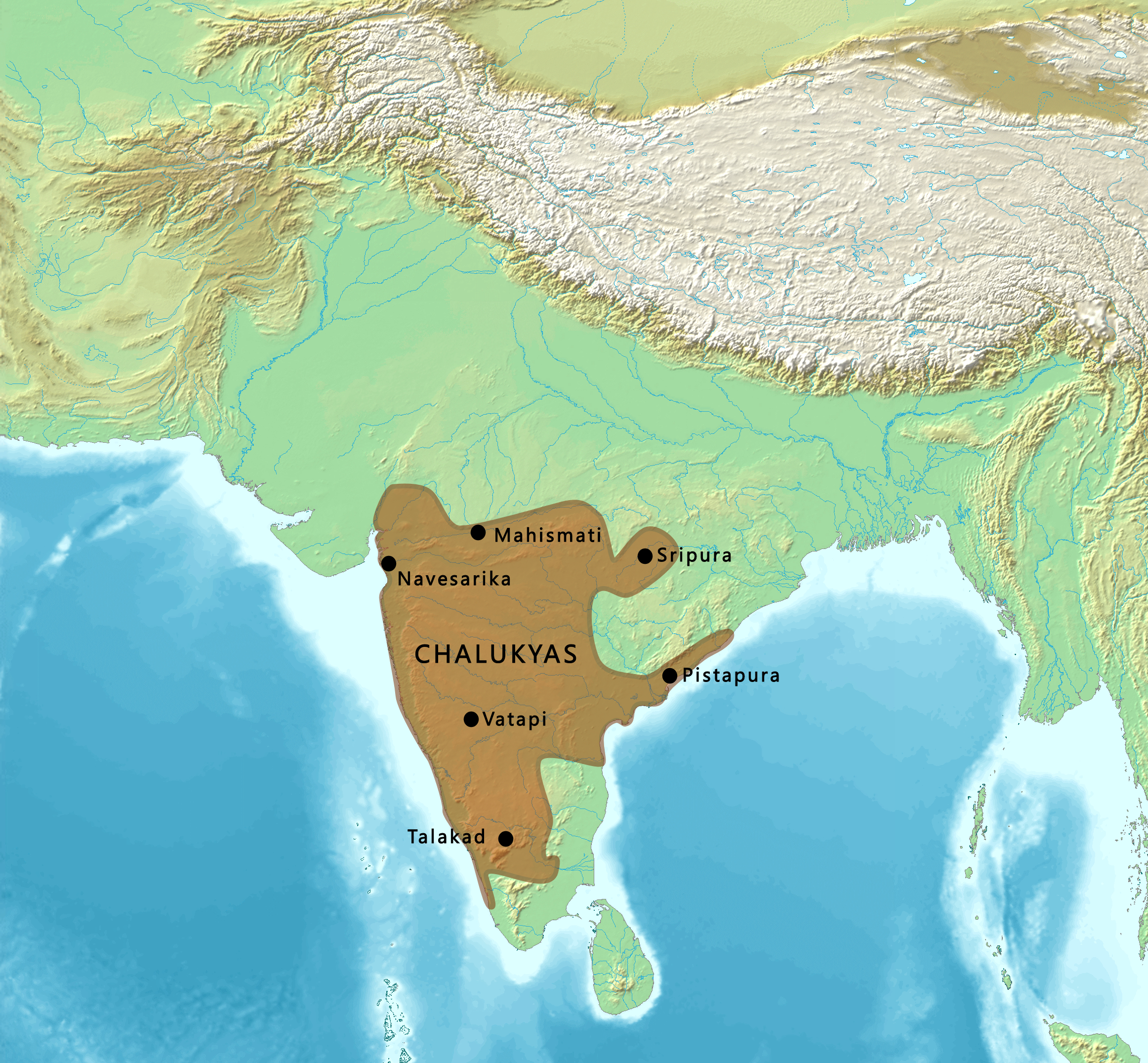
Chalukya Empire at its largest extent

The Navsari branch of the Chalukyas was established by Dharashraya Jayasimhavarman (IAST: Dharāśraya Jaya-siṃha-varman), who was a son of the Vatapi Chalukya king Pulakeshin II, and a younger brother of Pulakeshin's successor Vikramaditya I. Sometime before 667-670 CE, Vikramaditya appointed Dharashraya as the governor of the north-western Chalukya territories, which included parts of present-day southern Gujarat, and the Konkan and Nashik region of Maharashtra.

Dharashraya is attested by his Nashik inscription, which is dated to 20 or 21 March 685 (year 436 of the Kalachuri era). This Sanskrit-language inscription records the grant of the Dhondhaka village in the Nasikya vishaya (Nashik province) to a Brahmana named Trivikrama.

The Nashik inscription states that Dharashraya defeated and routed the army of a king named Vajjada, between the Mahi and the Narmada rivers. Historian V. V. Mirashi theorizes that Vajrata invaded the Gurjara kingdom, whose ruler Dadda III was a Chalukya vassal; the Chalukya emperor dispatched Dharashraya to repulse the invader. However, there is no concrete proof to support this theory. Historian Shyam Manohar Mishra theorizes that Vajjada may have been another name for Dadda III. It is possible that this Vajjada is same as the Vajrata, who according to a Samangad inscription, was defeated by the Rashtrakuta king Dantidurga. It is likely that Dharashraya's campaign against Vajjada was ordered by his overlord and nephew Vinayaditya (the successor of Vikramaditya I), who wanted to expand the Chalukya power in the north.

=== Shryashraya Shiladitya ===
Dharashraya's eldest son was Shryashraya Shiladitya (IAST: Śrayāśraya Śilādtiya). An inscription of Shryashraya, issued by him as the crown prince (yuvaraja), is dated to 23 May 668 (year 420 of the Kalachuri era). Its find spot is unknown. It is written in Sanskrit language using an early form of the Telugu-Kannada alphabet. It records the grant of Mudgapadra village to migrant Brahmana cousins Revaditya and Varasyaka by Dharashraya and Shryashraya. The inscription was issued from Navasarika (Navsari) and its text was composed by Dhananjaya.

A Surat inscription of Shryashraya, also in Sanskrit language, is dated to 28 January 671 (Kalachuri year 421). It records the grant of the Asatti village to Bhogikasvamin. Another of his Sanskrit inscriptions, found at Surat, is dated 692-693 (Kalachuri year 443: the date can be read as 2 August 692 CE, assuming that the inscription was issued in the Kalachuri year 443; or as 23 July 693 CE, assuming that it was issued after the expiry of the Kalachuri year 443). The inscription was issued from Kusumeshvara, and records the grant of a field in the Osumbhala village to Matrishvara Dikshita.

Shryashraya appears to have died before his father Dharashraya; therefore, Dharashraya was succeeded by his second eldest son Jayashraya Mangalarasa, who was succeeded by Avanijanashraya Pulakeshin, another of Dharashraya's sons. Tribhuvanashraya Nagavardhana, a fourth son of Dharashraya, is attested by an inscription found at Nirpan village of Maharashtra. This inscription records the grant of the Belegrama village to the shrine of the deity Kapaleshvara, but is considered spurious by historians.

== Jayashraya Mangalarasa ==
Jayashraya Mangalarasa (IAST: Jayāśraya Maṅgalarasa-rāja) was nominally a vassal of the Chalukya king Vinayaditya, but appears to have been practically independent.

The Manor inscription of Mangalarasa is dated to 7 April 691 (year 613 of the Shaka era). This Sanskrit language inscription describes Mangalarasa as a crown prince, and records the grant of some villages and other land to the Sun temple at Manapura. It indicates that Mangalarasa bore the titles Prithvi-vallabha, Yuddhamalla, and Vinayaditya.

The Diveagar inscription issued during Mangalarasa's reign is dated to 727-728 (Shaka 649). It records the grant of the Talavallika village by prince Dharashraya Jayasimha to the goddess Katyayani, whose statue was located on the bank of a temple tank in Kadadroho-Votinera.

The Valsad (Balsar) inscription of Mangalarasa is dated to 731-732 (Shaka 653). It describes him as "Raja Vinayaditya Yuddhamalla Mangalarasa".

The Rashtrakuta chief Indra I forcibly abducted Bhavanaga, a daughter or niece of Mangalarasa, from a marriage pandal at Kaira. Kaira was located in the traditional Maitraka territory; therefore, historian A. S. Altekar theorizes that Bhavanaga was to be married to a Maitraka prince. On the other hand, historian Shyam Manohar Mishra theorizes that Mangalarasa had conquered Kaira from the Maitrakas by this time.

== Avani-janashraya Pulakeshin ==
Expansion of the Umayyad Caliphate during 661–750

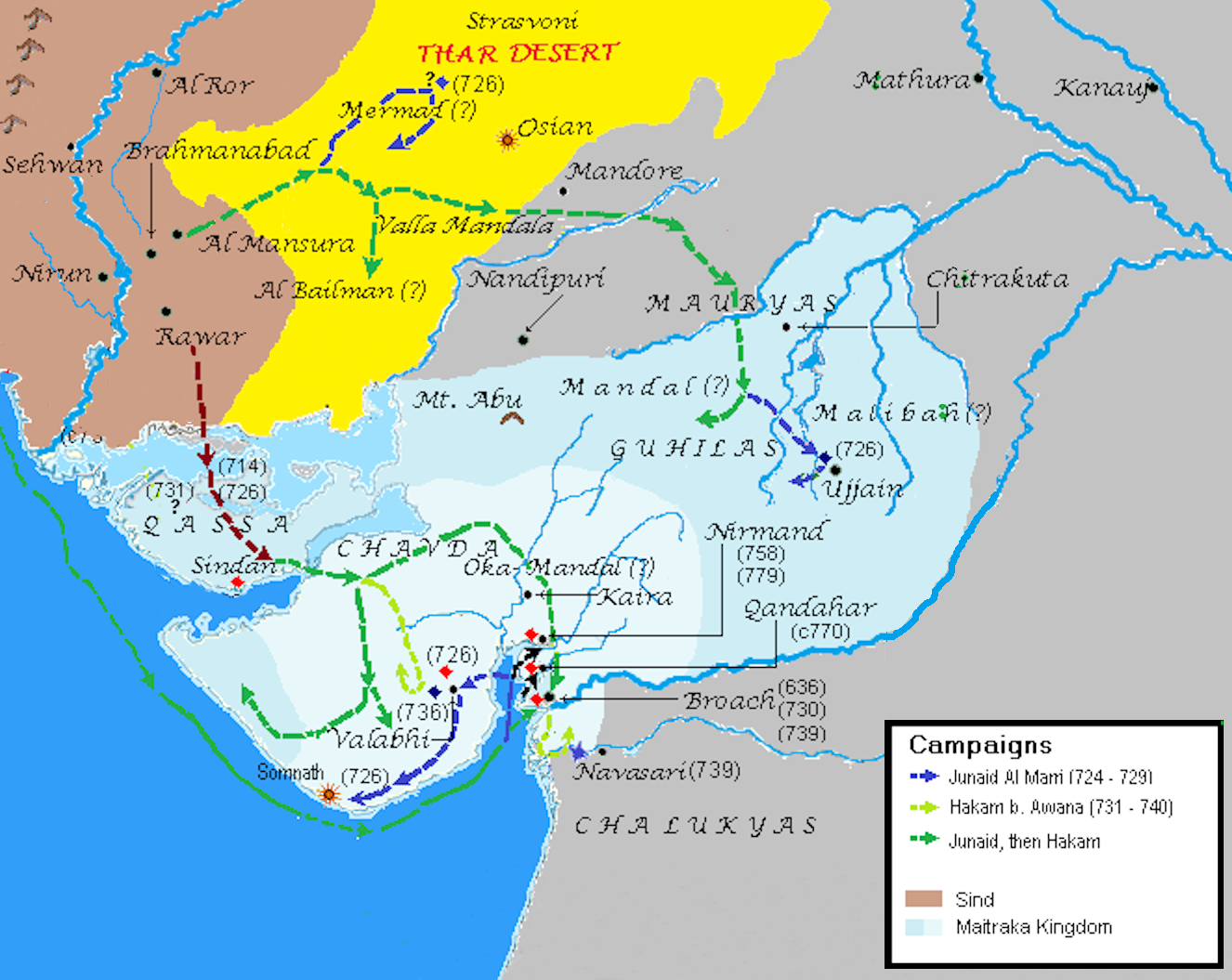
Campaigns from the Caliphal province of Sind into Gujarat (724-740 CE). Avanijanashraya ultimately repulsed these attacks. Desert areas (Thar Desert) Caliphal province of Sind (712-854 CE) Maitraka Kingdom (c.475–c.776 CE)

Mangalarasa's younger brother and successor Avani-janashraya Pulakeshin (IAST: Avani-janāśraya Pulakeśi-rāja) ascended the throne sometime between 731 and 739. He is attested by a Sanskrit inscription, which is known as the Navsari inscription, although its exact find spot is not known. The Epigraphical Society of India received it from a resident of Satem village of Navsari district. It is dated to the year 490 of the Kalachuri era; the date can be interpreted as 1 November 738 (assuming current year i.e. it was issued in the 490th year of the Kalachuri era) or 21 October 739 (assuming expired year i.e. it was issued after 490 years of the era had been completed).

The inscription records Avanijanashraya's repulsion of an Arab invasion from the Umayyad Caliphate. It states that the Tajikas (the Arabs) had advanced up to Navsari after plundering the kingdoms of the Saindhavas, Kachchhelas, Saurashtra, Chavotkas, Mauryas, the Gurjaras, and others. The forces of Avanijanashraya defeated the invaders after a fierce battle.

As a result of this success, Avanijanashraya's overlord conferred several titles upon him, including "solid pillar of Dakshinapatha" (Dakshinapathasadhara), "ornament of the Chalukya family" (Challuki-kulalankara), "beloved of the earth" (Prithvi-vallabha), and "the repeller of the unrepellable" (Anivartaka-nivartayitri). The overlord was the Vatapi Chalukya ruler Vikramaditya II, although the inscription doesn't mention his name, simply calling him "Vallabha Narendra".

Avanijanashraya appears to have annexed the former Gurjara territory to the Chalukya kingdom after repulsing the Arabs. He became the most powerful ruler of the Navsari Chalukya family, and assumed the title Paramabhattaraka. His use of this title, usually borne by the sovereign rulers, cannot be explained with certainty. It is possible that it signifies his declaration of independence; alternatively, it is possible that he remained a Chalukya vassal, and the assumption of the title was just meant for glorification.

The Chalukyas of Navasarika were ultimately supplanted by the Rashtrakutas in the 8th century.
