= Hamirpur Lok Sabha constituency =

Hamirpur Lok Sabha constituency may refer to these electoral constituencies in India:

- Hamirpur, Himachal Pradesh Lok Sabha constituency
- Hamirpur, Uttar Pradesh Lok Sabha constituency

== See also ==
- Hamirpur (disambiguation)
