= Hamirpur district =

Hamirpur district may refer to these districts in India:

- Hamirpur district, Himachal Pradesh
- Hamirpur district, Uttar Pradesh

== See also ==
- Hamirpur (disambiguation)
