= Hamirpur =

Hamirpur may refer to:

== Himachal Pradesh ==
- Hamirpur, Himachal Pradesh, India
  - Hamirpur district, Himachal Pradesh, district of the above town
  - Hamirpur, Himachal Pradesh Assembly constituency
  - Hamirpur, Himachal Pradesh Lok Sabha constituency

== Uttar Pradesh ==
- Hamirpur, Uttar Pradesh, India
  - Hamirpur district, Uttar Pradesh
  - Hamirpur, Uttar Pradesh Assembly constituency
  - Hamirpur, Uttar Pradesh Lok Sabha constituency
- Hamirpur, Mainpuri, India

== West Bengal ==
- Hamirpur, a village in Ramnagar II community development block, Purba Medinipur district

== See also ==
- Hamirpur district (disambiguation)
- Hamirpur Lok Sabha constituency (disambiguation)
- Hamir (disambiguation)
- Hammira (disambiguation)
