= Hammira =

Hammira is a Sanskritized form the Arabic title Amir, adopted as a given name by the early medieval Indian rulers. It may refer to:

- Hammiradeva (r. c. 1283-1301), a king of the Chahamana dynasty of north-western India
  - Hammira Mahakavya, 15th-century Sanskrit epic about the king
  - Hamir Raso, 18th or 19th-century Hindi poem about the king
  - Hameer Hath, 1964 Indian Hindi-language film about the king by Jaswant Jhaveri
- Hammiravarman (r. c. 1288-1311), a king of the Chandela dynasty of central India
- Hammir Singh (r. c. 1314-1378), a king of the Sisodia dynasty of Mewar in north-western India
- Hamir Singh II, maharana of Mewar from 1772–1778
- Bir Hambir, 49th king of Mallabhum
- Hambirrao Mohite, military commander of the Maratha Empire
- A common title used for the invading Muslim kings in early medieval Indian Sanskrit texts

== See also ==
- Hamir (disambiguation)
- Hamira, town in Kapurthala, Punjab, India
  - Hamira railway station
- Hameer, a Hindustani classical raga
- Hamirpur (disambiguation)
- Suratrana, Sanskrit transliteration of sultan
- Balhara (title), Arabic transliteration of Sanskrit Vallabha
