= Hamir =

Hamir may refer to:

- Hamir, a pigeon in the 2006 Disney animated film The Wild
- Hameer, a Hindustani classical raga also spelt Hamir
- Hameer (film), a 2017 Gujarati film
- Hammiradeva, also known as Hamir Dev, 13th-century Chahamana king of Ranthambore, India
- Hammir Singh, 14th-century ruler of the state of Mewar in India
- Hamir Singh II, maharana of Mewar from 1772–1778
- Rana Hamir Singh, 26th rana of Umerkot
- Bir Hambir, 49th king of Mallabhum
- Hambirrao Mohite, military commander of the Maratha Empire
- Hameersingh Bhayal, Indian politician
- Hamir bin Hasim, Malaysian killer

== See also ==
- Hammira (disambiguation)
- Hamirpur (disambiguation)
