= Vikramaditya I =

Chalukya Emperor from 655 to 680

- Maharajadhiraja

Chalukyan Emperor
- Reign: c. 655 – c. 680
- Predecessor: possibly minor son of Chandraditya, with Vijaya-Bhattarika as regent
- Successor: Vinayaditya
- Dynasty: Chalukyas of Vatapi
- Father: Pulakeshin II
- Mother: A daughter of Durvinita

Vikramaditya I (reigned 655–680) was the third son and followed his father, Pulakeshi II on to the Chalukya throne. He restored order in the fractured empire and made the Pallavas retreat from the capital Vatapi.

== Titles ==
Vikramaditya inherited the traditional titles of the dynasty, including Satyashraya ("refuge of truth") and Shri-prithvi-vallabha ("lord of goddess of wealth and earth"; variants include Shri-vallabha and Vallabha). He also bore the titles Maharajadhiraja ("king of great kings"), Rajadhiraja ("king of kings"), Parameshvara ("Supreme Lord"), and Bhattaraka ("great lord").

His titles indicative of his military power include Rana-rasika ("lover of war"), Anivarita ("unopposed"), and Raja-malla ("royal wrestler").

== Early life ==
Vikramaditya was one of the several sons of the powerful Chalukya Emperor Pulakeshin II, as attested by the contemporary records of the family. The records of the later Chalukyas of Kalyani, who claimed descent from Vikramaditya's family, describe him as a son of Pulakeshin's son Adityavarman. These records, such as the Kauthem inscription and Ranna's Gadaayuddha, can be dismissed as inaccurate.

Pulakeshin II was defeated and probably killed during the Pallava invasion of the Chalukya capital Vatapi around c. 642 CE. The Chalukya history over the next decade is unclear: it is possible that after Pulakeshin's death, his son Adityavarman held the throne, followed by Adityavarman's son Abhinavaditya, and then by Pulakeshin's son Chandraditya. After Chandraditya, his wife Vijaya-Bhattarika appears to have acted as a regent for their minor son. During her regency, Vikramaditya appears to have risen to prominence as the supreme commander of the Chalukya army, becoming the de facto ruler in the process.

The inscriptions of Vikramaditya state that he obtained the "regal fortune of his father which had been concealed by three kings", and thus "made the entire burden of royalty rest upon one person". Historian K. A. Nilakanta Sastri theorized that beside the Pallava king, the two other kings referred to in this sentence were Adityavarman and Chandraditya. According to this theory, the Chalukya kingdom was divided among the three brothers and the Pallavas after Pulakeshin's death, and Vikramaditya united it by subjugating the others. In his support, Sastri cited the undated Kurnool copper-plate inscription which states that Vikramaditya ascended the throne after "conquering all his kinsmen". However, this inscription is considered spurious, and Sastri himself admitted that its authenticity is doubtful. There is no evidence that the Chalukya kingdom was partitioned among the three brothers. Had Vikramaditya been one of the rival claimants to the throne after Pulakehsin's death, he would have dated the start of his reign from c. 642 CE, not c. 655 CE, in his inscriptions. Moreover, the Kochare and Nerur inscriptions of his sister-in-law Vijaya-Bhattarika mention him positively, but do not accord any royal titles to him. Based on these evidences, scholars such as D. C. Sircar theorize that Vikramaditya fought against the Pallavas as a subordinate of his brothers, and ascended the throne only after their deaths. The term "three kings" apparently refers to the Chola, Chera, and Pandya rulers who had allied with the Pallavas.

Besides Adityavarman and Chandraditya, two other brothers of Vikramaditya are known: Ranaragha-varman and Dharashraya Jayasimha-varman. The Honnur copper-plate inscription states that Ranaragha was his elder brother, and donated some land to Brahmanas during his reign. In accordance with the contemporary tradition, Ranaragha would have been ahead of Vikramaditya in the precedence to the throne: it is not clear why Vikramaditya became the king instead of him, and no other surviving source mentions him. Dharashraya Jayasimha was Vikramaditya's younger brother, and governed the north-western part of the Chalukya Empire as his subordinate.

The c. 674 CE (Shaka year 596) Gadval inscription of Vikramaditya is dated to his 12th regnal year, which suggests that he ascended the throne in c. 655 CE (Shaka year 577). This may have happened possibly after the son of Chandraditya and Vijaya died (naturally or otherwise).

== Military career ==
According to Durga Prasad Dikshit, Vikramaditya I first sought to recover the territories lost to the Pallavas following their occupation of the Chalukya capital. Dikshit states that Vikramaditya I "tried to liberate his lost territory from the Pallavas after his reoccupation of the Chalukyan metropolis", marking the restoration of Chalukya control over Vatapi before undertaking further campaigns against the Pallavas. Vikramaditya, with the help of his maternal grandfather Bhuvikarma or Durvineet of Western Ganga Dynasty set himself the task of repelling the Pallava invasion and restoring the unity of his father's empire. He was able to end Pallava's occupation, which had lasted for thirteen years and captured Vatapi. He defeated his brothers and other feudatories who wished to divide the empire. Vikramaditya then declared himself king of the Chalukyas (655). He rewarded his younger brother Jayasimhavarma who was loyal to him, with the viceroyalty of Lata in the southern Gujarat.

Vikramaditya continued his enmity with Narasimhavarman's son and successor Mahendravarman II, and later with his son Paramesvaravarman I. Vikramaditya allied himself with the Pallava's other enemy the Pandyan Arikesari Parankusa Maravarman (670 – 700). According to Kumud Chitalia, Narasimhavarman I sent an army under the command of his son Mahendravarman II to invade the south-western part of the Chalukya kingdom. The invasion was defeated by Vikramaditya I's nephew, Satyashraya Śilāditya, who inflicted a crushing defeat on the Pallava army and forced Mahendravarman II to flee the battlefield. Chitalia further states that this incursion probably prompted Vikramaditya I's counter-offensive, and by A.D. 670 he had established a military camp (Mahāskandhāvāra) at Malliyur, a place situated a short distance west of Kanchipuram, during his campaign against the Pallavas. According to Kumud Chitalia, Vikramaditya I's campaigns in Cuddapah, Kurnool, Nellore and Eruva were campaigns of reconquest, restoring Chalukya control over frontier territories that had fallen under Pallava domination after the Pallava occupation of Vatapi, and served as the prelude to his invasion of Pallava territory.

A.D. 670, Vikramaditya I, another of whose names was ' Ranarasika '. Western Chalukya records claim for Vikramaditya that (in or after A.D. 670) he defeated ' Is"vara-Potaraja ', (Parameswaravarman I)and took Kanchi, the Pallava capital, ' but did not destroy it.' According to Kumud Chitalia, taking advantage of the accession of Parameśvaravarman I, Vikramaditya I laid siege to Kanchi and, after defeating Īśvarapotarāja (Parameśvaravarman I), captured the Pallava capital before A.D. 671.

Anirudh Kanisetti writes that following the Chalukya conquest, Kanchi's moat was filled in, its massive ramparts were scaled, and the city was sacked by Vikramaditya I's forces. He further states that the Chalukyas subsequently occupied Mahabalipuram, which was looted after the fall of Kanchi. According to Durga Prasad Dikshit, Vikramaditya I defeated three successive Pallava rulers during his long campaign in the south. His inscriptions proclaim that he "crushed the glory" of Narasimhavarman I (Mahamalla), "destroyed the valour" of Mahendravarman II, and subdued Īśvarapotarāja (Parameśvaravarman I), after which he captured Kanchi. Kumud Chitalia similarly states that Vikramaditya I laid siege to Kanchi, defeated Parameśvaravarman I, and captured the Pallava capital before A.D. 671. She further notes that after routing the Pallavas at Kanchi, Vikramaditya I overran the entire Pallava kingdom and, by A.D. 674, had established his victorious camp at Uragapura (modern Uraiyur), recording his advance into the Chola country, then a Pallava dependency. According to Anirudh Kanisetti, Vikramaditya I "rampaged through Tamilakam" during his southern campaign, restoring Chalukya supremacy in the Deccan. Kanisetti states that while Vikramaditya campaigned across Tamilakam, his son Vinayaditya and grandson Vijayaditya consolidated the Chalukya realm, while his Ganga ally also achieved a series of victories against the Pallavas. According to the Honnur plates of Chalukya Vikramaditya I, dated in his 16th regnal year (circa 670 A.D. -671 A.D.), he camped in Malliyur on his way to Kanchipuram and with the help of the Gangas of Talakkad defeated the Pallavas. According to Benjamin Lewis Rice, the Battle of Bhimesa-grāma resulted in the death of the Pallava king Narasimha Pota Varman, who was "trodden to death by the elephants". Rice further states that Vikramaditya I subsequently defeated the Pallava king Jayateśvara Pota Varman, making "the king, who had never before bowed to any other man, kiss his feet with his crown", a victory for which he claimed the titles Śrī Vallabha and Rāja Malla.

=== Battle of Vilande ===
To avenge the defeat, the Pallava king first waged a war against the Ganga ruler Bhuvikrama, the supporter of the Chalukyas. From the Bedirur grant of Bhuvikrama and Hallegere plates of his brother and successor Sivamara, it is known that in this battle, which occurred at a place called Vilande, Paramesvaravarman I not only faced defeat in the hands of Bhuvikrama, but he was also deprived of his royal necklace.

=== Battle of Peruvallanallur ===
As a result of this aggressive policy of Paramesvaravarman I, he was again attacked by the Chalukyan king Vikramaditya I and seized Kanchipuram after defeating him. According to the Chalukyan records Vikramaditya seems to have pushed on to the south, and he was encamped at Uragapura (Uraiyur) on the south bank of the Kaveri river on April 25 A.D. 674. Where he was opposed by Paramesvaravarman I and the Pandyan king Kochchadaiyan Ranadhira, near Trichinopoly a battle was fought at Peruvalanallur. And the Kendur plates say that Vikramaditya, fought with the Pandyas.We have also Supposed that Pandya king was one of the three confederates who gained the victory at Peruvallanallur. Pallava and Pandya records equally claim that, in this battle the Chalukyas was defeated.The Velvikudi copper plates mention Ranadhira victory over the Karnatas(i.e.,Chalukyas). And bore the title of (Madurakarunatakan). Based on these evidences, scholars such as D. C. Sircar theorize that Vikramaditya fought against the Pallavas as a subordinate of his brothers, and ascended the throne only after their deaths. The term "three kings" apparently refers to the Chola, Chera, and Pandya rulers who had allied with the Pallavas. Vikramaditya evidently had now against him a combination of Pallavas, Pandyas and Cholas.

=== Aftermath ===
Paramesvaravarman then sent an expedition into the Chalukya country. In the ensuing Battle of Puruvalanallur in 674 with Vikramaditya's forces, the Pallavas defeated the Chalukyas. The defeated Chalukyan army was led by Vikramaditya's son and grandson Vinayaditya and Vijayaditya. Pallava king Paramesvaravarman must have mustered his forces and sought the assistance of the Chola, Pandya and Chera of South India in order to give a crushing blow to their common enemy Vikramaditya.The Kanchipuram Inscriptions state that Rajasimha was son of Ugradanda the destroyer of Ranarasika's city and that epithet Ranarasika refer to chalukya king Vikramaditya. The combined forces of these four powers entered the Chalukyan territory and probably sacked and captured Vatapi 'the city of Ranarasika ’ on this occasion. Pallavas went on to occupy many of the Chalukya territories but later left after the chalukyas agreed to pay yearly tributes . After They were routed by Vinayaditya probably in A. D. 678–79, when he was nominated lo the throne as indicated by his Jejuri plates and the Togarchedu grant. Several historians have questioned the historicity of a second Pallava sack of Vatapi during the reign of Parameśvaravarman I. Durga Prasad Dikshit regarded the proposed expedition of Siruthondar as hypothetical and noted that, if such an expedition occurred, it ended in failure, with Vijayāditya, the grandson of Vikramāditya I, possibly defeating the Pallava force. M. S. Nagaraja Rao notes that P. B. Desai considered the alleged second attack to be a fiction and states that Vijayāditya possibly repulsed the Pallava army under Siruthondar. Kumud Chitalia observes that Chalukya inscriptions are silent regarding Siruthondar's alleged expedition and instead credit Vinayāditya with restoring order during Vikramāditya I's southern campaign. K. K. Dasgupta likewise states that while Pallava records refer to pressure on Ranarasika's city, Chalukya records credit Vinayāditya and Vijayāditya with defeating the invading forces, adding that whether Badami itself was actually threatened cannot be established with certainty.

During this time, Jayasimha, brother of Vikramaditya I who ruled as governor of Gujarat province defeated the ruler of Vallabhi, Vajjada the ruler of the Maitraka family. This victory is considered important. The Chalukyan empire however had put the worst behind under Vikramaditya I and recovered most of its territories it controlled under Pulakeshin II.

Vikramaditya I was married to the Western Ganga princess Gangamahadevi. Some historians compare him to his illustrious father Pulakeshin II.

== Death and succession ==
Vikramaditya died in 680 and his son Vinayaditya succeeded him on the Chalukya throne.
