= Suratrana =

Suratrana (IAST: Suratrāṇa, सुरत्राण) is a Sanskrit word that has the literal meaning "protector of gods", but is often used as a transliteration of the Islamic word "Sultan" into Sanskrit. The term consists of two words "sura" (सुर) meaning "deva, gods, deity", and trana (त्राण) meaning "protect, preserve, defend". (Note: Sura, in most contexts means "god, divinity, deity", but also means in other contexts someone "supreme, with superhuman power". A related word Suretara is found in the Bhagavata Purana, which means "other than a Sura, an Asura". The word Trāṇa is found in Vedic literature, such as in Apastamba Mantra Brahmana's section 2.17 and Apastambiya Gryhasutra's section 5.13.)

Suratrana is found in Indian texts and inscriptions, in the post 12th-century medieval period of Hindu-Muslim interaction during Delhi Sultanate and Mughal Empire. For example, the Vilasa grant of Musunuri Prolaya Nayaka in modern Andhra Pradesh, dated to 1330 CE, refers to Ahammada suratrana ("Muslim Sultan", here the Sultan of Delhi). The term Hinduraya Suratrana is found in a long Sanskrit stone inscription in Nāgarī script found at a temple at Hampi in Karnataka and dated to 1344 CE. The term Hindu raya suratrana is also seen in some stone inscriptions found in Andhra Pradesh, the earliest dated to about 1352 CE.

Benjamin Lewis Rice translates Hinduraya Suratrana as "the Suratrana of Hindu Rayas". (Note: Raya is a Sanskrit word and means "king, prince".) Other scholars have interpreted it to mean "the Sultan among Hindu kings" and state this to be an evidence of Islamic political traditions being adopted by Hindu kings. (Note: The Hinduraya suratrana term in inscriptions has been coupled with long brocaded headdress (kullayi) and others shown in some royalty-related reliefs found in Hampi as additional support for the hypothesis that 'Islamicization of Hindu culture' in 14th-century. The long headdress are also seen in the royalty-related and secular artwork in Pattadakal dated from the 7th and 8th century, about 5 centuries before the first Sultanate was formed in South Asia. Similar conical headdress is seen in other sites such as the Ajanta Caves, Ellora Caves, Aihole and Badami, variously dated from the 2nd century CE to 10th century CE.) Scholar Lorenzen sees this evidence of Indian kingdoms recognizing their identity of being "Hindu" and even a religious Hindu identity by early 14th century. Others interpret the term Hinduraya Suratrana to mean "protectors of the gods of (or among) the Hindu kings".

A few other inscriptions in South India use the word Suratrana sometimes in modified form. For example, the Akkalapundi Grant inscription of 1368 CE for Kapaya Nayaka of Warangal who fought the Delhi Sultanate armies, refers to the Nayaka as Andhrasuratranah (the Suratrana of the Andhra). It appears in a Warangal inscription dated to about 1570 CE, for Aravidu king Tirumala I, as Urigola Suratranah. Wagoner interprets it as "Sultan of Warangal".

A related term Hinduravu Suradhani (IAST: Hindurāvu Suradhāni) is found in an Ongole inscription for Sariyapati Timmareddi of Andhra region, and is dated to 1482 CE. According to Wagoner, both Suratrana and Suradhani are transliterations of Sultan. (Note: Sanskrit and Indian languages have distinct letters "l", "r", "tr" and "t"; for example, one nagari versions are "ल", "र", "त्र" and "त" respectively.) Suradhani found in Hindurāvu Suradhāni term is also a composite of two words, "Sura" and "Dhani", with Dhani meaning "possessor, housing, virtuous keeper".

== See also ==
- Hammira, Sanskrit transliteration of emir
- Balhara (title), Arabic transliteration of Sanskrit Vallabha
