= Adityavarman (Chalukya dynasty) =

Chalukya Emperor from 643 to 645

Adityavarma
- Shri-prithvi-vallabha, Maharajadhiraja, Parameshvara

Chalukya king
- Reign: c. 643 – c. 645
- Predecessor: Pulakeshin II
- Successor: possibly Abhinavaditya
- Issue: Abhinavaditya
- Dynasty: Chalukyas of Vatapi
- Father: Pulakeshin II

Adityavarma (r. c. 643–645 CE) was a king of the Chalukya dynasty of Vatapi in southern India. He was a son of Pulakeshin II, who was defeated and probably killed when the Pallavas invaded and captured the Chalukya capital Vatapi. The immediate history of the dynasty after Pulakeshin's death is not clear, but inscriptions of Adityavarma and his son suggest that Adityavarma ruled a weakened Chalukya kingdom for a short period, before his younger brother Vikramaditya I defeated the Pallavas and restored Chalukya power.

== Background ==
Adityavarman was one of the sons of the Chalukya emperor Pulakeshin II. In 642–643 CE, the Pallavas, who were the southern neighbours of the Chalukyas, invaded and captured the Chalukya capital Vatapi. Pulakeshin was probably killed in this conflict.

The history of the Chalukya dynasty over the next decade, when Pulakeshin's other son Vikramaditya I ascended the throne in c. 655, is not clear. It cannot be said with certainty if the Chalukya empire was divided among the various sons of Pulakeshin, or if his successor(s) ruled from other headquarter(s) while the Pallavas occupied Vatapi. Despite this uncertainty, Adityavarman's existence and his rule as the Chalukya king is attested by his Kurnool (Karnul) grant inscription, his son's Nelakunda grant inscription, Someshvara III's Vikramankabhyudaya, and Sarvajnatma's Samkshepa-Shariraka.

The Kurnool inscription does not mention Adityavarman's order of birth among Pulakeshin's sons, and does not mention Vikramaditya.

The 1009 CE Kantheru grant inscription of the later Chalukyas of Kalyani, who claimed descent from the Chalukyas of Badami, names Adityavarman as a son of Nedamari and a grandson of Pulakeshin II. However, this late account contains several inaccuracies, and cannot be considered as reliable.

== Reign ==
Vikramankabhyudaya of the 12th century king Someshvara III, whose dynasty claimed descent from the Chalukyas of Vatapi, states that Adityavarman succeeded his father Pulakeshin.

According to the Kurnool and Nelakunda inscriptions, Adityavarman bore the regnal titles Shri-prithvi-vallabha, Maharajadhiraja, and Parameshvara ("Supreme Lord").

The Kurnool inscription boasts that he possessed the "supreme rule over the whole circuit of earth which had been overcome by the strength of his arm and prowess".

The Kurnool grant inscription is dated to Adityavarman's first regnal year: historian D. P. Dikshit assumes that he may have ruled during c. 643–645 CE, spending most of his time trying to regain the former Chalukya territory from the Pallavas and other enemies. Historian D. C. Sircar theorized that Vikramaditya I and Adityavarman ruled different parts of the Pulakeshin's former empire simultaneously.

== Identification as Vikramditya I ==
Historian T. V. Mahalingam theorized that Adityavarman was simply a former name of Vikramaditya I. His theory is based on the following arguments:

- Adityavarman's Kurnool inscription and Vikramaditya's Gadval inscription feature similar phraseology.
- Adityavarman's Kurnool inscription states that he made the grant for "the merit of his mother and father and himself". Such a statement is found in Vikramaditya's Kurnool inscriptions as well, but is uncommon in the inscriptions of other Chalukya kings. The Navsari inscription of Vikramaditya's younger brother Jayasimha also mentions that Vikramaditya "meditated on the feet of his mother and father": such an expression is not found in other Chalukya records.
- The Chalukya inscriptions issued after the restoration of the Chalukya power mention that Vikramaditya acquired the title Parameshvara ("Supreme Lord") by subjugating the hostile kings. Adityavarman also bore the title Parameshvara.

Historian D. P. Dikshit disputes this identification based on the following arguments:

- The similarity between the inscriptions of the succeeding kings can be explained by the fact that such records were drafted by state officials on the lines of the previous records.
- The grant inscriptions only furnish a genealogy of the king, not a chronology of succession. This explains why Adityavarman's records do not mention Vikramaditya, and vice versa.
- The records of the later Chalukyas of Kalyani, although unreliable, mention Adityavarman. Had Adityavarman not been a distinct, sovereign king, he would have been forgotten by the time of the later Chalukyas.
- The Nelakunda inscription of Adityavarman's son Abhinavaditya suggests that both men were sovereign rulers, and that Abhinavadiya succeeded Adityavarman.

== Successor ==
The Nelakunda inscription of Adityavarman's son Abhinavaditya gives both men the imperial title Parameshvara, which suggests that Abhinavaditya succeeded his father as the Chalukya sovereign.
