= Abhinavaditya =

Chalukya Emperor from 645 to 646

- Shri-prithvi-vallabha, Maharajadhiraja, Parameshvara

Chalukya king
- Reign: c. 645 – c. 646
- Predecessor: Adityavarman
- Successor: Chandraditya
- Dynasty: Chalukyas of Vatapi
- Father: Abhinavaditya

Abhinavaditya (r. c. 645–646 CE) was a king of the Chalukya dynasty of Vatapi in southern India. He appears to have succeeded his father Adityavarman on the weakened Chalukya throne, in the period following the death of his grandfather Pulakeshin II. He appears to have died heirless, and was probably succeeded by his uncle Chandraditya.

== Background ==
Abhinavaditya's father Adityavarman was one of the sons of the powerful Chalukya emperor Pulakeshin II. After Pulakeshin II was defeated and probably killed during a Pallava invasion in 642–643 CE, Adityavarman appears to have held the weakened Chalukya throne, as attested by the Kurnool (Karnul) grant inscription. Abhinavaditya seems to have succeeded his father on the throne, as attested by his Nelkunda grant inscription. He probably died heirless, as the next known person to have held the Chalukya throne was his uncle Chandraditya. The Chalukya power was subsequently restored by Chandraditya's younger brother Vikramaditya I. Another possibility is that Abhinavaditya and Vikramaditya belonged to two different branches of the family, and ruled different parts of the Pulakeshin's former empire simultaneously.

Abhinavaditya's Nelkunda inscription is the only historical source that mentions him. The subsequent Chalukya records presumably omit his name because he was not in direct line of succession of the subsequent rulers such as Vikramaditya I. Historian D. P. Diskhit assumes that he probably ruled between c. 645 and 647 CE, and lost his life while trying to restore the Chalukya power.

== Nelkunda inscription ==
The Nelkunda copper-plate inscription of Abhinavaditya came to the notice of the Mysore State's archaeology department in the 1950s. The copper-plates were originally in the possession of the family of Pujar Bhimanna, a resident of the Ganjigatte village near Holalkere. The inscription was later given to the archaeological museum at Chitradurga.

The inscription is in form of a set of three copper-plates tied using a circular ring, which is fastened to a circular seal containing a boar emblem. The first and the third plates are engraved only on one side, while the second plate is engraved on both the sides.

The writing comprises 28 Sanskrit language lines inscribed in the 7th century Telugu-Kannada alphabet. The inscription first praises the foot of the Hindu god Hari (Vishnu) that crushed the demon (Bali), followed by a prashasti (eulogy) of the Chalukya dynasty. The genealogy portion of the prashasti mentions Abhinavaditya, his father Adityavarman, and his grandfather Pulakeshin II; all three kings are accorded the imperial titles Maharajadhiraja and Parameshvara. Like his grandfather, Abhinavaditya is also accorded the title Satyashraya-Prithvi-vallabha.

Next, the inscription records Abhinavaditya's grant of the Nelkunda village, located in the Uchcha-shringa vishaya (district) to a Brahmana named Kuppa-sharman. Nelkunda can be identified with present-day Nalkunda in Davanagere district of Karnataka; the name Uchcha-shringa is preserved in the name of the present-day Uchangidurga village in the same district. The donee Kuppa-sharman belonged to the Devarata-Kaushika gotra (lineage), and was well-versed in the Vedas and the Vedangas. The record ends with imprecatory verses cursing anyone who violates the grant deed. The grant was made on the full-moon day of the Bhadrapada month of the Hindu calendar; the inscription states that it was made during the "victorious reign" of king Abhinavaditya, but does not specify the regnal year.
