= Vijayaditya =

Chalukya emperor from 696 to 733

Chalukya king
- Reign: July 696 – 733
- Predecessor: Vinayaditya
- Successor: Vikramaditya II
- Issue: Vikramaditya II
- Dynasty: Chalukyas of Vatapi
- Father: Vinayaditya

Vijayaditya (died 733) was the Chalukya emperor from July 696 until his death in 733. He succeeded his father, Vinayaditya on to the Chalukya throne. His long reign was marked by general peace and prosperity. Vijayaditya also built a number of temples. He fought against the Pallavas and extracted tributes from Paramesvaravarman II. The Alupas of South Canara who were loyal to the Chalukyas and led by Alupa Chitravahana, brother-in-law of Vijayaditya defeated a Pandyan invasion of Mangalore in 705. Vijayaditya was succeeded by his son Vikramaditya II in 733. Vijayaditya ruled for 18 years.

== Source of information ==
Vijayaditya donated a village named Kadamma, located to the south of Purikaranagara, to Sankha-Jinendra (Neminatha) Jain Basadi at Lakshmeshwara, Gadag district in 730 CE.

The Anesejjaya Jain basadi was built by "Kumkumamahadevi", the younger sister of the Chalukya king Vijayaditya.

The Shiggaon plates inscription, dated Saka 630, regnal year 11, records Vijayaditya’s gifts to a Jain monastery at Puligere. Contemporary records indicate that Vijayaditya was a follower of Jainism. The inscription also refers to him with the title Bhaṭṭāraka, which in the Digambara Jain tradition denotes a senior religious authority overseeing prathimādhāri śrāvakas and lay followers.

Epigraphist "K. V. Ramesh" notes that the title Bhaṭṭāraka (male) or Bhaṭṭārikā (female) is the highest monastic administrative rank among Digambara Jainism and denotes senior religious authority, not a designation for ordinary śrāvakas or laypersons. In the Digambara tradition, ordinary śrāvakas and prathimādhāris (those who maintain an image or follow daily devotion) practice the core religious duties, but only those who have taken advanced monastic or administrative responsibilities and strictly follow the dharma in its deepest sense are elevated to the rank of Bhaṭṭāraka or Bhaṭṭārikā.

Preceded by Vinayaditya	Chalukyas; 696–733	Succeeded by Vikramaditya II
