= Vinayaditya of Vatapi =

Chalukya Emperor from 681 to 696

- Shri-Prithivi-Vallabha; Satyasraya; Yuddhamalla; Rajasraya

Chalukya Emperor
- Reign: c. 681 – c. 696
- Predecessor: Vikramaditya I
- Successor: Vijayaditya
- Issue: Vijayaditya
- Dynasty: Chalukyas of Vatapi
- Father: Vikramaditya I

Vinayaditya ruled the Chalukya kingdom from 681 to 696. He was the son of Vikramaditya I and the successor of the Chalukya kingdom. Similar to his forefathers, he took up titles such as "Shri-Prithivi-Vallabha", "Satyasraya", "Yuddhamalla" and "Rajasraya". He carried campaigns against the Pallavas, Kalabhras, Haihayas, Vilas, Cholas, Pandyas, Gangas and many more. He levied tribute from the kings of Kavera, Parasika (Iran), Sinhala (Ceylon). He acquired the banner called Palidhvaja by defeating the Lord of the entire Uttarapatha. (The name of the Lord of Uttarapatha is not known or mentioned anywhere)

== Northern expedition ==
Inscriptions speak of many victories to Vinyaditya. He had fought alongside his father against the Pallavas. According to the Jejuri record of 684, he defeated the Pallavas, Kalabhras, Keralas (Cheras, the rulers of western Tamil Nadu and central Kerala) and the Kalachuris of central India. From the Kolhapur plates of 678, it can be seen that he defeated the kingdoms of Lanka and Kamera, which according to Dr. S. Nagaraju was Khmer or Cambodia. The Vakkaleri plates confirm the Chalukya levying tribute on Kamera, Lanka and Parasika (Persia).

According to Dr. Sircar, it is very possible that the chiefs of Lanka and Persia may have sought protection from the Chalukya, considering the unstable political situation in those countries. During this time, Persia was under Islamic invasion. Vinayaditya sent an expedition to the north under the command of his son Vijayaditya. According to some accounts, Vijayaditya was captured and held prisoner and after a period of incarceration, escaped and returned to the Chalukyan kingdom to be crowned the monarch of the empire. Vinayaditya sent an ambassador to the Chinese court in 692. Vijayaditya succeeded his father in 696.

== Rule ==
Vinayaditya converted a village named Hadagile in Beluvala-300 into a dana-shala (charity-house) in year 683.

Preceded by Vikramaditya I	King of the Chalukya dynasty 680–696	Succeeded by Vijayaditya
