= Prithvi-vallabha (title) =

Shri Prithvi-vallabha (IAST: Pṛthvīvallabha), or Vallabha-rāja, was an imperial title used by several kings that ruled in present-day India, including the Chalukyas of Vatapi and the Rashtrakutas. It is a Kshatriya title that translates as "Lord of the Earth," or alternatively as "Husband of the Earth and Her Fortunes." and this title was also associated with Jainism, as it is frequently found in inscriptions of Jain kings and donors across Deccan.

== Chalukyas of Vatapi ==
All the sovereign rulers of the Vatapi Chalukya dynasty bore the title Shri-prithvi-vallabha, which means "the husband of the goddess of fortune and the Earth". Mangalesha bore the exact title of Prithvi-vallabha, as attested by the Mahakuta inscriptions. The Manor inscription of the Chalukya governor Jayashraya Mangalarasa, dated to 7 April 691 (year 613 of the Shaka era), also mentions Prithvi-vallabha as one of his titles. His son Avanijanashraya Pulakeshin also bore the title.

== Rashtrakutas ==
Among the Rashtrakutas, the title was first used by Dantidurga, an 8th-century ruler of the Deccan and the founder of the Rashtrakuta dynasty. Prithvi means "the earth" and vallabha means either "head of household" or "lover", thus the title can be loosely translated as "Lord of the Earth". The title was associated with Jainism, as it is frequently found in inscriptions of Jain kings and donors across Deccan. Some records even equate Dantidurga and his heirs with exalted religious ideals. The title was often abbreviated to Vallabha, and is also found in contemporary Jain texts. and also The title was abbreviated to vallabha and was written by Muslim observers as Balhara.

== Later dynasties ==
The title was also adopted by the Chalukyas of Kalyani, who succeeded the Rashtrakutas in Deccan. The title was also used by Munja alias Vakpati of Paramara dynasty, which succeeded the Rashtrakutas in Malwa.

== See also ==
- Hammira, Sanskrit transliteration of Arabic emir
- Suratrana, Sanskrit transliteration of Arabic sultan
