= Military history of India =

There were a number of predecessors to the contemporary Army of India: the sepoy regiments, native cavalry, irregular horse and Indian sapper and miner companies raised by the three British presidencies. The Army of India was raised under the British Raj in the 19th century by taking the erstwhile presidency armies, merging them, and bringing them under the Crown. The British Indian Army fought in both World Wars.

The armed forces succeeded the military of British India following India's independence in 1947. After World War II, many of the wartime troops were discharged and units disbanded. The reduced armed forces were partitioned between India and Pakistan. The Indian Armed Forces fought in all four wars against Pakistan, and two wars against People's Republic of China in 1962 and 1967. India also fought in the Kargil War with Pakistan in 1999, the highest altitude mountain warfare in history.

The Indian Armed Forces have participated in several United Nations peacekeeping operations, and are presently the second largest contributor of troops to the peacekeeping force.

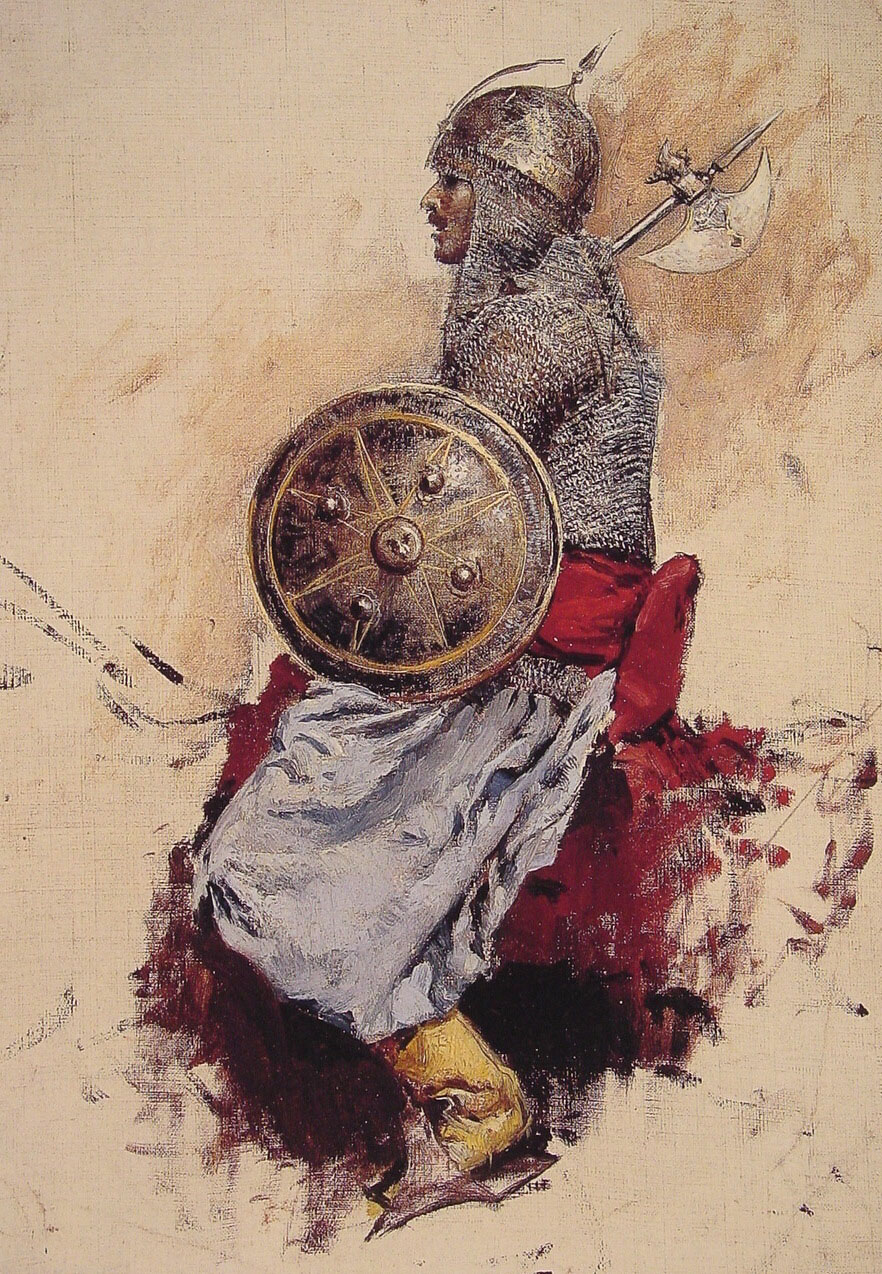
Indian warrior in Armor by Edwin Lord Weeks.

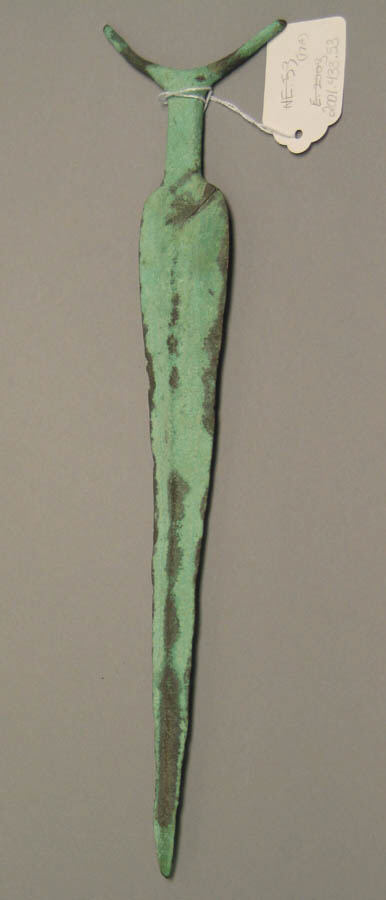
Ancient Indian Antennae sword; Metalwork, 1500–500 BCE.

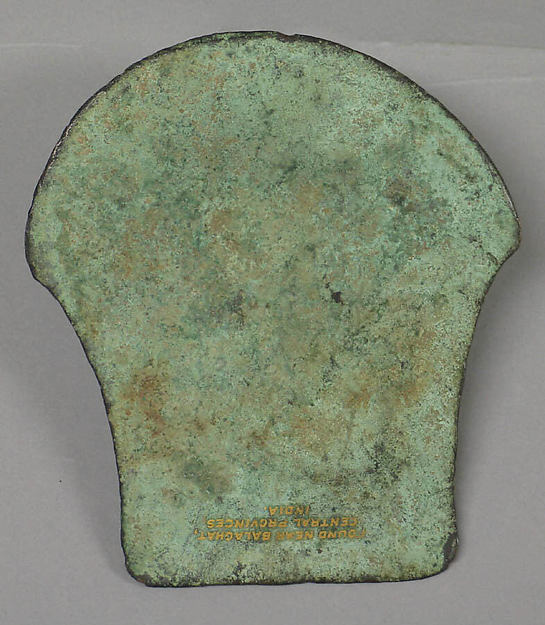
Ancient Indian Ax Blade, 1500–1000 BCE.

== Indus Valley Civilisation ==
Fortified cities have been excavated from the Indus Valley Civilisation with thick and tall walls. Banawali is among the earliest sites in the world where moats have been discovered. These forts also feature square and round bastion and contain a citadel constructed at an elevated height. Sites such as Mohenjo Daro and Dholavira exhibit some outstanding examples of Bronze Age Indian fortifications with their thick tall walls, with the walls made of burned bricks at some places solid mud-brick embankment have been discovered which run for twenty five feet (7.5 meters) without reaching the bottom. Sites such as Desalpar, Dholavira's have yielded massive stone fortifications and the acropolis is extensively fortified with tall standing walls and furnished with ramparts and gateways.

An Indus seal depicting a soldier firing a composite bow was unearthed in Shortugai, Afghanistan, which indicates that Indus people were already familiar with it long before they were depicted in ancient Indian reliefs. Another copper seal from Mohenjo Daro shows a horned hunter holding a composite bow.

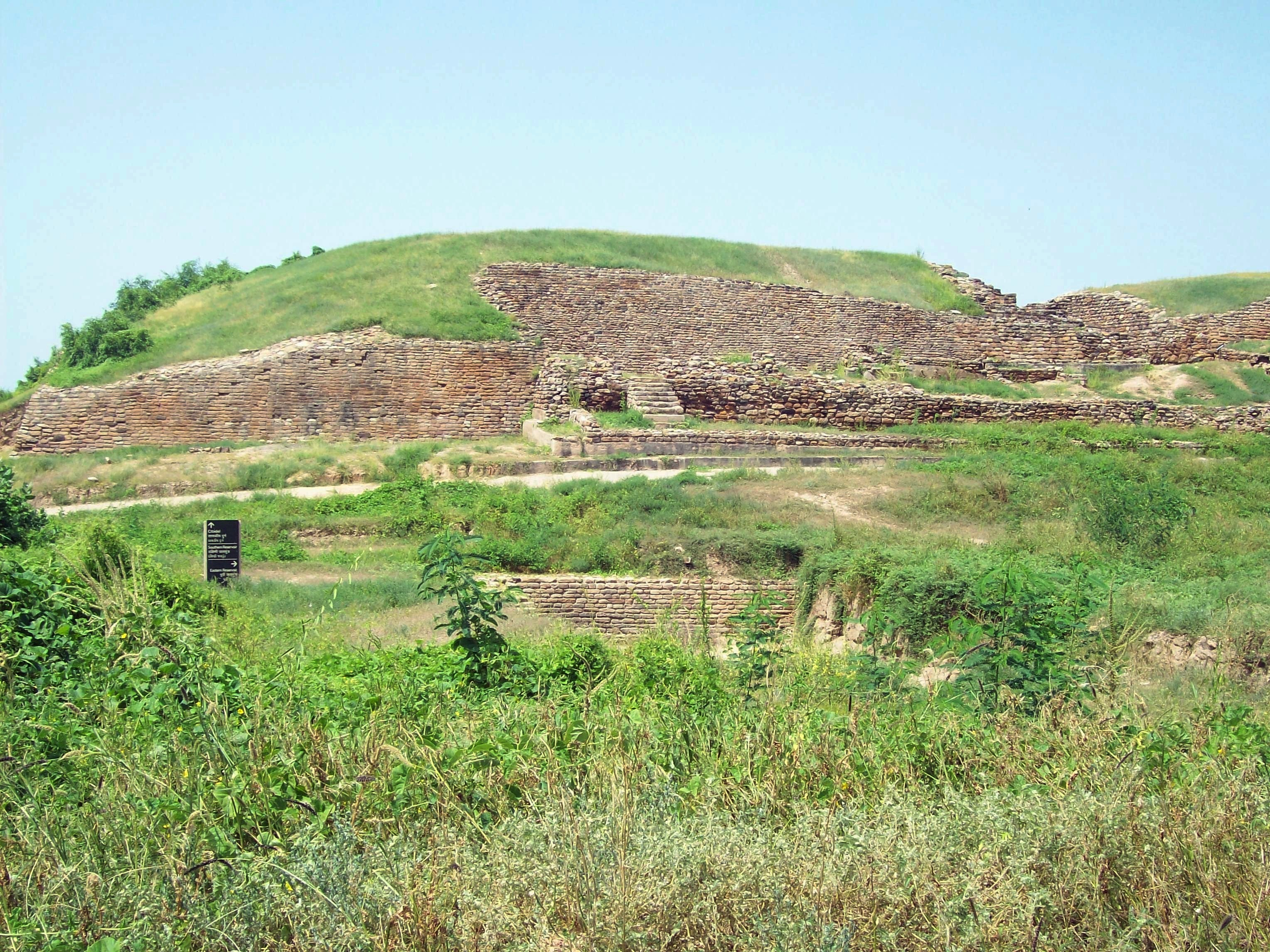
Defensive wall of Dholavira, Gujarat, India, 2650 BCE.

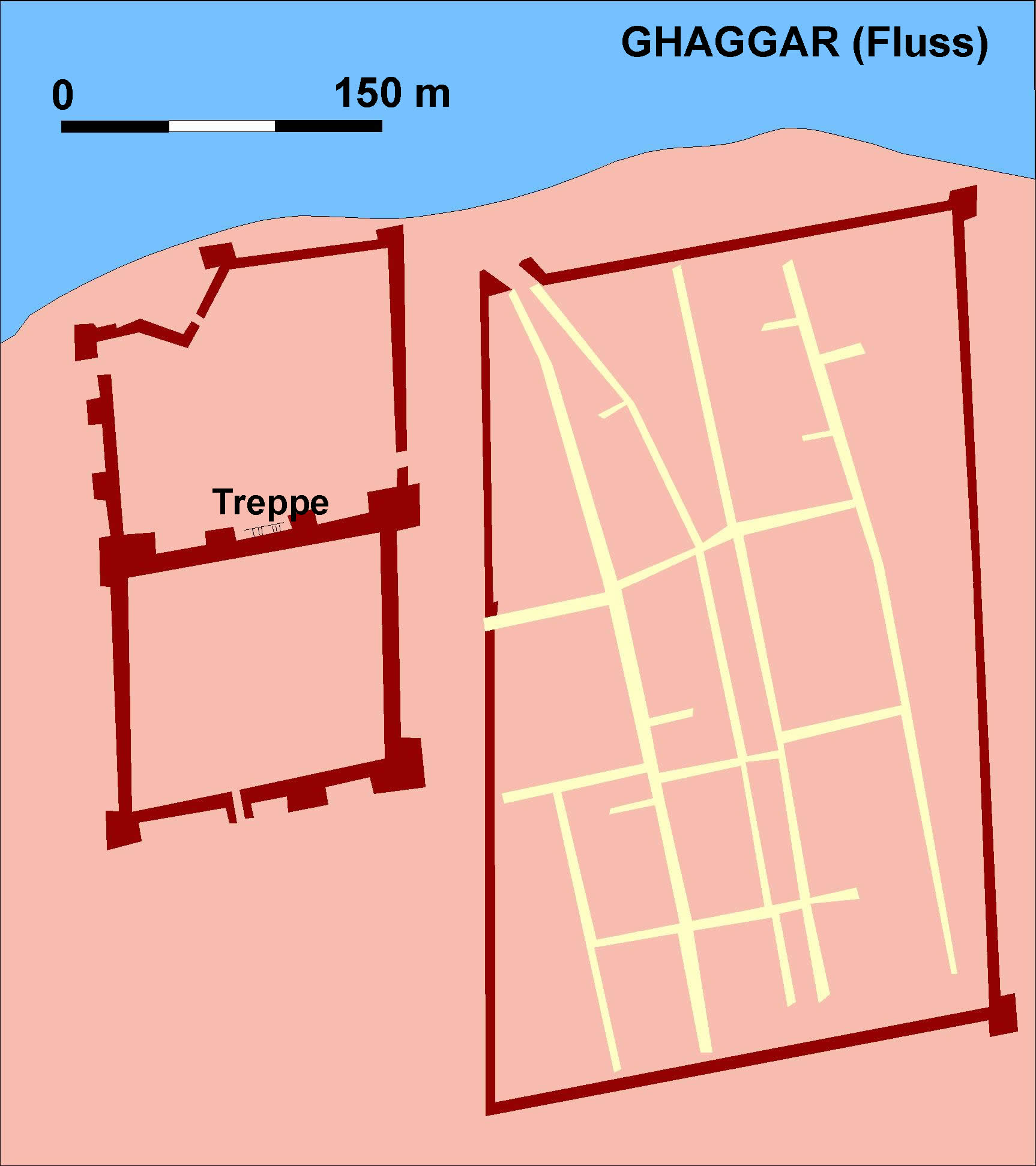
Kalibangan Fortification wall and square bastions, Rajasthan, India, 2500 BCE.

== The Vedic and Mahajanapada period ==
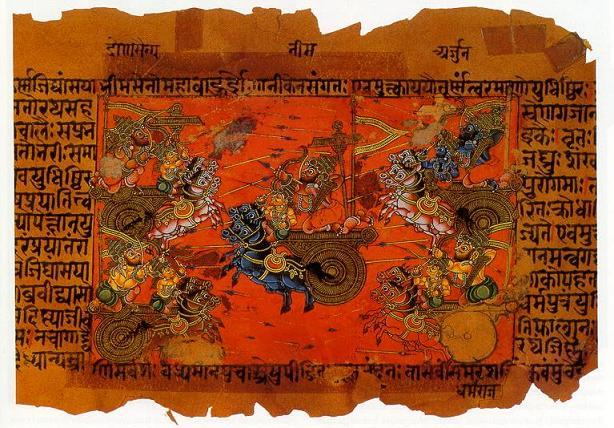
A Manuscript illustration of the Battle of Kurukshetra

An excavation at Sinauli's necropolis has yielded copper swords, helmets and chariots, dating from 2000 to 1800 BC, which suggests the presence of a warrior Indo-Aryan people who followed Vedic religion in the region during the Copper-Bronze Age (2000 BC–1200 BC).

The Rigvedic tribes of Indo-Aryans were led by their kings (raja) and engaged in wars with each other and other tribes. They used bronze weapons and horse (ashva) -drawn spoke-wheeled chariots (ratha) described prominently in the Rigveda. The main share from the booty obtained during cattle raids and battles went to the chief of the tribe. The warriors belonged to the Kshatriya varna. The earliest of such battles is noted in Rigveda as the Battle of the Ten Kings.

The Vedas and other associated texts dating to the post-Rigvedic (Iron Age) Vedic period (ca. 1100–500 BC) contain the earliest written references to armies in India. The earliest known application of war elephants dates to this period; the animals are mentioned in several Vedic Sanskrit hymns.

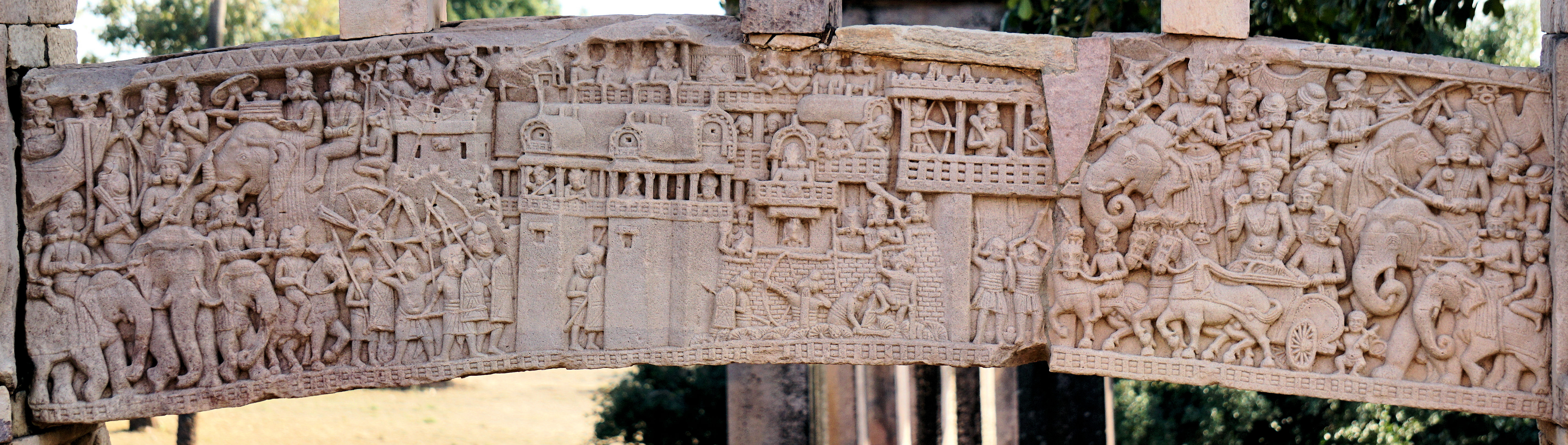
Siege of Kushinagar the capital of the Mallakas by seven states’ chiefs and their armies for the possession of relics of Buddha after his death in the 4th century BCE. Depiction of the battle on Sanchi stupa railing, 1st century BCE.

Map of the Mahajanapadas

The two great epics of Hinduism, the Ramayana and the Mahabharata, center on conflicts between the emerging Mahajanapadas and refer to military formations, theories of warfare and esoteric weaponry. They discuss standing armies that used in war chariots, war elephants and even mythical flying machines (vimana). The Ramayana describes in great detail the fortifications of Ayodhya. The Mahabharata describes various military techniques such as Chakravyuha used in the Kurukshetra War.

== The Indian dynasties ==
Early Military history of India

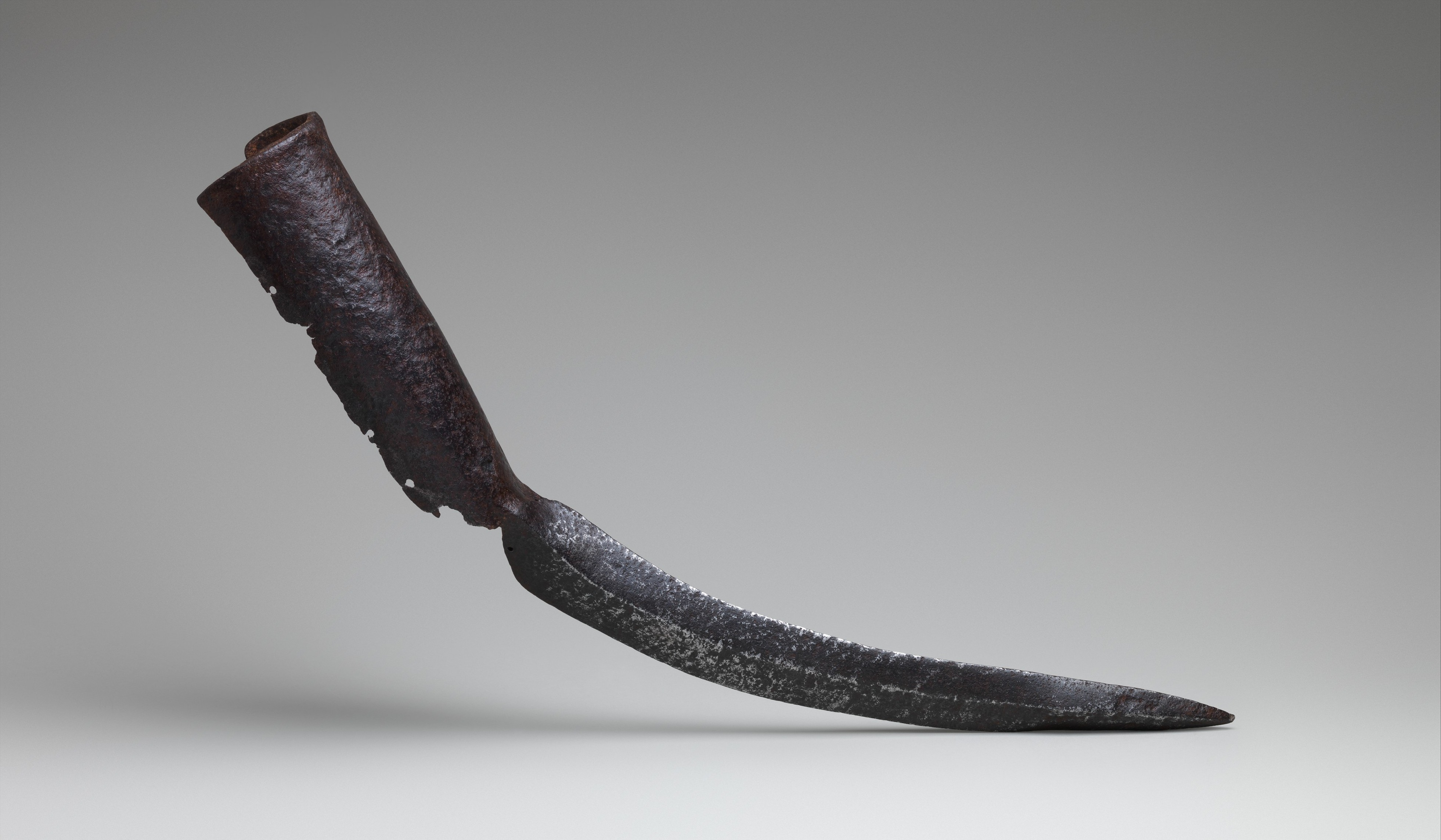
Elephant sword, also called tusk swords, which are pairs of blades specially designed to be attached to elephant tusks.

=== Shaishunaga dynasty ===
The expansionist Emperor Bimbisara conquered Anga in what is now West Bengal and strengthened the military of Magadha's capital, Rajagriha. Ajatashatru built a new fort at Pataliputra, Magadha's new capital, to launch an attack on Licchavis across the Ganges River. Jain texts tell that he used two new weapons; catapults and a covered chariot with swinging mace that has been compared to modern tanks.

=== Nanda dynasty ===
The Nanda dynasty originated from the region of Magadha in ancient India during the 4th century BC. At its greatest extent, the empire ruled by the Nanda dynasty extended from Bengal in the east, to Punjab in the west and as far south as the Vindhya Range.

In 327 BC Alexander the Great began his foray into Punjab. King Ambhi, ruler of Taxila, surrendered the city to Alexander. Alexander fought an epic battle against the Indian king Porus in the Battle of Hydaspes (326). Despite winning, Alexander decided to turn back and end his campaign due to pressure from his generals and troops who were tired and fatigued because of constant battle.

=== Maurya Empire ===
According to Megasthenes, who served as an ambassador from the Seleucid Empire, Chandragupta Maurya built an army consisting of 30,000 cavalry, 9,000 war elephants, and 600,000 infantry. Chandragupta conquered much of the Indian subcontinent, establishing an empire from the Arabian Sea to the Bay of Bengal. He then defeated the Hellenistic Seleucid Empire under Seleucus I Nicator to conquer the regions to the west of the Indus River. He then turned south, taking over much of what is now Central India. His military was administered by six chairs, one for each of the four arms of the army (infantry, cavalry, elephants, and chariots), one chair for the navy, and one for logistics and supply.

Infantry at this time was most commonly armed with a longbow made of bamboo and a single- or double-handed broadsword probably similar to the khanda. Other foot soldiers could be armed with a large animal hide tower shield and a spear or javelins. Cavalry carried lances. Elephants were mounted, sometimes allegedly with howdahs, which may be an Indian invention by archers or javelin throwers, with a mahout around the animal's neck. Chariots by this time were in definite decline, but remained in the army due to their prestige.

In 185 BCE, the last Mauryan emperor was assassinated by Pushyamitra Shunga, the General of the Mauryan Armed Forces.

=== Shunga Empire ===
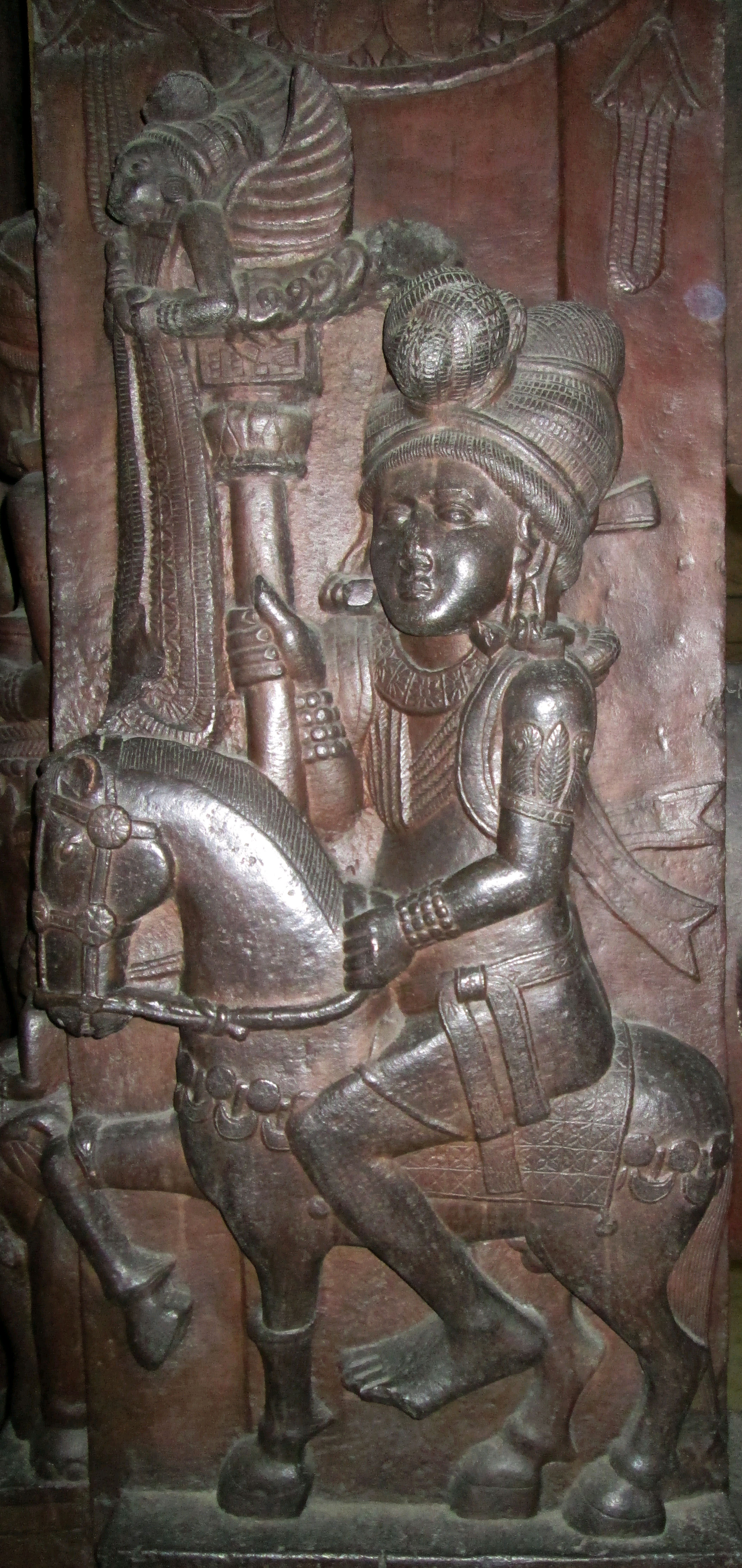
Shunga horseman, Bharhut.

War and conflict characterized the Shunga period. They are known to have warred with the Kalingas, Satavahanas, the Indo-Greeks, and possibly the Panchalas and Mathuras.

Extent of the Shunga Empire's wars with the Indo-Greek Kingdom figure greatly in the history of this period. From around 180 BCE the Indo-Greek ruler Demetrius I of Bactria conquered the Kabul Valley and is theorized to have advanced into the trans-Indus. The Indo-Greek Menander I is credited with either joining or leading a campaign to Pataliputra with other Indian rulers; however, very little is known about the exact nature and success of the campaign. The net result of these wars remains uncertain.

Pushyamitra is recorded to have performed two Ashvamedha Yagnas and Shunga imperial inscriptions have extended as far as Jalandhar. Scriptures such as the Divyavadhana note that his rule extended even farther to Sialkot, in the Punjab. Moreover, if it was lost, Mathura was regained by the Shungas around 100 BCE (or by other indigenous rulers: the Arjunayanas (area of Mathura) and Yaudheyas mention military victories on their coins ("Victory of the Arjunayanas", "Victory of the Yaudheyas"), and during the 1st century BCE, the Trigartas, Audumbaras and finally the Kunindas also started to mint their own coins). Accounts of battles between the Greeks and the Shunga in Northwestern India are also found in the Mālavikāgnimitram, a play by Kālidāsa which describes a battle between Greek cavalrymen and Vasumitra, the grandson of Pushyamitra, on the Indus river, in which the Indians defeated the Greeks and Pushyamitra successfully completed the Ashvamedha Yagna.

The Indo-Greeks and the Shungas seem to have reconciled and exchanged diplomatic missions around 110 BCE, as indicated by the Heliodorus pillar, which records the dispatch of a Greek ambassador named Heliodorus, from the court of the Indo-Greek king Antialcidas, to the court of the Shunga emperor Bhagabhadra at the site of Vidisha in central India.

== The Golden age ==
Classical Indian texts on archery in particular and martial arts in general are known as Dhanurveda. Several classics of the genre date from this period.

=== Satavahana dynasty ===
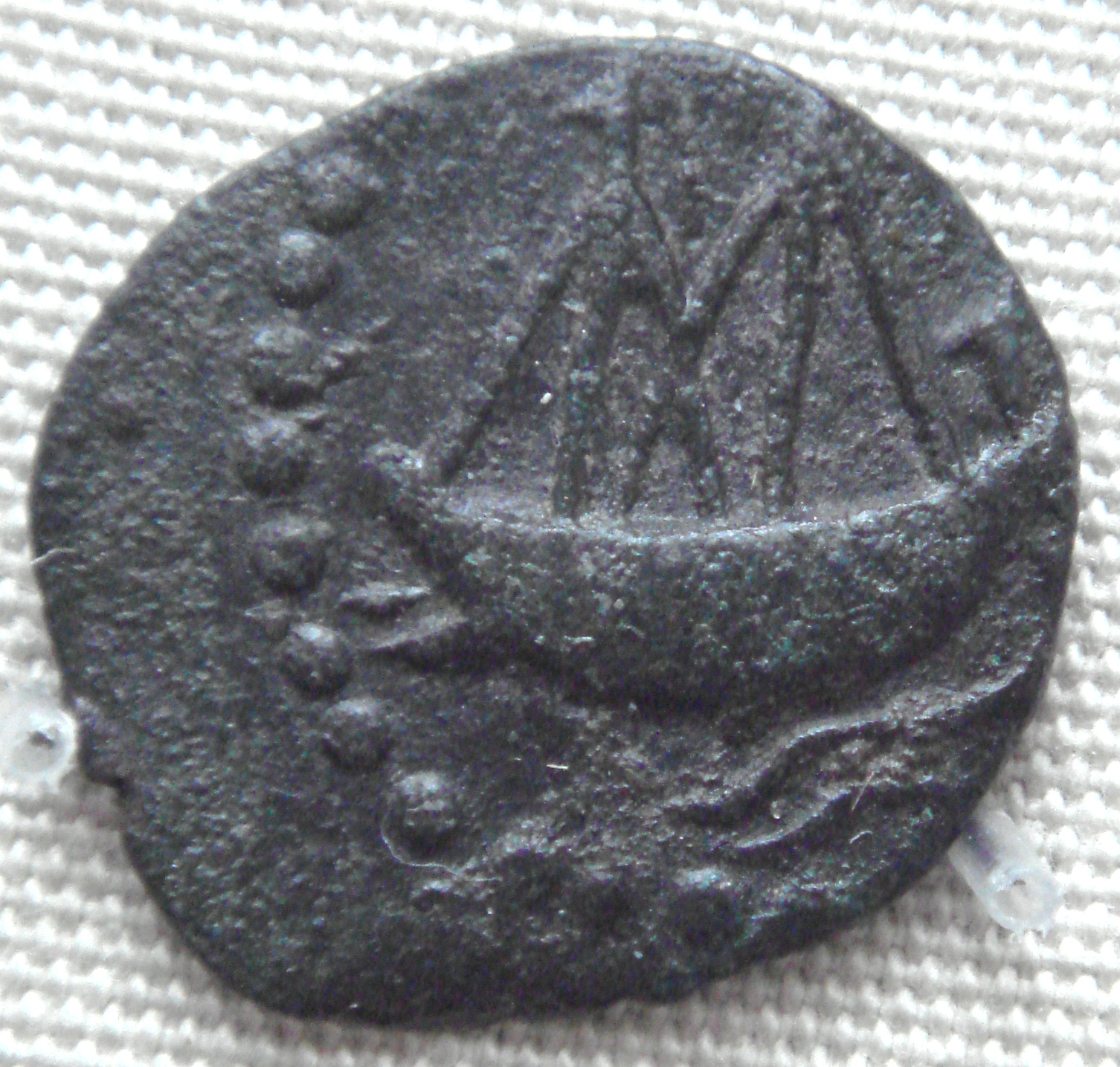
Indian ship on lead coin of Vasisthiputra Sri Pulamavi, testimony to the seafaring and naval capabilities of the Satavahanas during the 1st–2nd century CE.

According to some interpretations of the Puranas, the Satavahana family belonged to the Andhra-jati ("tribe") and was the first Deccanese dynasty to build an empire in daksinapatha (southern region). The Satavahanas (also called Andhra and Shalivahan) rose to power in modern Telangana, Andhra Pradesh and Maharashtra around 200 BCE and remained in power for about 400 years. Almost the whole of present-day Telangana, Maharashtra, Madhya Pradesh, Chhattisgarh, Odisha, Goa, Karnataka, and Andhra Pradesh came under Satavahana rule. Their first capital was Koti Lingala, as well as Paithan, then called Pratishthan.

Simuka, the dynasty's founder, conquered Maharashtra, Malwa and part of Madhya Pradesh. His successor and brother Kanha (or Krishna) further extended his kingdom to the west and the south. He was succeeded by Satakarni I, who defeated the Shunga dynasty of North India. His successor, Gautamiputra Satakarni, defeated the invading Indo-Scythians, Indo-Parthians and Indo-Greeks. His empire extended up to Banavasi in the south, and included Maharashtra, Konkan, Saurashtra, Malwa, west Rajasthan and Vidharbha. Later, Satavahana rulers lost some of these territories. Satavahana power revived briefly under Yajna Sri Satakarni but declined after his death.

=== Mahameghavahana dynasty ===
The Mahameghavahana dynasty was an ancient ruling dynasty of Kalinga after the decline of the Mauryan Empire. The third ruler of the dynasty, Khārabēḷa, conquered much of India in a series of campaigns at the beginning of the common era. Kaḷingan military might was reinstated by Khārabēḷa. Under Khārabēḷa's generalship, the Kaḷinga state had a formidable maritime reach with trade routes linking it to the then-Simhala (Sri Lanka), Burma (Myanmar), Siam (Thailand), Vietnam, Kamboja (Cambodia), Borneo, Bali, Samudra (Sumatra) and Yawadvipa (Java).

Khārabēḷa led a number of successful campaigns against states of Magadha, Anga, Satavahanas and the South Indian regions of Pandyan Empire and expanded Kaḷinga as far as the Ganges and the Kaveri. Colonists from Kalinga settled in Sri Lanka, Burma, as well as the Maldives and Maritime Southeast Asia. Even today Indians are referred to as Keling in Malaysia because of this.

The main source of information about Khārabeḷa is his famous seventeen line rock-cut Hātigumphā inscription in a cave in the Udayagiri hills near Bhubaneswar, Odisha. According to the inscription, he attacked Rajagriha in Magadha, thus defeating the Indo-Greek king Demetrius III Eucaerus retreat to Mathura.

=== Gupta dynasty ===
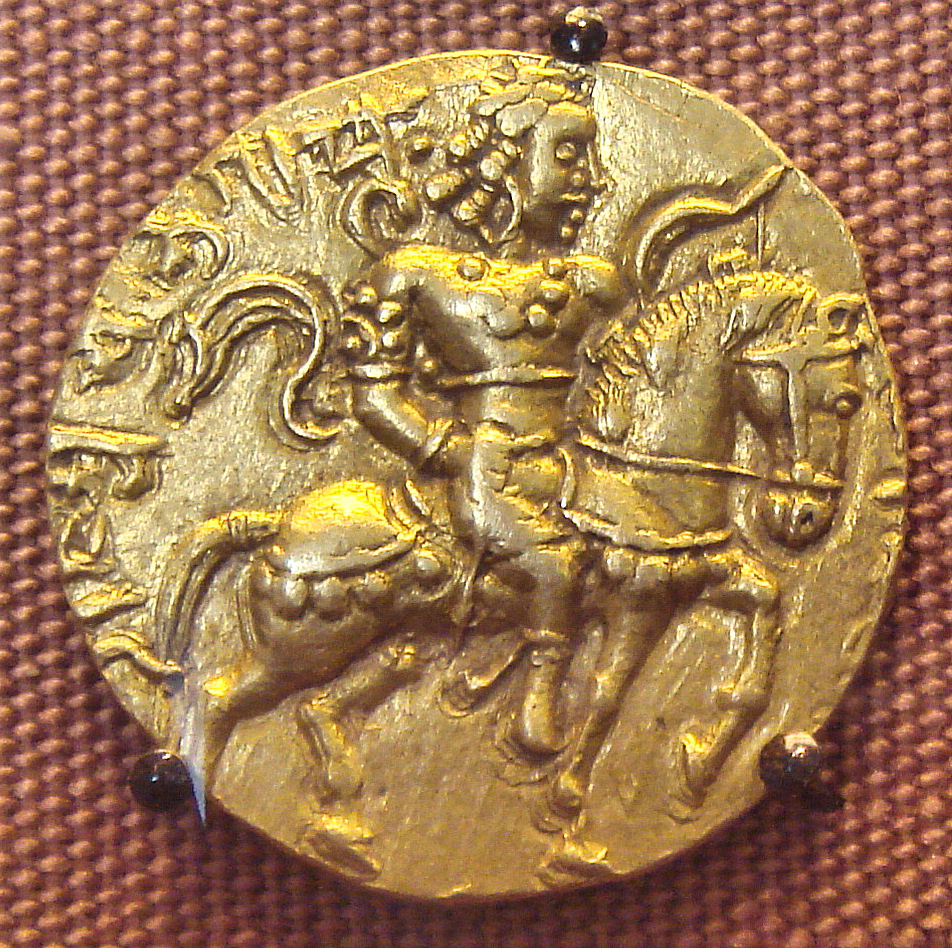
An 8 gm gold coin featuring Chandragupta II astride a caparisoned horse with a bow in his left hand.

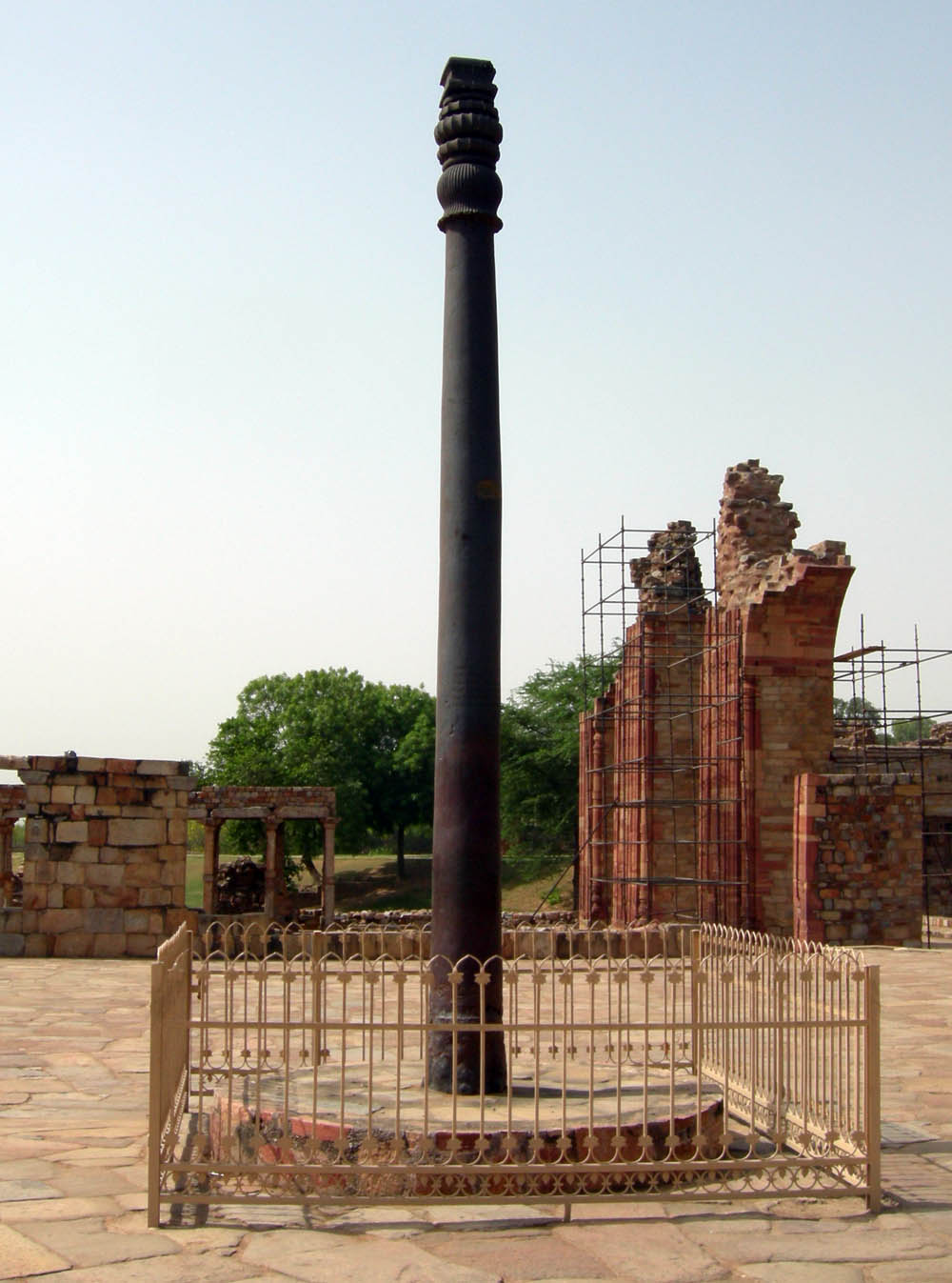
The iron pillar of Delhi, erected by Chandragupta II the Great after he defeated the Vahilakas.

Siva-Dhanur-veda discusses the military of the Gupta Empire. The Guptas relied less on armoured war elephants compared to previous Indian empires. The use of chariots had declined heavily by the time of the Guptas, as they had not proved very useful against the Greeks, Scythians, and other invaders. Guptas used famously used cavalry archers, and it became the prestige arm of the military as evidenced by coinage. Heavy cavalry clad in mail armour and equipped with maces and lances would have used shock action to break the enemy line.

They also employed infantry similar to previous periods: Archers with a longbow composed of bamboo or metal and fired a long bamboo cane arrow with a metal head; iron shafts were used against armoured elephants. They also sometimes used fire arrows. Archers were frequently protected by infantry equipped with shields, javelins, and longswords. The Guptas also maintained a navy, allowing them to control regional waters.

Samudragupta seized the kingdoms of Ahichchhatra and Padmavati early in his reign. Later, he took the Kota kingdom and attacked the tribes in Malvas, the Yaudheyas, the Arjunayanas, the Maduras and the Abhiras. He also subjugated the remnants of the Kushan Empire. By his death in 380, he had conquered over twenty kingdoms.

4th century CE Sanskrit poet Kalidasa, credits Chandragupta II with having conquered about twenty one kingdoms, both in and outside India. After finishing his campaign in the East and West India, he proceeded northwards, subjugated the Parasikas, then the Hunas and the Kambojas tribes located in the west and east Oxus valleys respectively. of the Indian subcontinent; the Gupta empire was the most powerful empire in the world during his reign, at a time when the Roman Empire in the west was in decline.

Skandagupta faced with invading Indo-Hephthalites or White Huns, from the northwest. Skandagupta had warred against the Huns during the reign of his father, and was celebrated throughout the empire as a great warrior. He crushed the Huns invasion in 455, and managed to keep them at bay; however, the expense of the wars drained the empire's resources and contributed to its decline

== The Classical age ==
=== Empire of Harsha ===
Emperor Harsha (606–647) ruled the Empire of Harsha covering northern India for over forty years. His father, a king of Thaneswar, had gained prominence by successful wars against the Huns. Harsha had plans to conquer the whole of India, and carried on wars for thirty years with considerable success. By 612 he had built up a vast army with which he conquered nearly all North India up to the Narmada river. In 620 he invaded the Deccan Plateau but was repelled by Pulakeshin II.

=== The Chalukyas and Pallavas ===
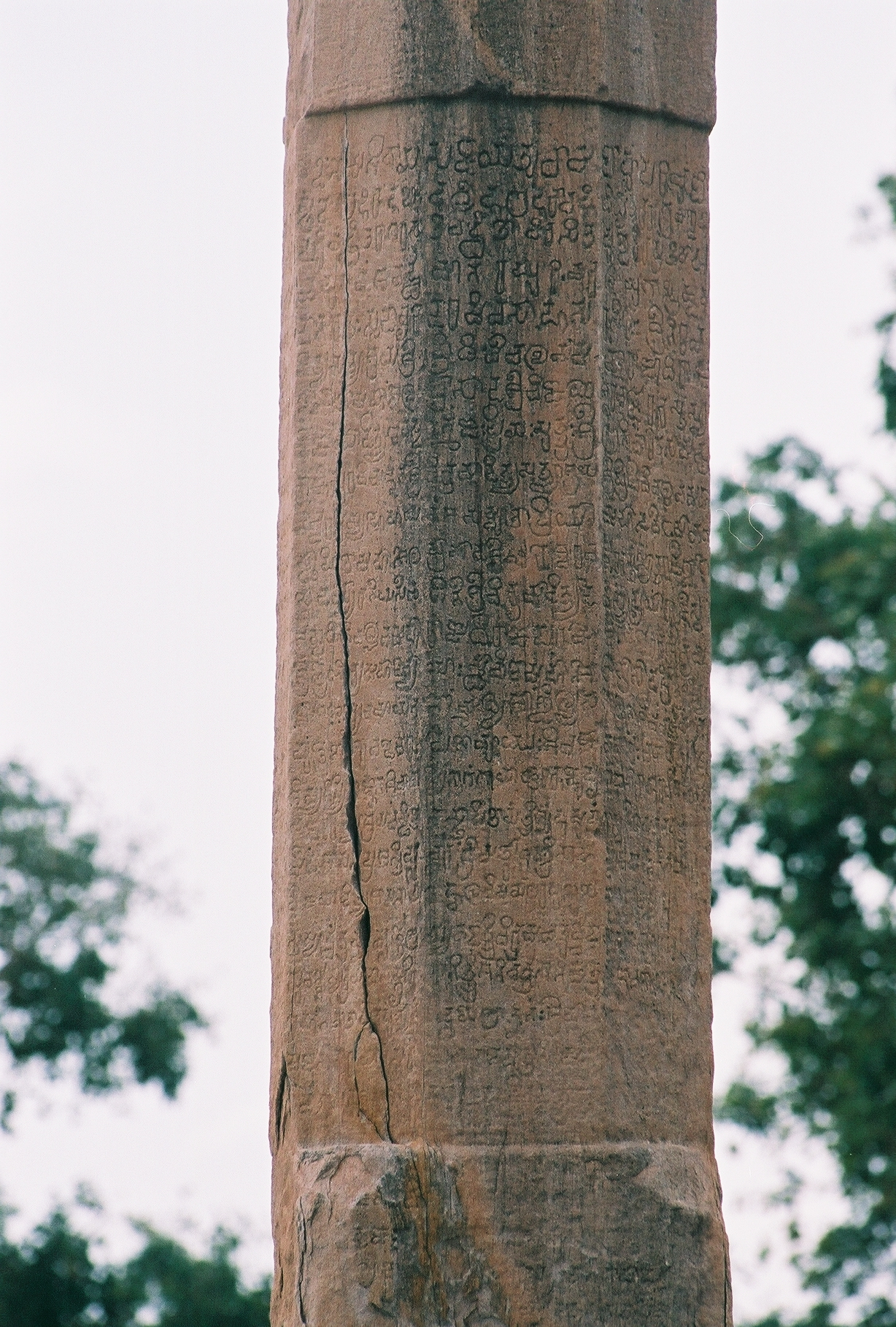
Old Kannada inscription on a Chalukya victory pillar, Virupaksha Temple, Pattadakal, 733–745 CE

In South India, the Chalukyas and the Pallavas gained prominence. The Chalukya ruler Pulakeshin II's expansionism started with minor campaigns against the Alupas, Gangas and others. He defeated the Pallava king Mahendravarman and conquered the Cheras and the Pandyas. His greatest military success, the defeat of Harshavardhana (also known as Harsha), depleted his treasury, forcing him to end his expansionist campaigns.

The Pallava king Narasimhavarman vowed to avenge Mahendravarman's defeat by Pulakeshin II. He invaded Vatapi with an army headed by his general Paranjothi. He defeated the Chalukyas, killing Pulakeshin II in 642. Clashes between the Chalukyas and the Pallavas continued for a century, until the Chalukya king Vikramaditya II won a decisive victory against the Pallavas in 740. The Rashtrakutas overthrew the Chalukya empire in 750. During the 970s, Tailapa II overthrew the Rashtrakutas and recovered most of the Chalukya Empire, except for Gujarat. The Chalukyas of this period are known as the Kalyani Chalukyas, as Kalyani was their capital. They clashed intermittently with the Cholas.

=== The Chola Empire ===
The Cholas were the first rulers of the Indian subcontinent to maintain a navy and use it to expand their dominion overseas. Vijayalaya Chola defeated the Pallavas and captured Thanjavur. In the early 10th century the Chola king Parantaka I defeated the Pandyan king Maravarman Rajasimha II and invaded Sri Lanka. The Rashtrakuta ruler Krishna III defeated and killed Parantaka I's son Rajaditya in about 949.

Uttama Chola reigned 970–85. Inscriptions tell that at least from his time, Chola warriors wore waist coats of armour. Hence, one regiment was called Niyayam-Uttama-Chola-tterinda-andalakattalar. Paluvettaraiyar Maravan Kandanar served as a general under Uttama and his predecessor, Sundara.

Rajaraja Chola began his military career with the conquest of the Cheras in the Kandalur War. He captured the Pandya ruler Amara Bhujanga, the town of Vizhinjam, and a part of Sri Lanka. In the 14th year of his reign (998–999) he conquered the Gangas of Mysore, the Nolambas of Bellary and Eastern Mysore, Tadigaipadi, Vengi, Coorg, the Pandyas and the Chalukyas of the Deccan. During the next three years, he subdued Quilon and the northern kingdom of Kalinga with the help of his son Rajendra Chola I. Rajendra later completed the conquest of Sri Lanka, crossed the Ganges, and marched across Kalinga to Bengal. He sent out a great naval expedition that occupied parts of Java, Malaya, and Sumatra. The Cholas were brought down by the Hoysalas from the west and Pandyas from the south.

=== The Gurjar-Pratiharas, Palas and Rashtrakutas ===
The Arab scholar Sulaiman described the emperor of the Rashtrakuta dynasty as one of the four great kings of the world in the 9th century. In middle of the 9th century, the Palas under Devapala attacked and subjugated the Gurjara-Pratiharas. Led by Mihir Bhoja, the Pratiharas, and their allies defeated Narayan Pala after the death of Devapala.

There were multiple battles between the Gurjar Pratiharas under Bhoj and the Rashtrakutas under Krishna II with mixed results. When the Rashtrakuta king Indra III attacked Kanauj, Mahipala I, Mihir Bhoj's successor, fled; he later returned.

Al-Masudi wrote that in 915, during Mahipala's rule, the Pratiharas were at war with the Muslims in the west and the Rashtrakutas in the south, and that the Gurjar Pratiharas had four armies of about 80,000 men each.

=== Arab conquest of Sindh ===
In 712, an Arab general, named Muhammad bin Qasim Al-Thaqafi (Arabic: محمد بن قاسم) (c. 31 December 695 – 18 July 715), attacked and conquered Sindh kingdom which is mainly situated in Indus valley area (after partition, now in modern-day Pakistan); by the time Sindh was ruled by Raja Dahir of the Rai dynasty, and this dynasty was at war with Arabs. Though they defeated several Arab invasions before 712 CE, this time being deprived of local Buddhist people's support, Sindh was captured and the first step of Islamic foundation in India was created. Chach Nama (Sindhi: چچ نامو), written by Kàzí Ismáíl briefly discusses the events. However, the South Indian emperor Vikramaditya II of the Chalukya dynasty and the Pratiharas defeated the Arabs during the Caliphate campaigns in India (738 CE) when they tried to move eastward.

Indian inscriptions confirm this invasion but record the Arab success only against the smaller states in Gujarat. They also record the defeat of the Arabs at two places. The southern army moving south into Gujarat was defeated at Navsari by the south Indian Emperor Vikramaditya II of the Chalukya dynasty who sent his general Pulakeshin to defeat the Arabs. The army that went east, reached Avanti whose ruler Nagabhata I of Gurjara Pratihara utterly defeated the invaders. Arab forces failed to make any substantial gains in India and in the Caliphate campaigns in India (730 CE), their army was severely defeated by the Indian kings. As a result, Arabs' territory got restricted to Sindh in modern Pakistan.

=== Ghaznavid invasion ===
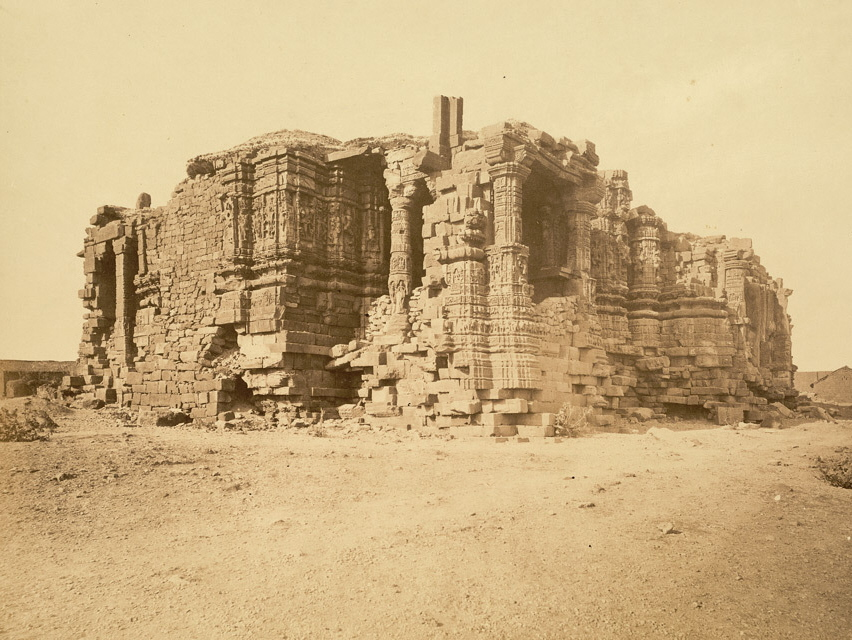
Somnath temple in ruins, 1869 CE.

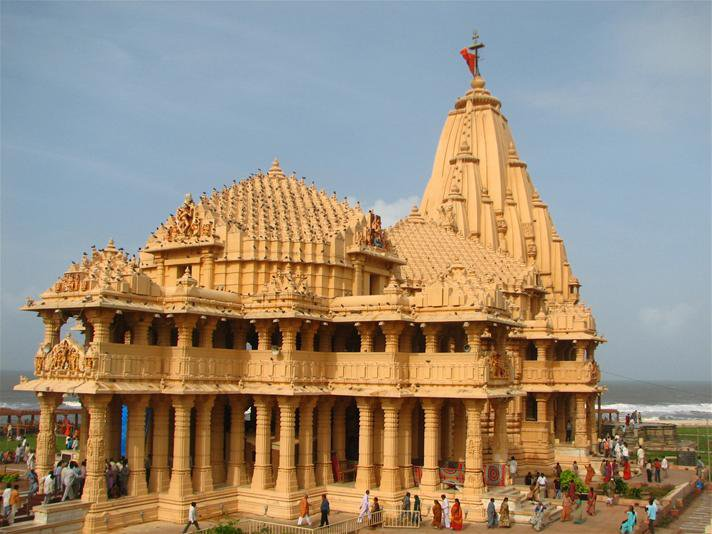
Front view of the present Somnath Temple.

The Somnath temple was first attacked by Muslim Turkic invader Mahmud of Ghazni and repeatedly demolished by successive Muslim invaders, each time being rebuilt by Hindu rulers.

In the early 11th century, Mahmud of Ghazni conquered the Rajput Hindu Shahi kingdom in the North-west frontier in Afghanistan and Pakistan, and his raids into northern India weakened the Pratihara kingdom, which was drastically reduced in size and came under the control of the Chandelas. Mahmud sacked some temples across northern India, including the temple at Somnath in Gujarat, but his permanent conquests were limited to the Punjab. The early 11th century also saw the reign of the polymath king Raja Bhoj, the Paramara ruler of Malwa. Ghaznavids were later repulsed by multiple local Hindu dynasties in which Chauhans under Vigraharaja IV are known to have played a crucial role.

== The Medieval era ==
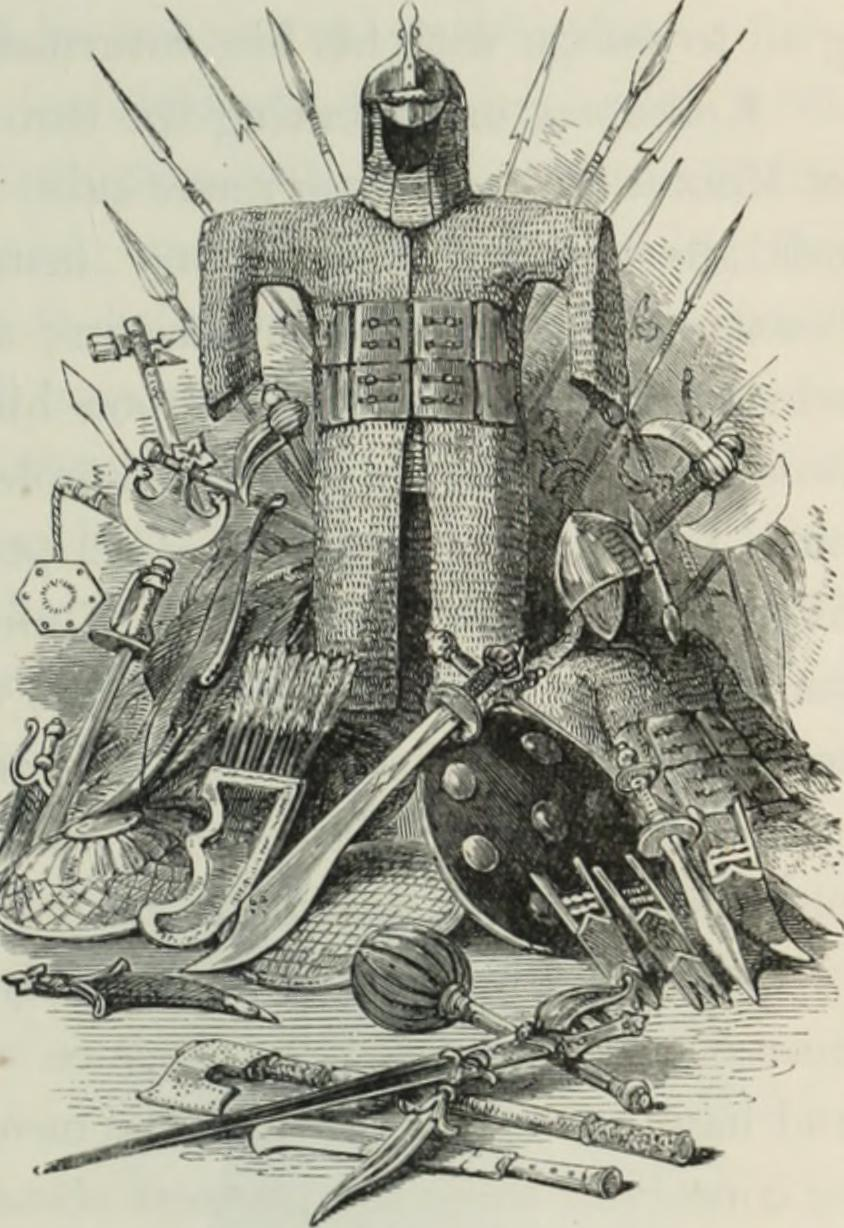
Group of Indian Armoir

=== Delhi Sultanate ===
The Delhi Sultanate, under the Khalji dynasty, repelled several invasions by the Mongol Empire. Zafar Khan, a general serving Alauddin Khalji, defeated the Mongols near Jalandhar in 1297. In 1299, Zafar Khan fought back a Mongol army of 200,000 soldiers but was killed in the process. The Sultanate declined after it faced twofold resistance one from Mewar dynasty under Maharana Hammir and other from Harihara and Bukka who established the Vijayanagara Empire in south. Its last sultan, Ibrahim Lodi, who was presiding over a crumbling empire due to numerous internal rebellions and rise of powerful Mewari Rajput king Rana Sanga, died fighting the forces of Babur in the first battle of Panipat in 1526, ending the sultanate and paving the way for the foundation of the Mughal Empire.

=== The Rajputs ===
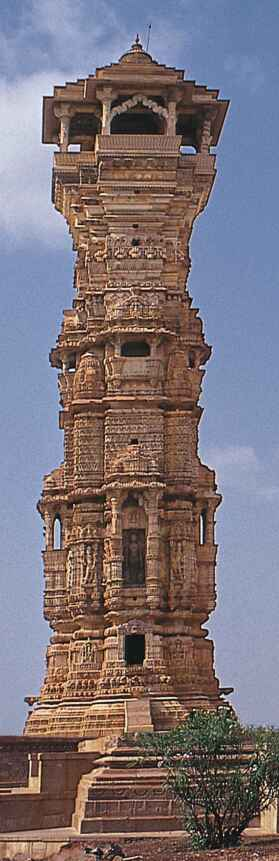
Kirti Stambh

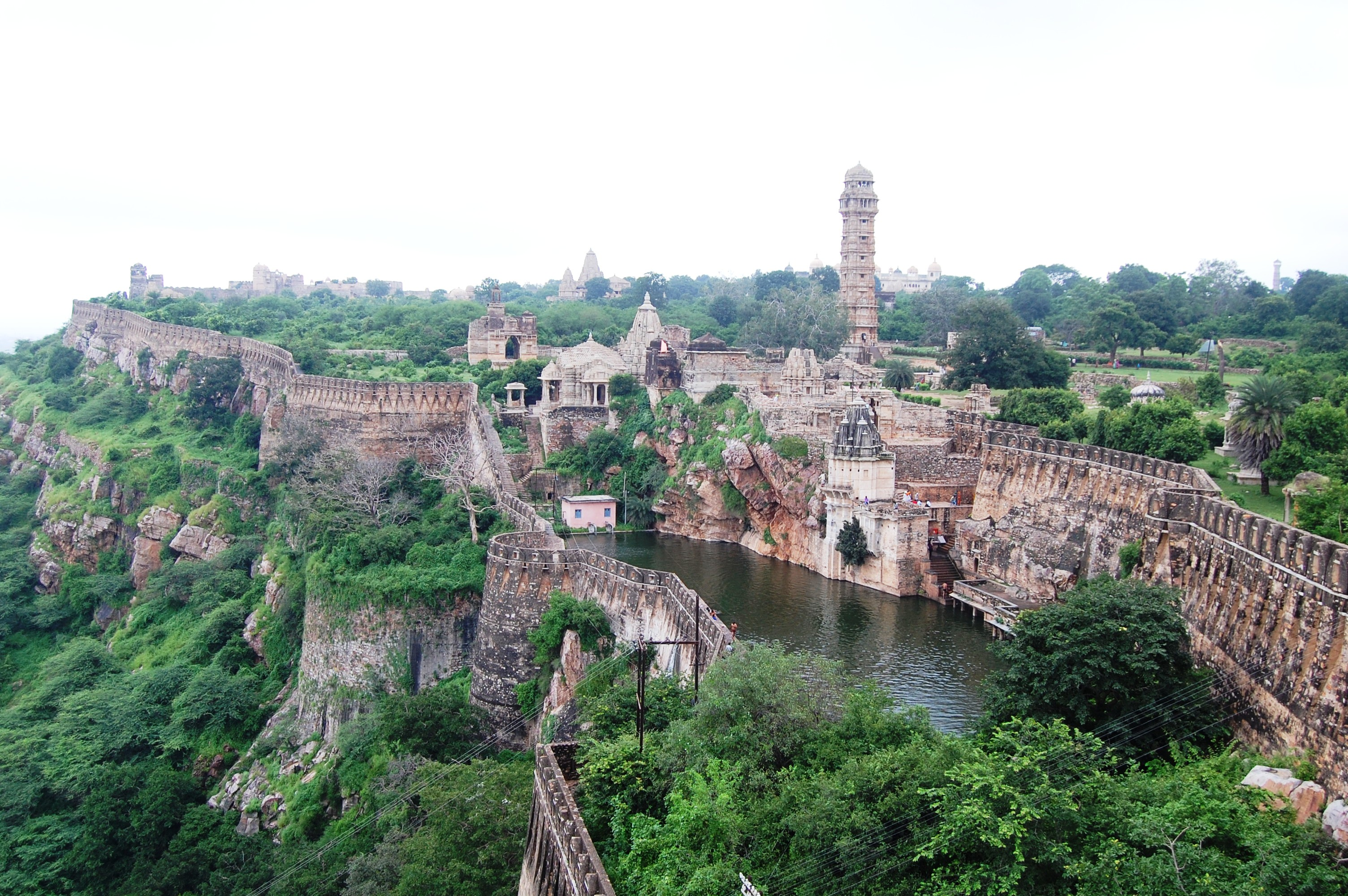
Chittor Fort is the largest fort on the Indian subcontinent; it is one of the six Hill Forts of Rajasthan.

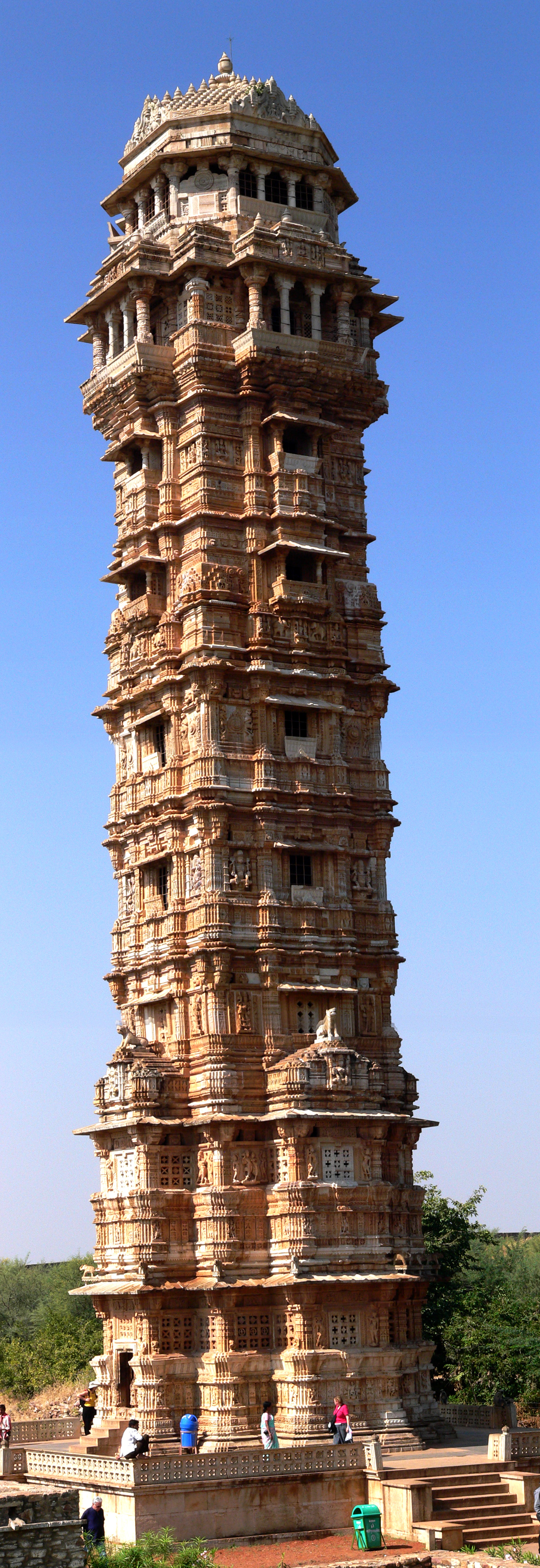
Vijay Stambha

After Babur's victory over Ibrahim Lodi, the Mewar ruler Rana Sanga led a combined Rajput army of 20,000 intending to defeat Babur and capture Delhi. The Rajput army defeated the combined armies of Mughals and Afghans in Battle of Bayana. The Mughals had superior artillery, which prevailed against the Rajput cavalry yet Mughals won only when Tomar general betrayed Rana Sanga, resulting in his defeat by Babur at the Battle of Khanua (16 March 1527). During the reign Rana Sanga's son Rana Udai Singh II, Babur's grandson Akbar conquered Chittor, the capital of Mewar.

In the Battle of Haldighati (21 June 1576) between Akbar and Rana Pratap Singh, the Mughal army of 80,000 was headed by a Rajput, Raja Man Singh, and Akbar's son Salim. The Rajput army's strength was 20,000. Rana Pratap reluctantly retreated with the help of his estranged brother Shakti Singh. His legendary horse Chetak was killed in the battle. Later, Rana Pratap organized a small army of Bhil tribals funded by a Jain businessman called Bhamashah and started a guerrilla war against Akbar and won Battle of Dewair (1582). He retook large parts of Mewar but could not retake Chittor.

=== Muzaffarid dynasty ===
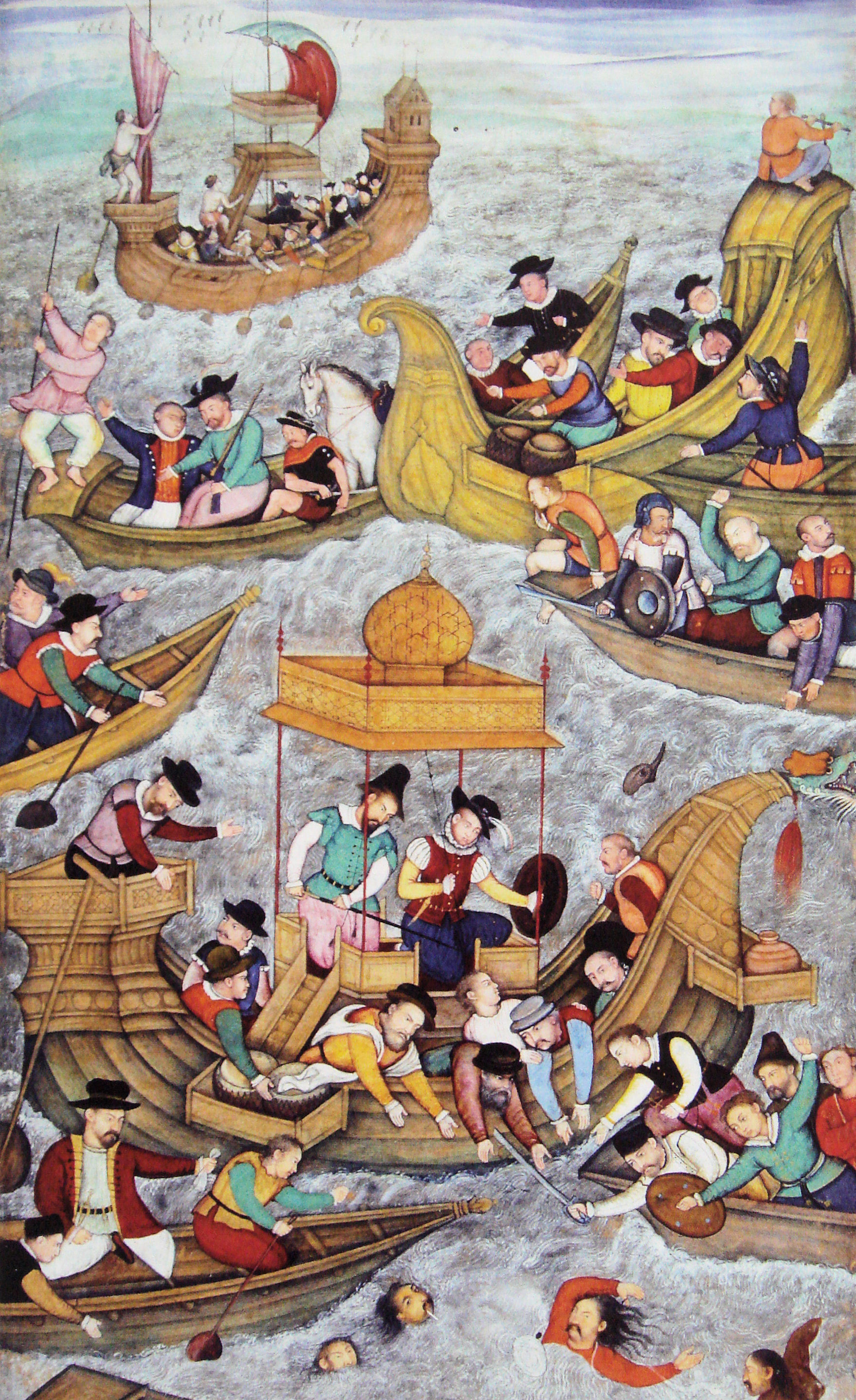
The death of Bahadur Shah of Gujarat at Diu in 1537.

Sultan Muzaffar Shah I, the governor of Gujarat, established the Muzaffarid dynasty in 1391. It expanded rapidly and peaked under Sultan Mahmud I, who lost the Battle of Diu to the Portuguese in 1509. The dynasty power was greatly reduced by invasions from Mewar under Maharana Sanga.

=== Calicut ===
Ruled by the Zamorin, the small Hindu Nair kingdom of Calicut (Malabar) welcomed the Portuguese in 1498 as traders but then fought several naval wars with Portugal in the 16th century. The office of Muslim naval chief in Calicut was known as the Kunjali Marakkar.

=== Vijayanagara Empire ===
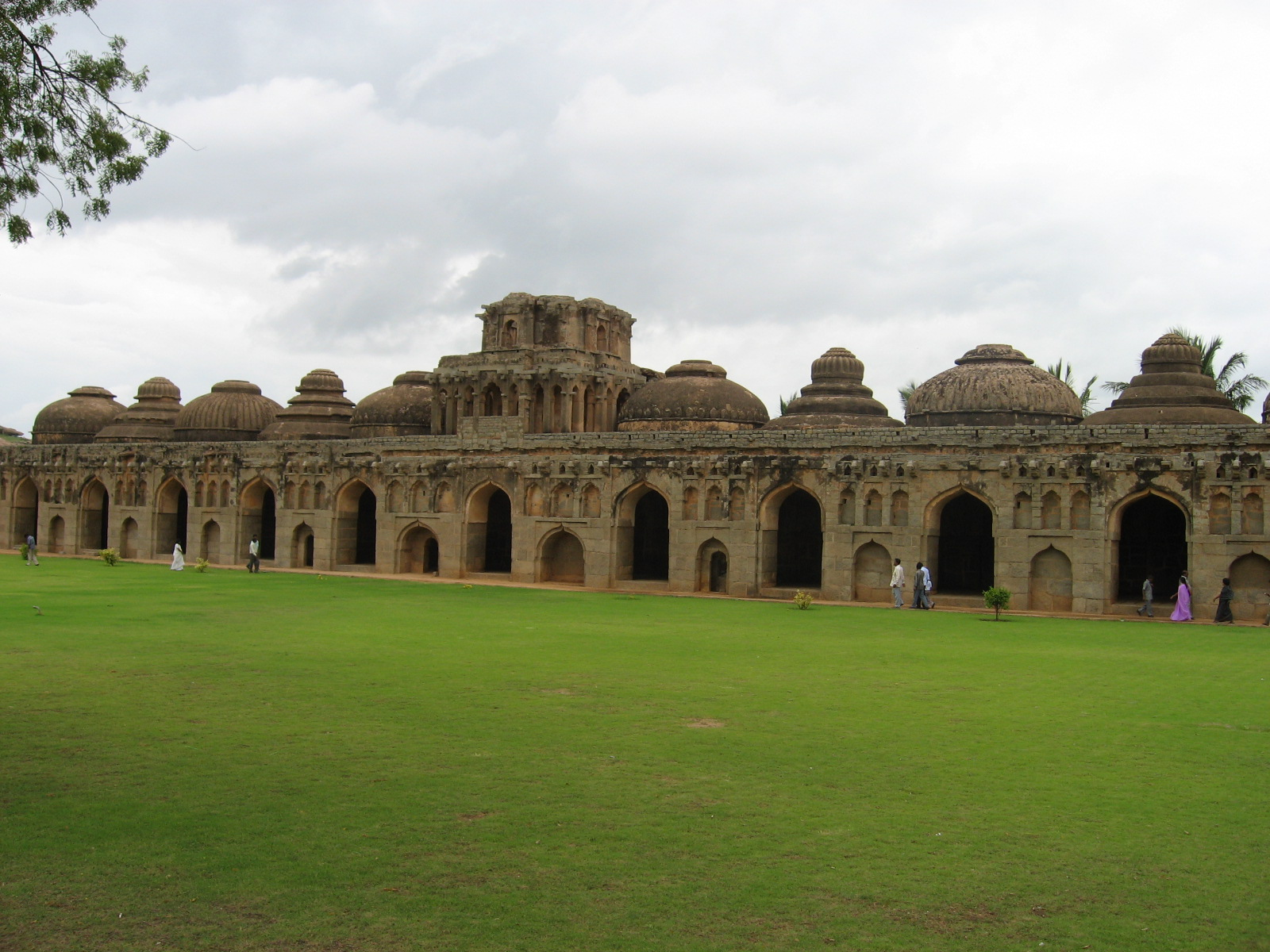
Gajashaala or elephant's stable, built by the Vijayanagar rulers for their war elephants.

The Italian traveler Niccolo de Conti wrote of the Emperor of the Vijayanagara Empire as the most powerful ruler of India in the 15th century. In 1509, the Bahamani Sultan declared war against the Vijayanagara Empire. His large coalition army was defeated by Krishnadevaraya in a battle in which the Sultan was wounded. In 1510, Krishnadevaraya launched a counteroffensive against the Sultan at Kovelaconda; Yusuf Adil Shahi of Bijapur died in the battle. In 1512, Krishnadevaraya captured Raichur and Gulbarga after defeating Barid-i-Mamalik, the titular head of the Bahmani Sultanate, who escaped to Bidar. Later, Bidar also fell to Krishnadevaraya, who restored the Bahmani Sultan to his throne under the terms of their peace treaty.

Between 1512 and 1514, Krishnadevaraya subjugated the Palaigar of Ummattur, who had rebelled against his brother. During this campaign, the Gajapati of Odisha attacked Vijayanagara and occupied two northeast provinces: Udayagiri and Kondavidu. Krishnadevaraya recaptured these lands between 1513 and 1518.

On 26 January 1565, the neighboring kingdoms of Ahmednagar, Berar, Bidar, Bijapur and Golconda Sultanates came together to treacherously defeat the Vijayanagar decisively in the Battle of Talikota. The surviving Vijaynagar forces fled with a large treasury to re-establish their headquarters at Vellore Fort in Tamil Nadu and Chandragiri (Andhra Pradesh) near Tirupathi. It would be here that the British would seek a land grant to establish the English East India Company Fort St. George in Madras.

Later, the Vijayanagara's southern Telugu governors, in present-day Tamil Nadu, became independent. They became the Gingee Nayaks in Gingee Fort, the Tanjore Nayaks, and the Nayaks of Madurai.

=== Ahom Kingdom ===
Ahom kingdom
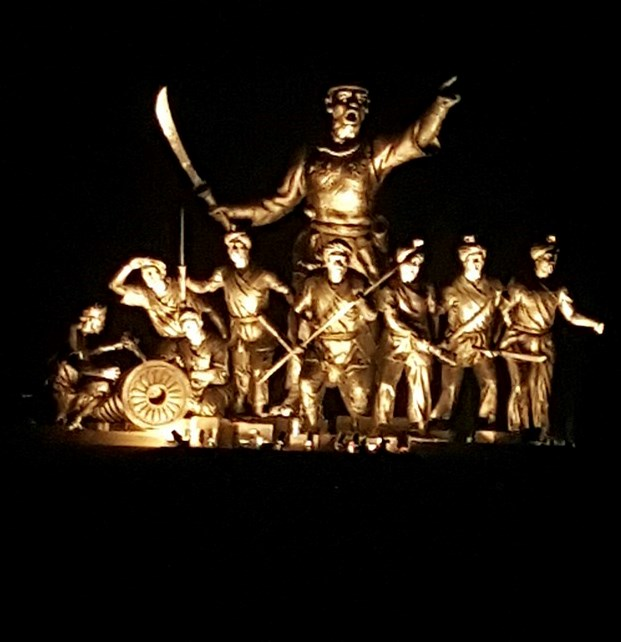
Statue of Ahom general Lachit Borphukan, known for his leadership in the 1671 Battle of Saraighat.

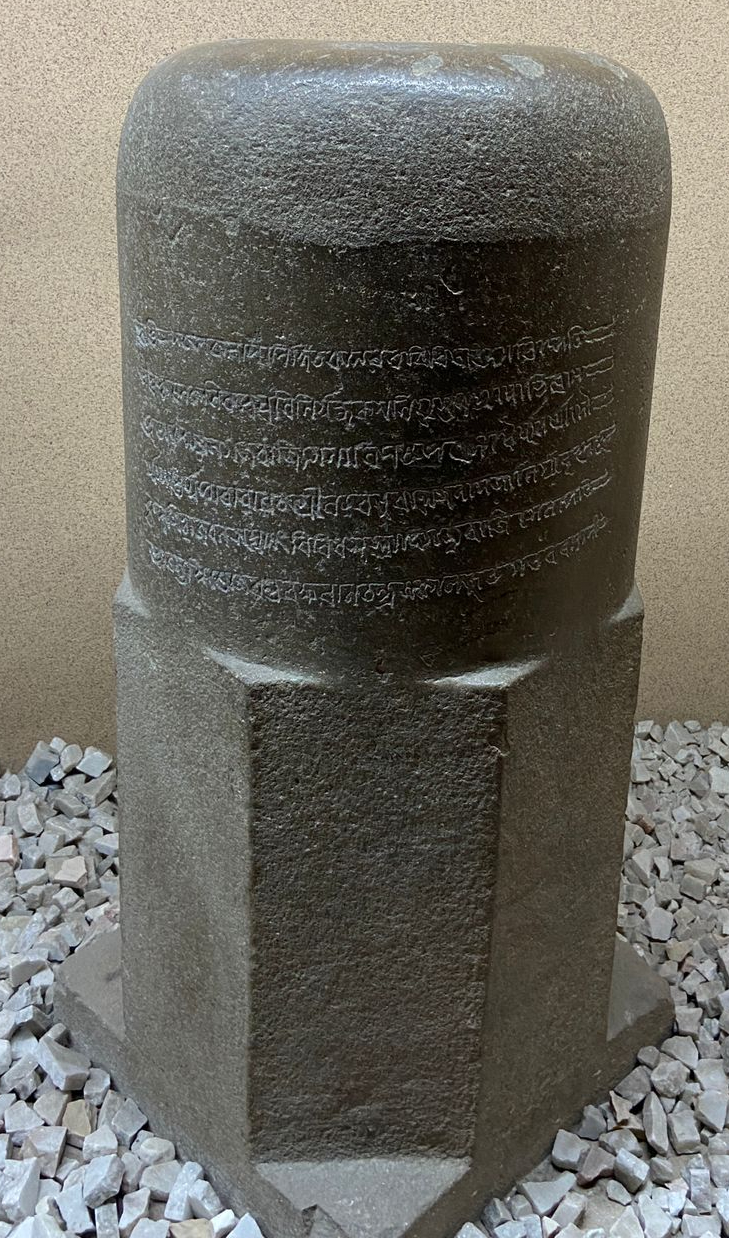
Stone inscription marking the victory of the Ahoms over Mughals

Ahom Kingdom (1228–1826) was a kingdom and tribe which rose to prominence in present-day Assam early in the thirteenth century. They ruled much of Assam from the 13th century until the establishment of British rule in 1838. The Ahoms brought with them a tribal religion and a language of their own, however they later merged with the Hindu religion. From thirteenth until seventeenth century, repeated attempts were made by the Muslim rulers of Delhi to invade and subdue Ahoms, however the Ahoms managed to maintain their independence and ruled themselves for nearly 600 years.

=== Mughal Empire ===
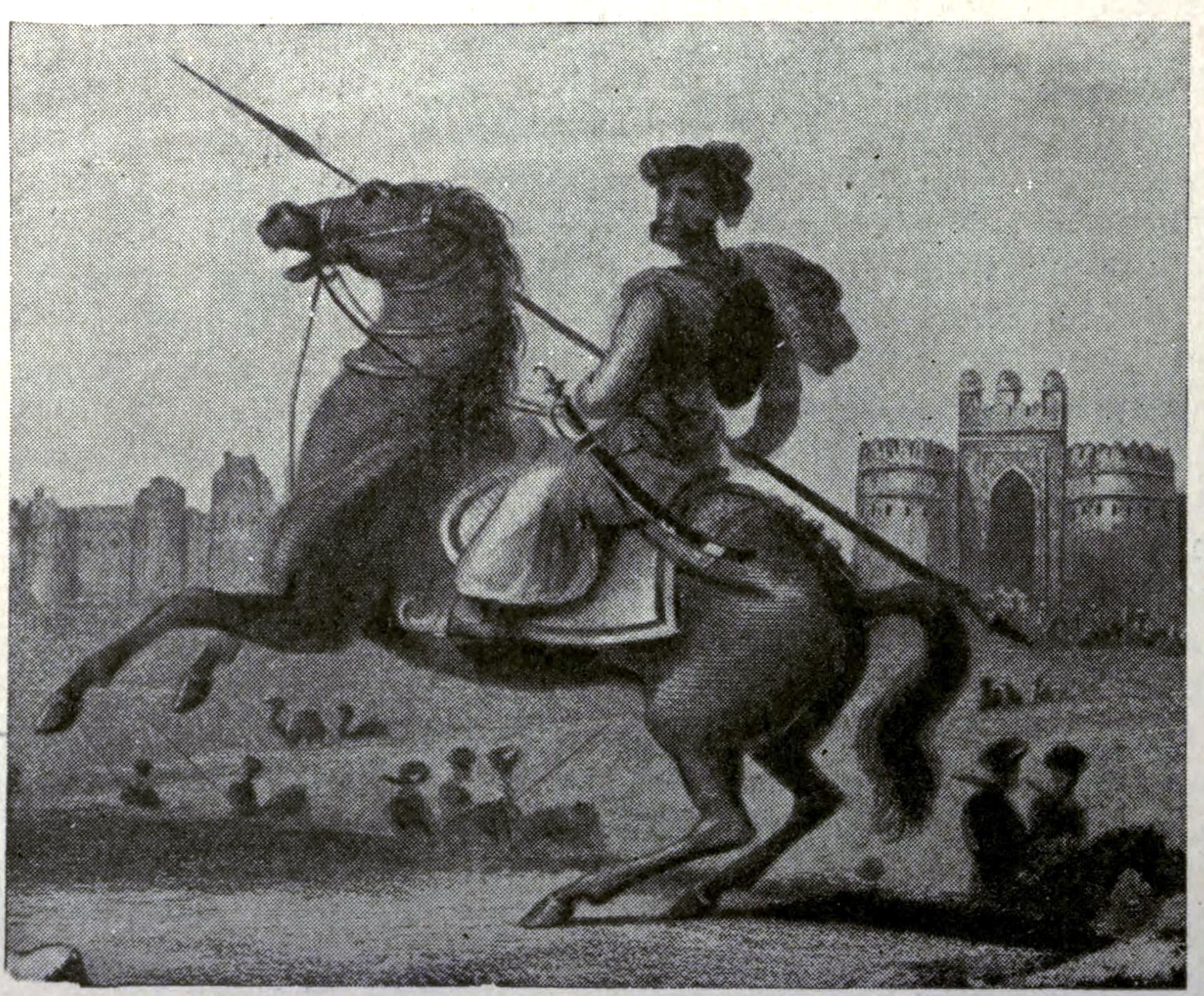
Cavalry soldier of Mughal Empire

The Mughal Empire, one of the states Age of the Islamic Gunpowders began in 1526 with the overthrow of Ibrahim Lodi and encompassed most of South Asia by the late 17th and early 18th centuries. Allied with the local rulers, it extended from Bengal in the east to Kabul in the west, Kashmir in the north to the Kaveri basin in the south, a territory of over 4 million km^{2} (1.5 million sq mi) at its height. Its population at that time has been estimated at between 110 and 130 million. In the year 1540, then Mughal Emperor Humayun was defeated by Sher Shah Suri, and forced to retreat to Kabul. Suris and their adviser, the Hindu emperor Hem Chandra Vikramaditya, also called Hemu, ruled North India from 1540 to 1556. Hemu established a 'Hindu' empire briefly from Delhi in 1556.

The "classic period" of the empire started in 1556 with the accession of Akbar the Great and ended with the death of Emperor Aurangzeb in 1707, although the dynasty continued for another 150 years. During this period, the empire was marked by centralized administration and active culture. Following 1725 the empire declined rapidly, weakened by wars of succession; famine and local revolts fueled by it; the growth of religious intolerance; the rise of the Maratha Empire; and finally British colonialism. The last Mughal emperor, Bahadur Shah II, whose rule was restricted to the city of Delhi, was imprisoned and exiled by the British after the Indian Rebellion of 1857.

=== The Marathas ===
The Marathas
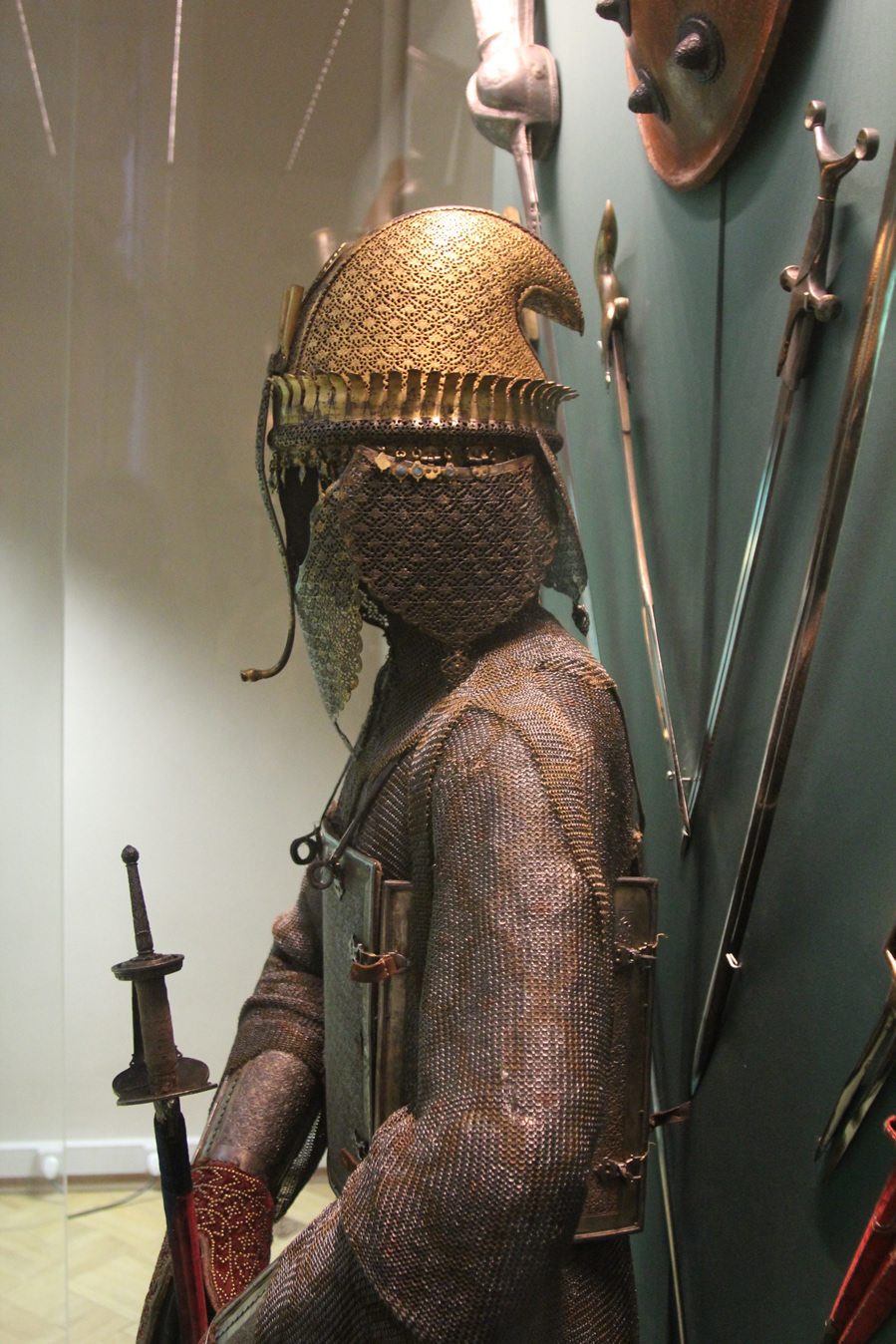
Maratha Helmet and Armor

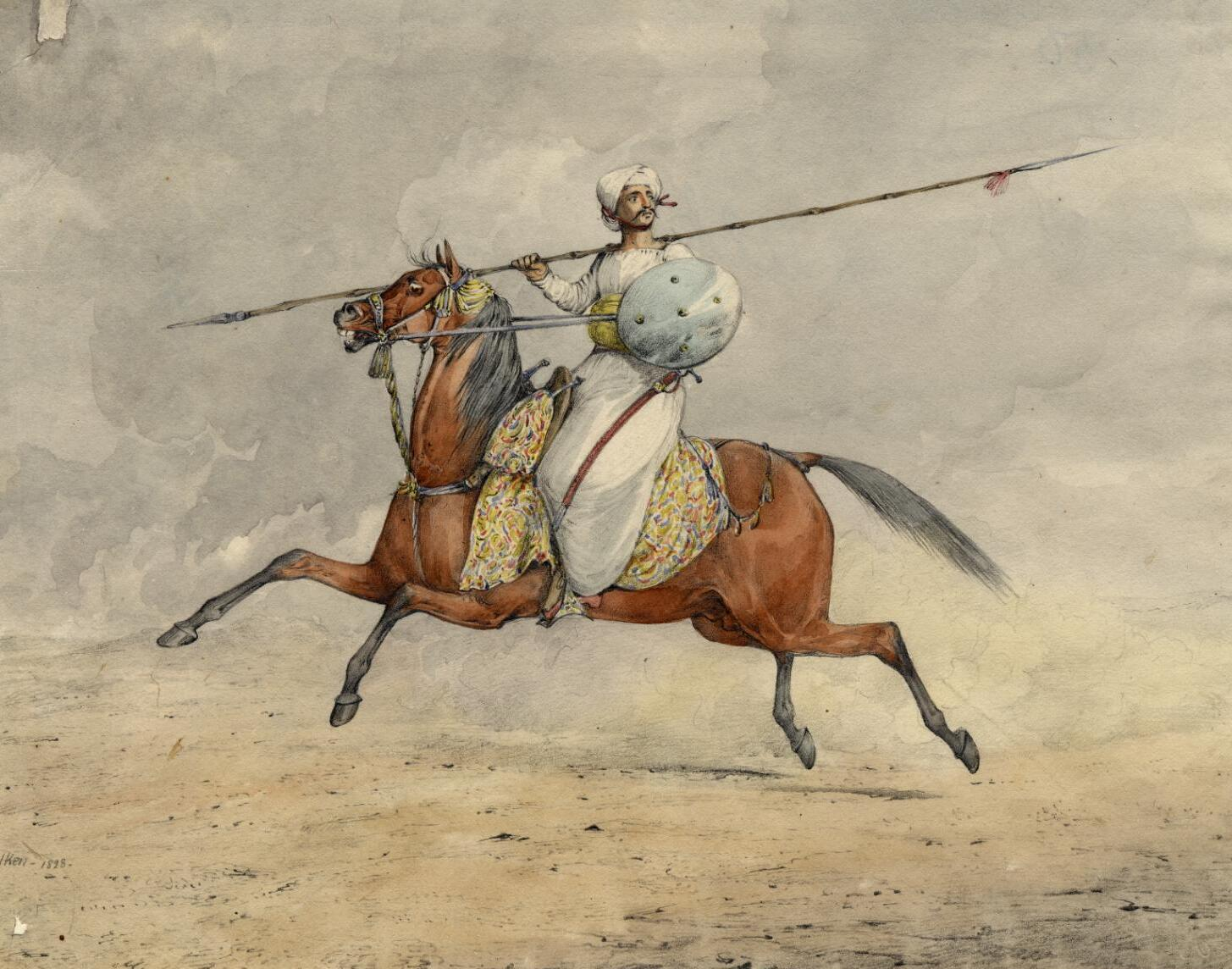
Maratha Light Horseman

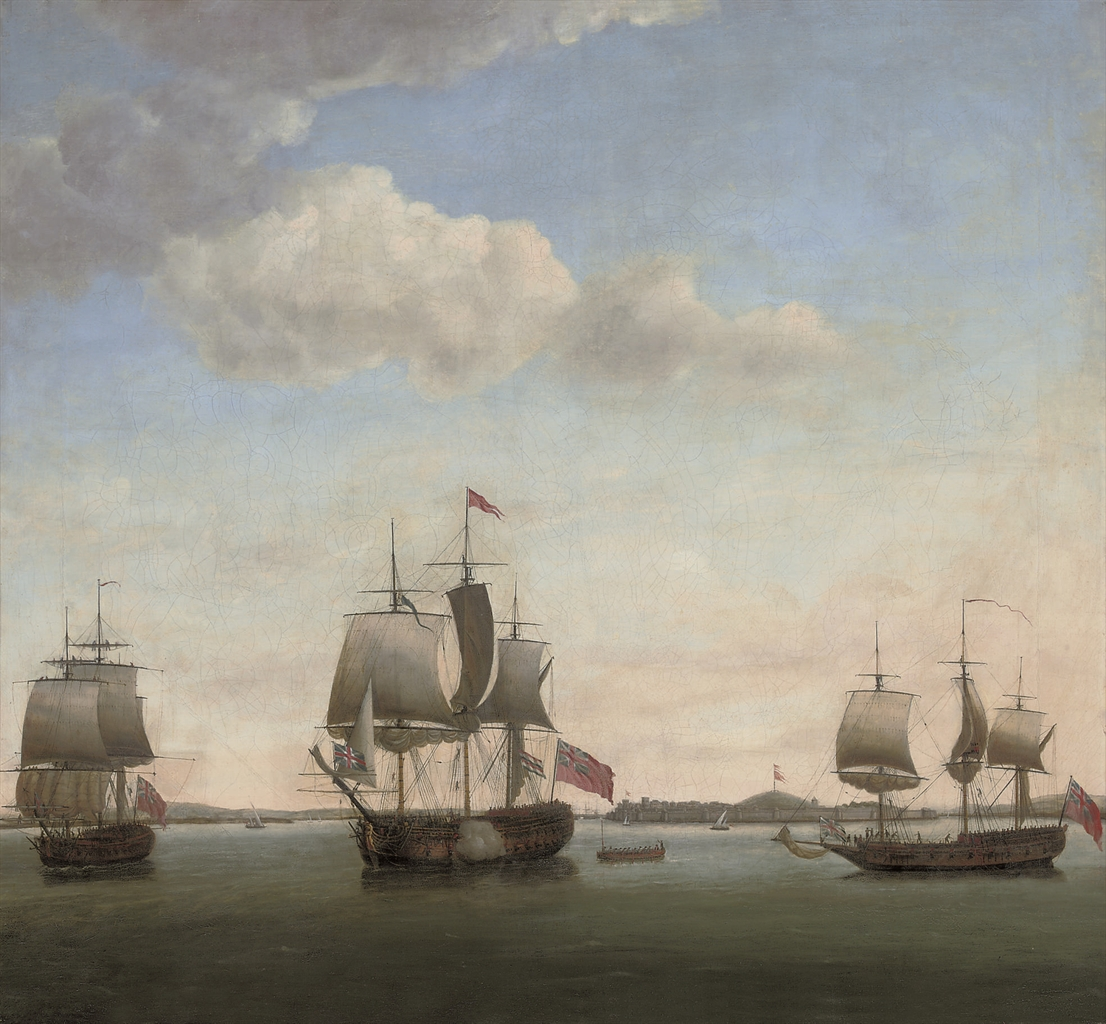
A depiction of a British naval attack in 1755 against the Maratha Navy at Suvarnadurg.

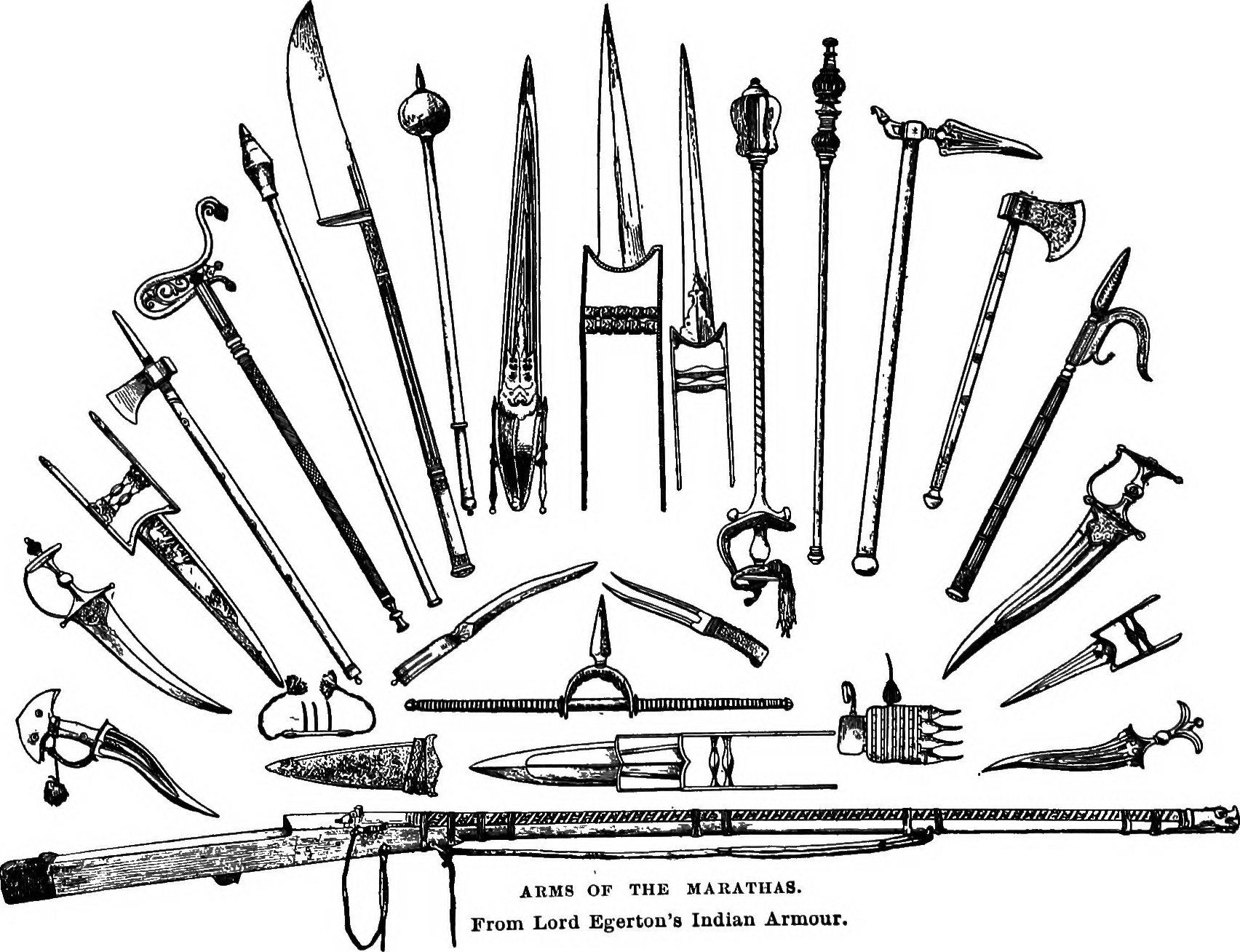
Arms of Maratha

In 1674, Shivaji carved an independent Maratha zone around Pune, Maharashtra, from the Bijapur Sultanate and, with that began the emergence of the Marathas as the most important power in India that filled the vacuum created by the decline of the Mughal Empire. Shivaji established an effective civil and military administration. After a lifetime of conquest and guerrilla warfare with the Mughal emperor Aurangzeb, Shivaji died in 1680, leaving behind a kingdom of great but ill-defined extent. This was followed by a period of instability ending with Aurangzeb's death.

Shivaji was the second king in Indian history to maintain an active navy. Kanhoji Angre, the first Maratha naval chief under Shivaji's grandson Shahuji, controlled illegal entries into Maratha territory by Dutch, English and Portuguese commercial ships on the Western coast of India in the early 18th century. He remained undefeated until his death in 1729.

Although the descendants of Shivaji continued to rule, the office of the Peshwa, or the prime minister, became the focus of Maratha power and patronage. The Peshwas were the effective rulers of the Maratha state and oversaw the period of greatest Maratha expansion, brought to an end by the Maratha's defeat by an Afghan army at the Third Battle of Panipat in 1761. The Marathas recovered their position as the dominant power in India by 1772 until the last Peshwa, Baji Rao II, was defeated by the British in the Third Anglo-Maratha War. With the defeat of the Marathas, no native power represented a threat for the British any longer. The end of the last Anglo-Maratha War marked the era of British paramountcy over India.

The Marathas also developed a potent Navy circa 1660s, which at its peak, dominated the territorial waters of the western coast of India from Mumbai to Savantwadi. It would engage in attacking the British, Portuguese, Dutch, and Siddi Naval ships and kept a check on their naval ambitions. The Maratha Navy dominated until around the 1730s, was in a state of decline by the 1770s, and ceased to exist by 1818.

=== The Jats ===
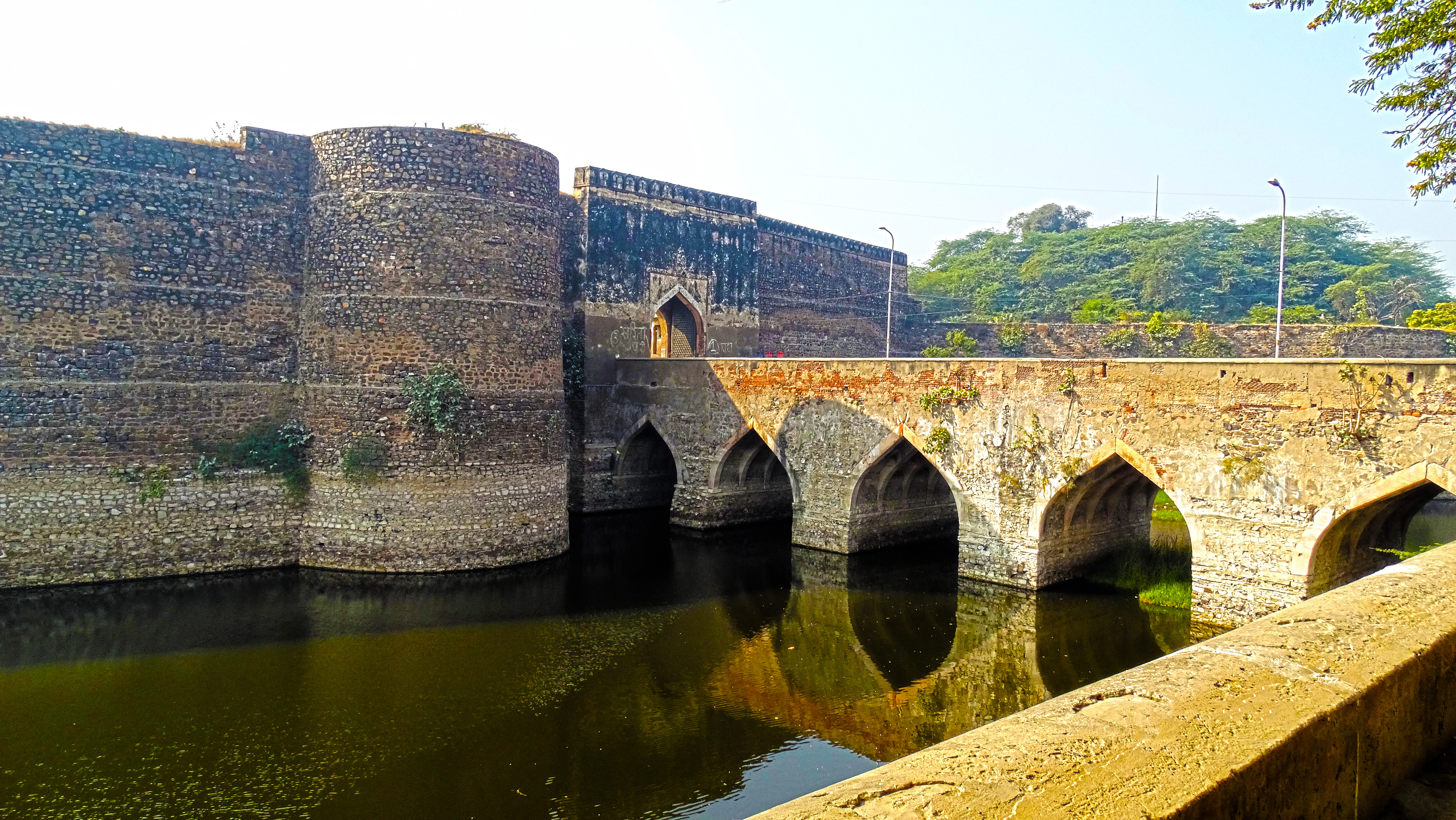
Lohagarh Fort, Bharatpur, Rajasthan

The Kingdom of Bharatpur was founded by Jats in northern India in 1680 AD. The formation of the Kingdom of Bharatpur was a result of revolts by the Jats living in the region around Delhi, Agra, and Mathura against the imperial Mughals. Gokula, a local Jat zamindar of Mathura, lead the first of such revolts in 1669. Even though the Jats were defeated and Gokula was executed, the movement was not completely crushed and discontent continued to simmer. Under Maharaja Suraj Mal, the Kingdom of Bharatpur expanded to the present-day districts of Agra, Aligarh, Bharatpur, Dholpur, Etawa, Gurgaon, Hathras, Mainpuri, Mathura, Mewat, Meerut, Rewari, and Rohtak.

=== Travancore Kingdom ===
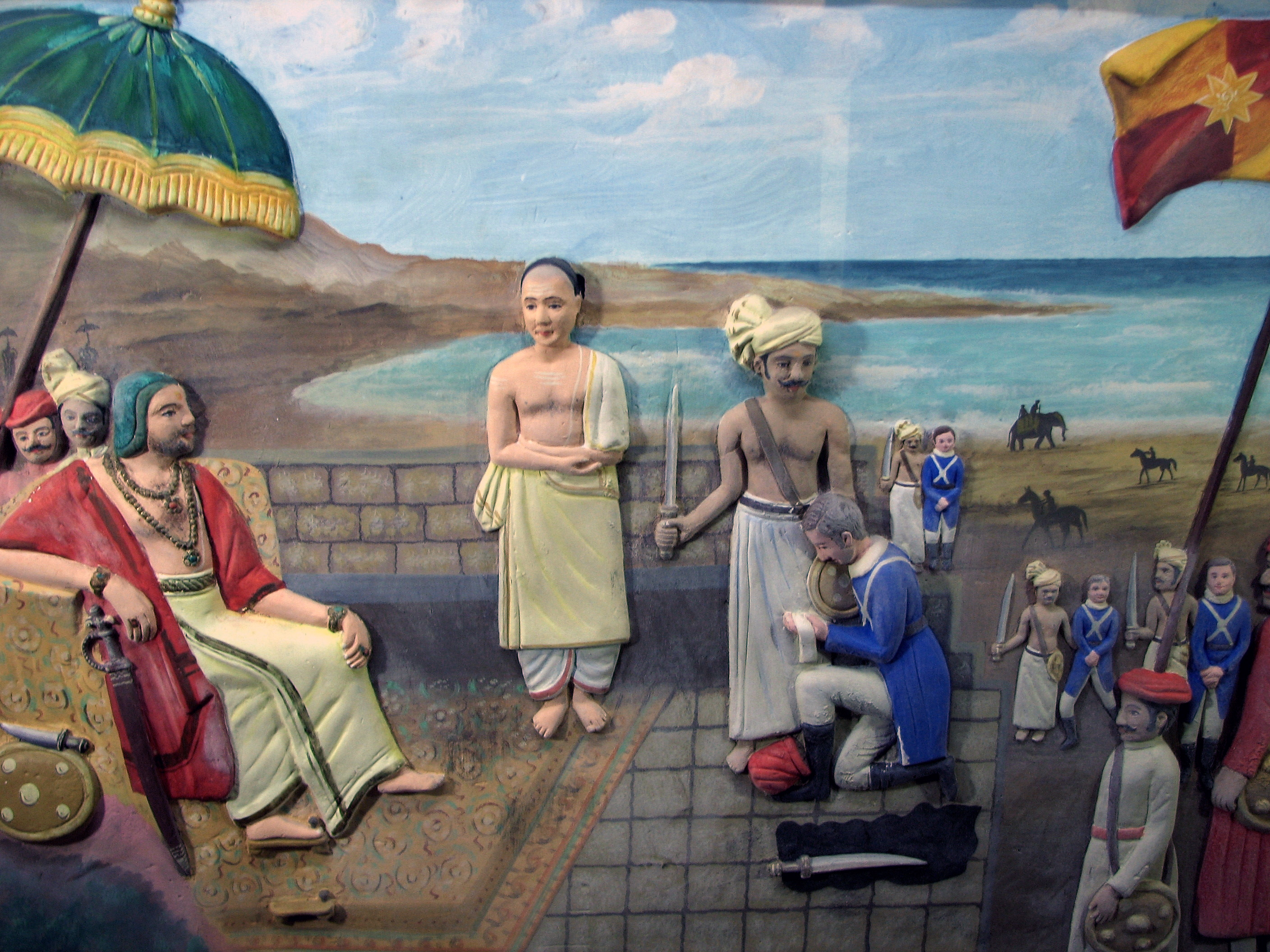
Eustachius De Lannoy of the Dutch East India Company surrenders to Maharaja Marthanda Varma of the Kingdom of Travancore after the Battle of Colachel. (Depiction at Padmanabhapuram Palace)

King Marthanda Varma inherited the small feudal state of Venad in 1723 and built it into Travancore, one of the most powerful kingdoms in southern India. Marthanda Varma led the Travancore forces during the Travancore-Dutch War of 1739–46, which culminated in the Battle of Colachel. The defeat of the Dutch by Travancore is considered the earliest example of an organised power from Asia overcoming European military technology and tactics. Marthanda Varma went on to conquer most of the petty principalities of the native rulers who had allied with the Dutch against him.

During Dharma Raja's reign, Tipu Sultan invaded Travancore, but the commander-in-chief Raja Kesavadas led Travancore to victory despite being outnumbered. This attack resulted in a Travancore-British alliance against Tipu in the Third Anglo-Mysore War. Velu Thampi Dalawa, the Dewan of Travancore, fought against the British Empire but lost. Travancore became a British vassal kingdom in 1805 following a treaty between Colonel Charles Macaulay and Dewan Velu Thampi.

=== Mysore Kingdom ===
The first iron-cased and metal-cylinder rockets were developed by the Mysorean army of the South Indian Kingdom of Mysore in the 1780s. The Mysoreans successfully used these iron-cased rockets against the larger forces of the British East India Company during the Anglo-Mysore Wars.

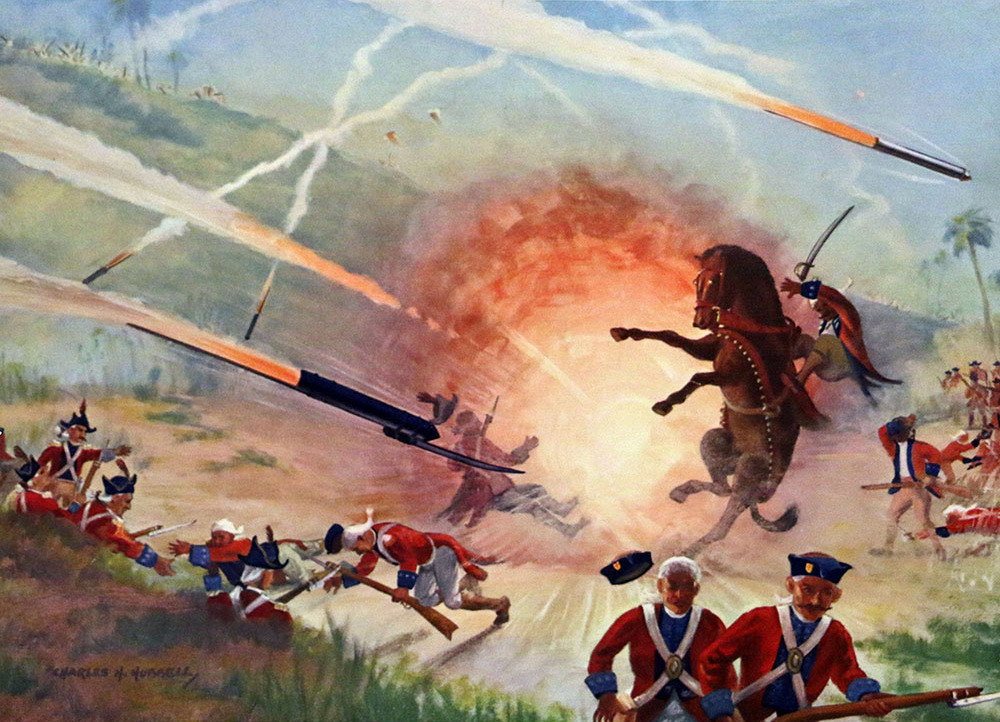
A painting showing the Mysorean army fighting the British forces with Mysorean rockets, which used metal cylinders to contain the combustion powder.

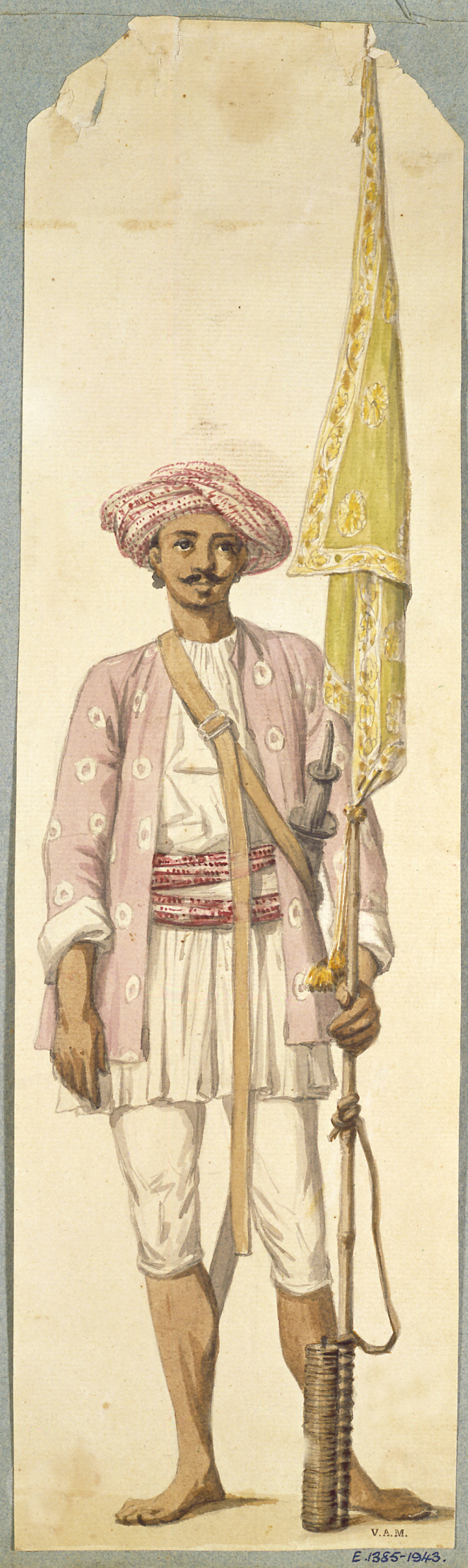
A Mysorean soldier from India, using his Mysorean rocket as a flagstaff (Robert Home, 1793/4).

=== Sikh Empire ===
Sikh Empire
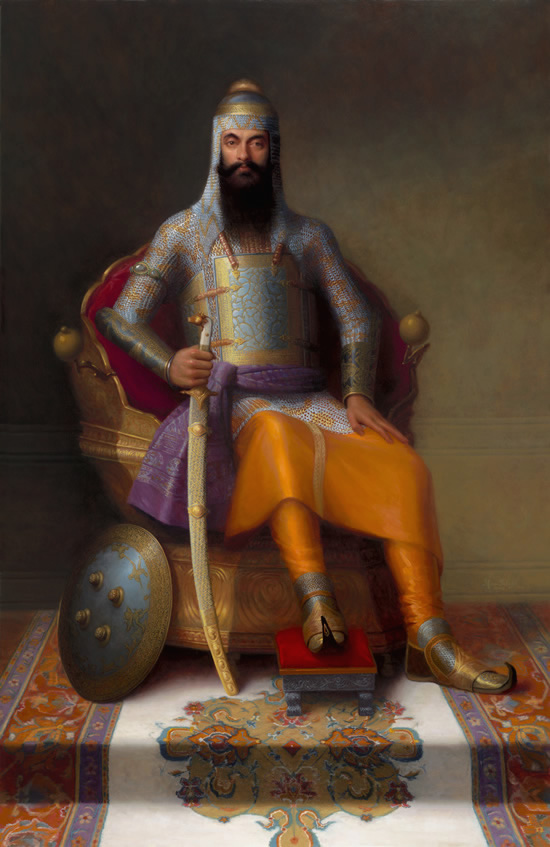
Maharaja Ranjit Singh, the founder of the Sikh Empire.

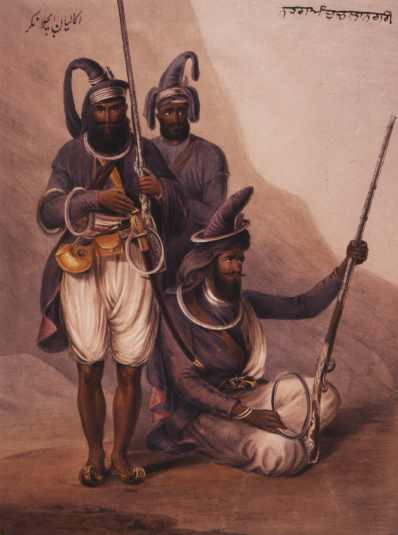
Nihang Abchal Nagar, turban-wearing Sikh religious warriors with chakrams.

Maharaja Ranjit Singh was a Sikh king of the sovereign country of Punjab and the Sikh Empire. His father Maha Singh led Sukerchakia, a misl within the Sikh Confederacy. Born in 1780 in Gujranwala, Ranjit Singh succeeded his father at the age of 12. He united the Sikh factions into the Sikh Empire and took the title "Maharaja" on 13 April 1801, to coincide with Baisakhi. Lahore was his capital from 1799. In 1802 he conquered Amritsar, a holy city of the Sikh religion. In 1822 Ranjit Singh hired European mercenaries for the first time to train a part of his troops. He modernized his army, creating a military force whose power delayed the eventual British colonization of Punjab. The result was a powerful and heavily armed state. The Battle of Jamrud in 1837 was a major setback for Ranjit Singh: his general Hari Singh Nalwa was killed, the Khyber Pass was established as the western limit of the Sikh Empire's influence.

Ranjit Singh died in 1839, and his empire crumbled under internal strife and poor governance by his heirs. On the east of his realm Gulab Singh extended Sikh authority in the Himalayas until stopped by the Qing Empire in the Sino-Sikh war (1841–1842). After the First Anglo-Sikh War (1845–46), Punjab effectively ceased to be an independent state. The British Empire annexed the Sikh Empire following the Second Anglo-Sikh War (1848–49).

== Colonial era ==
=== Company rule ===
The British East India Company raised armies initially to guard its factories.Following the fall of French Pondichéry in 1793, this was divided into Presidency armies of Bengal, Madras and Bombay in 1795. The Dutch trained the Nair Brigade, the military of Travancore.

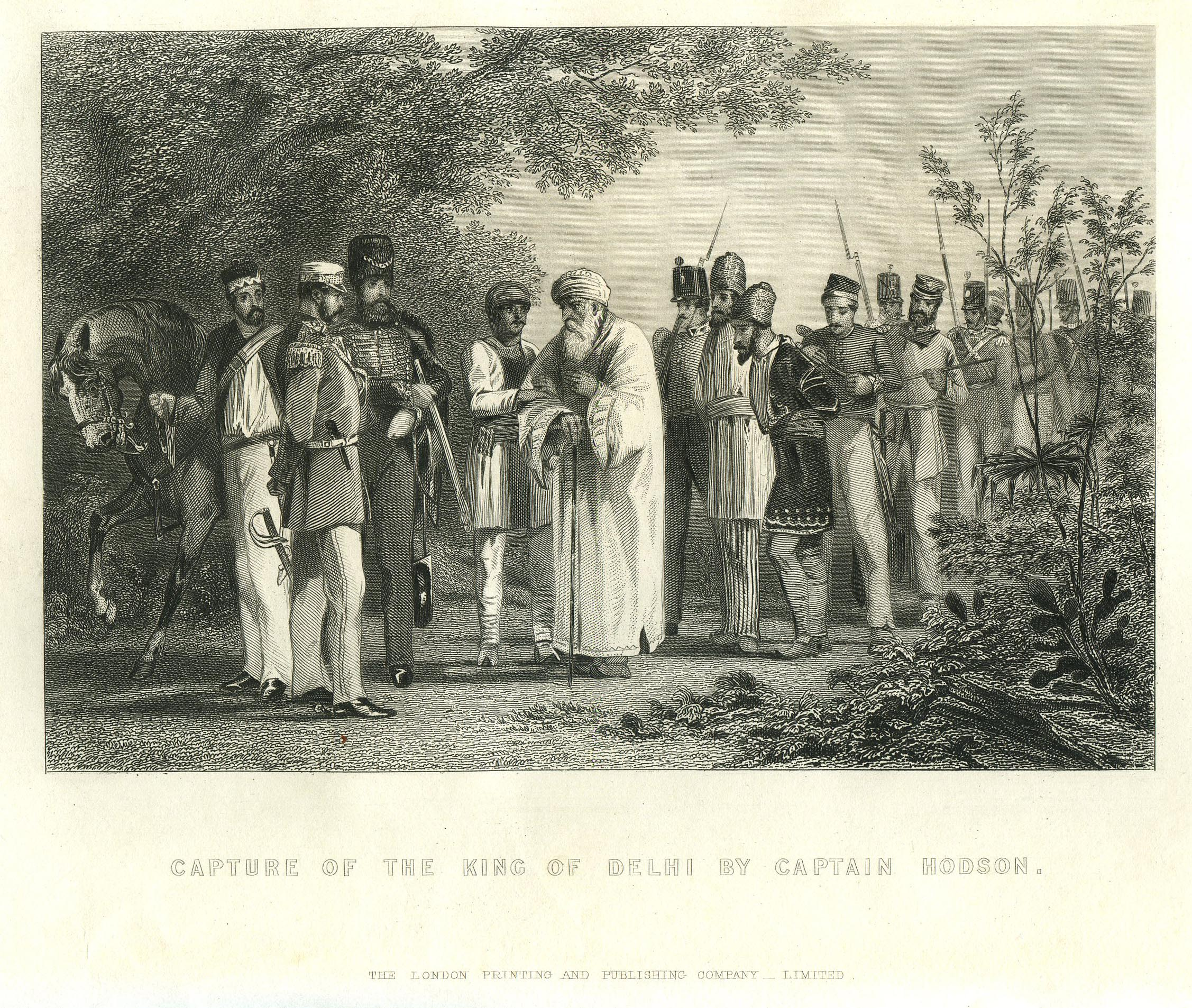
Capture of Bahadur Shah Zafar and his sons by William Hodson at Humayun's tomb on 20 September 1857.

During the Indian Rebellion of 1857, some units of the Bengal Native Infantry and Cavalry mutinied against the British East India Company. However, the rebels received less support than they had expected from members of the Bombay and Madras Armies. A number of atrocities were perpetrated by the rebels, most infamously at the Siege of Cawnpore. The rebellion ultimately failed because of lack of resources and coordination among the rebels. During their suppression of the rebellion, the British carried out numerous reprisals, and the revolt was largely quashed by 1858.

=== The British Raj ===
British Rule
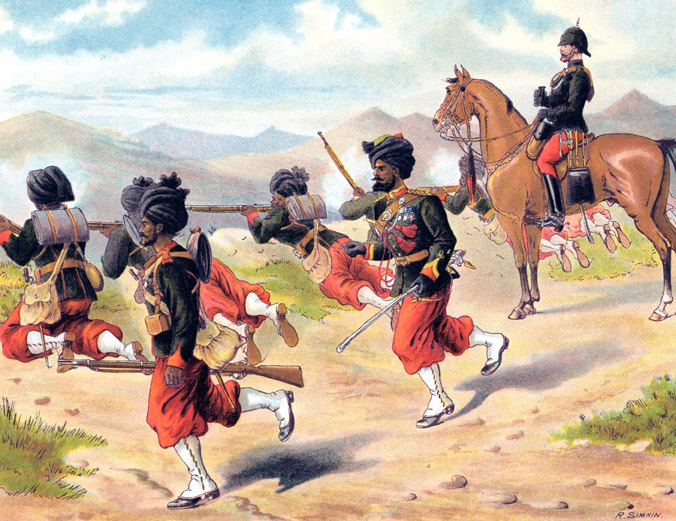
Bombay Native Infantry

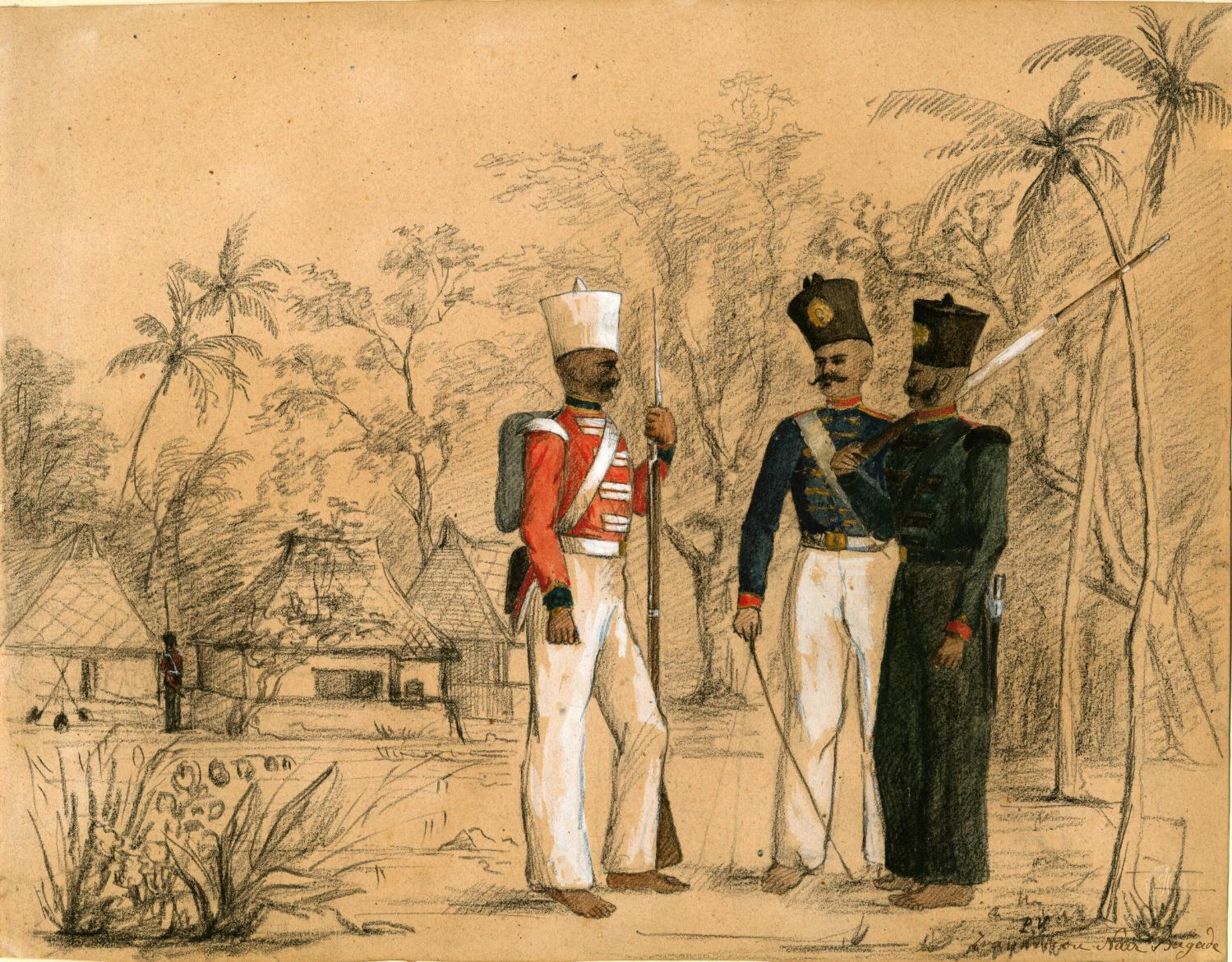
Members of a Nair brigade in the service of the British, as painted by the Swiss artist Paul Aimé Vallouy.

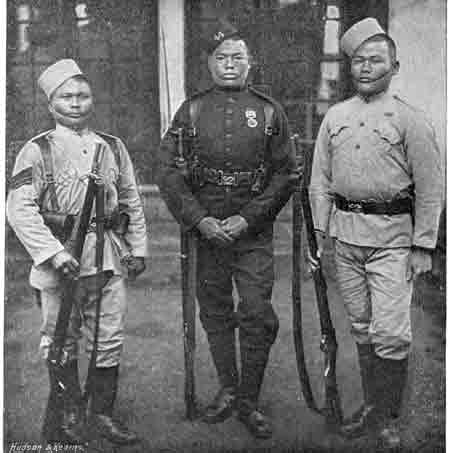
Gurkha Soldiers (1896). The centre figure wears the dark green dress uniform worn by all Gurkhas in British service, with certain regimental distinctions.

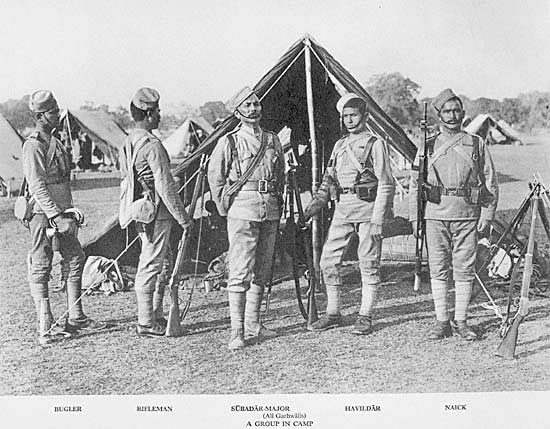
39th Garhwal Rifles in a camp.

Following the Sepoy Mutiny, British rule in India was reorganised under the British Raj, made up of areas directly administered by the United Kingdom and princely states under the paramountcy of the British Crown. Under terms of treaties with the Crown, these princely states were allowed some local autonomy in exchange for protection and representation in international affairs by the United Kingdom. The Raj included present-day India, Pakistan, and Bangladesh.

After 1857, the Presidency armies were abolished in favour of a reconstituted British Indian Army under the control of the British Crown and the Viceroy. A number of units were disbanded or reorganised, and new units of Sikhs, Gurkhas, and irregular horsemen were introduced. The majority of the Madras Native Infantry and Cavalry had their class compositions changed to North Indian tribes, considered more "martial" than the darker, shorter "thambis" who made up the majority of the Madras Presidency Army. Indian sepoys were banned from serving as officers or in the artillery corps. Recruiting focused more on Sikhs and Gurkhas, whom the British viewed as loyal. New caste-based and religion-based regiments were formed.

The British Indian Army consisted of members of all the major religious groups in India: Hindus, Sikhs, Christians, and Muslims. The number of Sikhs in the army grew steadily with time as British commanders came to believe they were more loyal and martial, an impression reinforced by their conduct during the Sepoy Mutiny. The Sikhs, for their part, aligned with the British to prevent a resurgence of Mughal rule; Sikhs had been persecuted under the Mughal Empire.

The Indian Air Force was established in 1932.

==== World War I ====
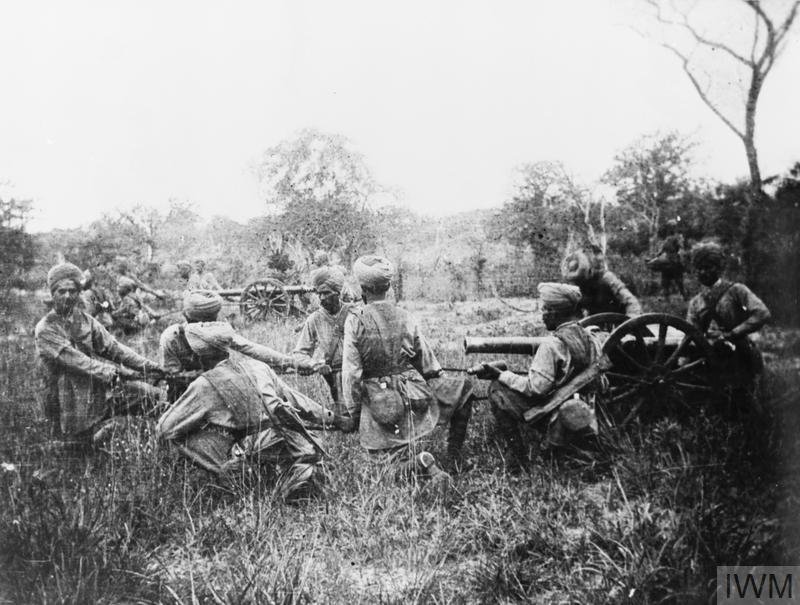
The Kashmir Mountain Battery in action at Nyangao against Mahiwa (in German East Africa), 16–19 October 1917.

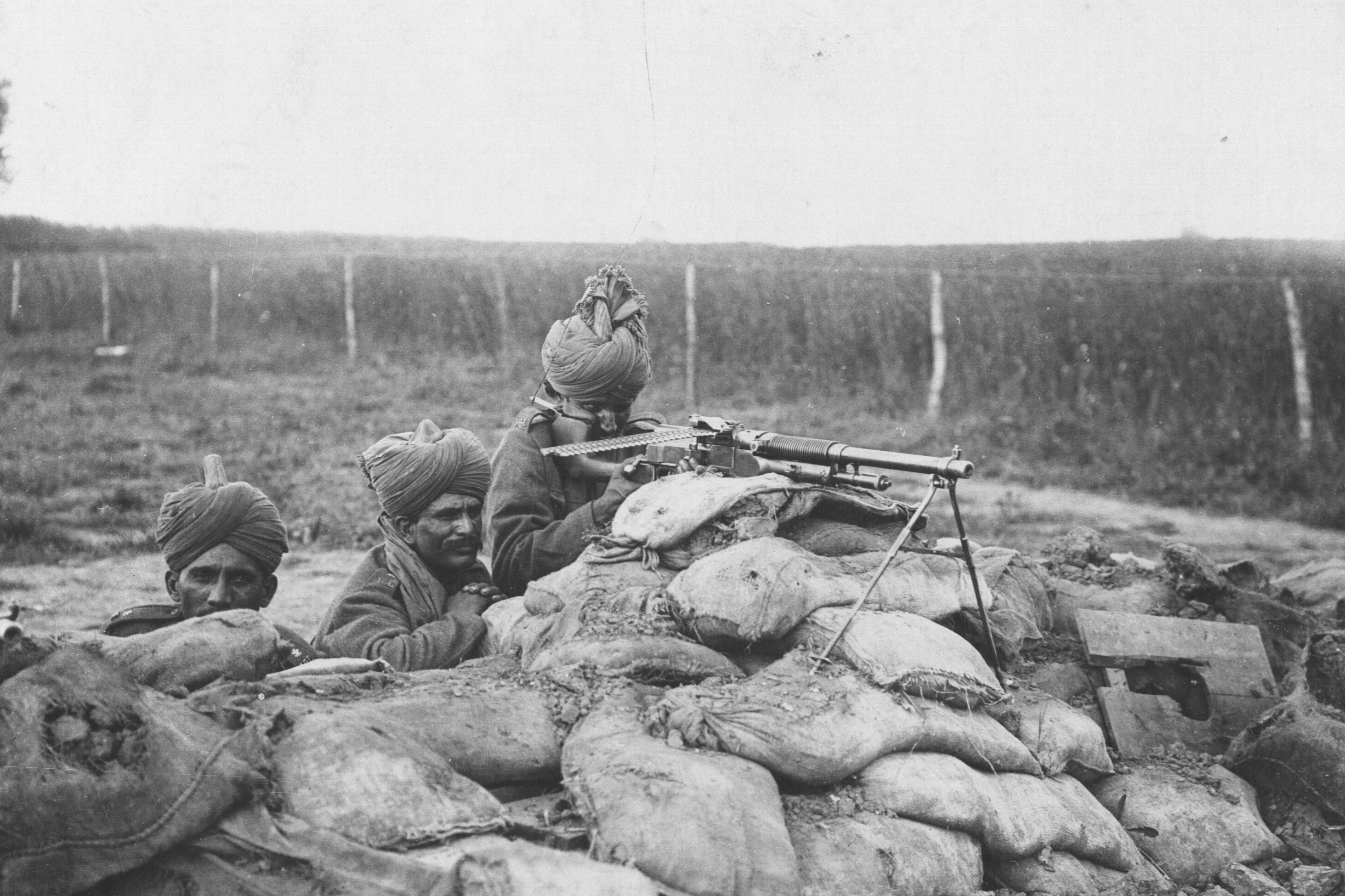
2nd Rajput Light Infantry in action in Flanders

During World War I, over 800,000 volunteered for the army, and more than 400,000 volunteered for non-combat roles, compared with the pre-war annual recruitment of about 15,000 men. The Army saw action on the Western Front within a month of the start of the war, at the First Battle of Ypres where Khudadad Khan became the first Indian to be awarded a Victoria Cross. After a year of front-line duty, sickness and casualties had reduced the Indian Corps to the point where it had to be withdrawn. Nearly 700,000 Indians fought the Turks in the Mesopotamian campaign. Indian formations were also sent to East Africa, Egypt, and Gallipoli.

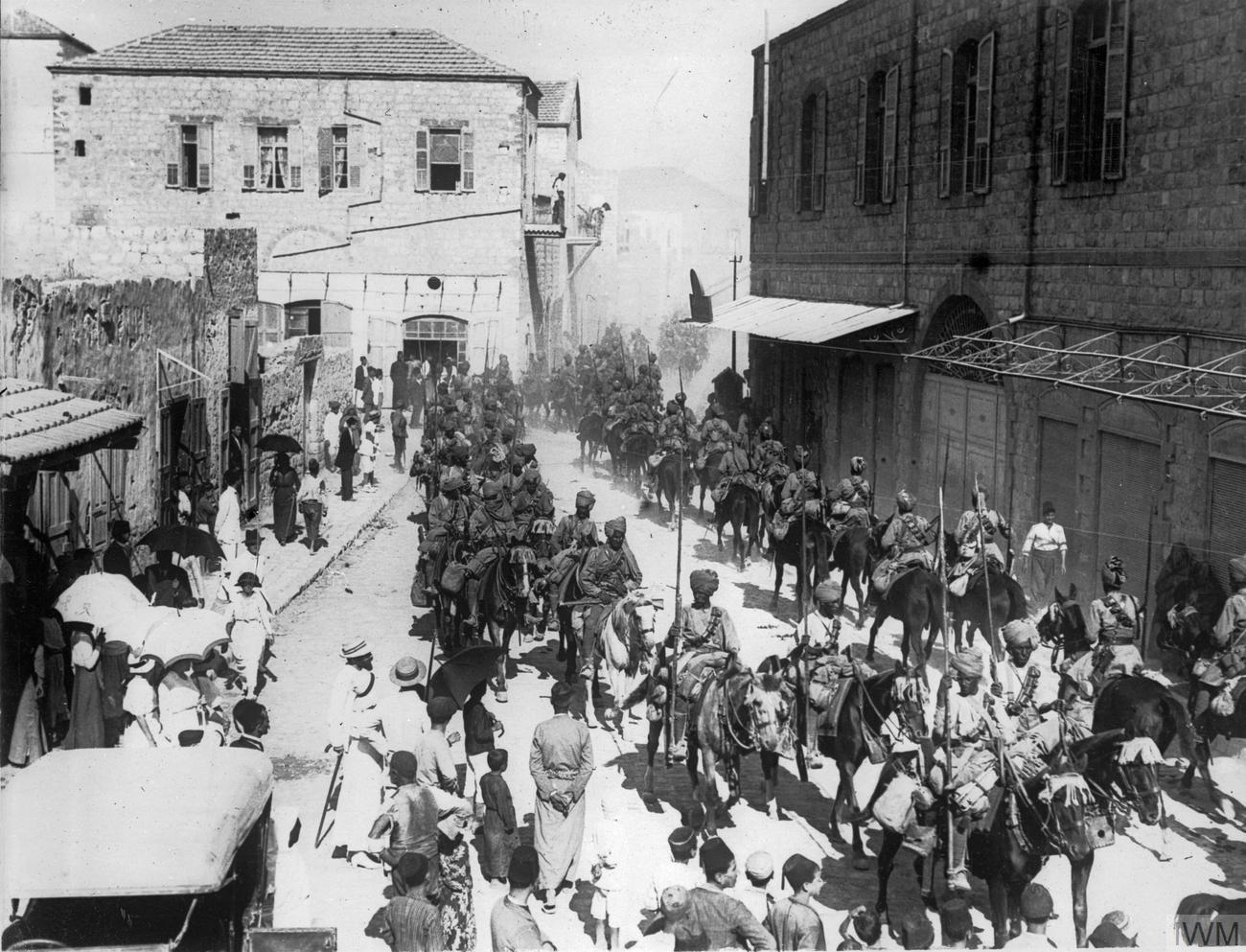
Jodhpur and Mysore lancers march through Haifa.

Indian Army and Imperial Service Troops fought during the Sinai and Palestine Campaign's defence of the Suez Canal in 1915, at Romani in 1916 and to Jerusalem in 1917. Indian units occupied the Jordan Valley and after the German spring offensive they became the major force in the Egyptian Expeditionary Force during the Battle of Megiddo and in the Desert Mounted Corps' advance to Damascus and on to Aleppo. Other divisions remained in India guarding the North-West Frontier and fulfilling internal security obligations.

One million Indian troops served abroad during the war. In total, 74,187 died, and another 67,000 were wounded. The roughly 90,000 soldiers who lost their lives fighting in World War I and the Afghan Wars are commemorated by the India Gate.

==== World War II ====
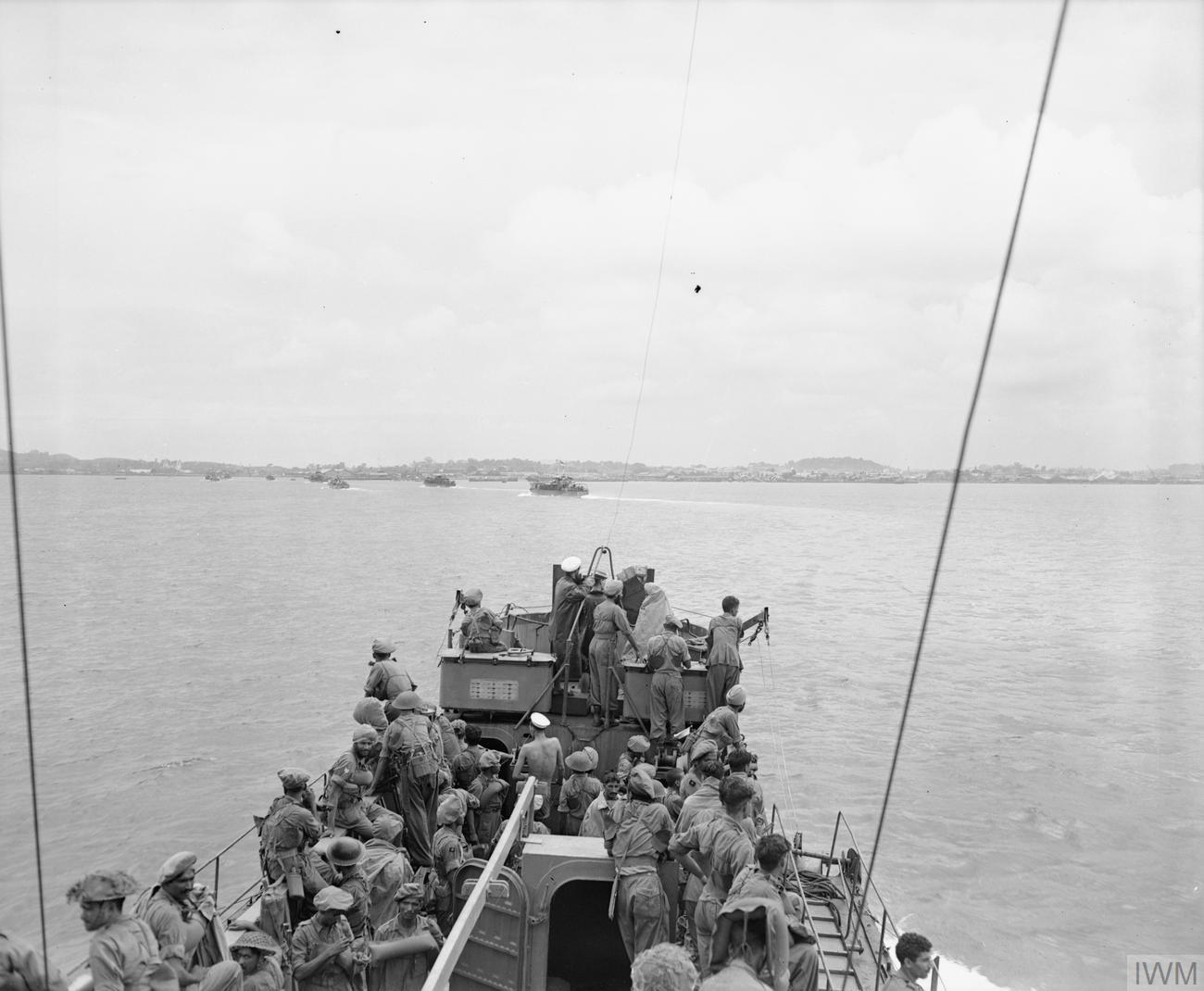
Royal Indian Navy landing craft enter bay at Singapore, 1944.

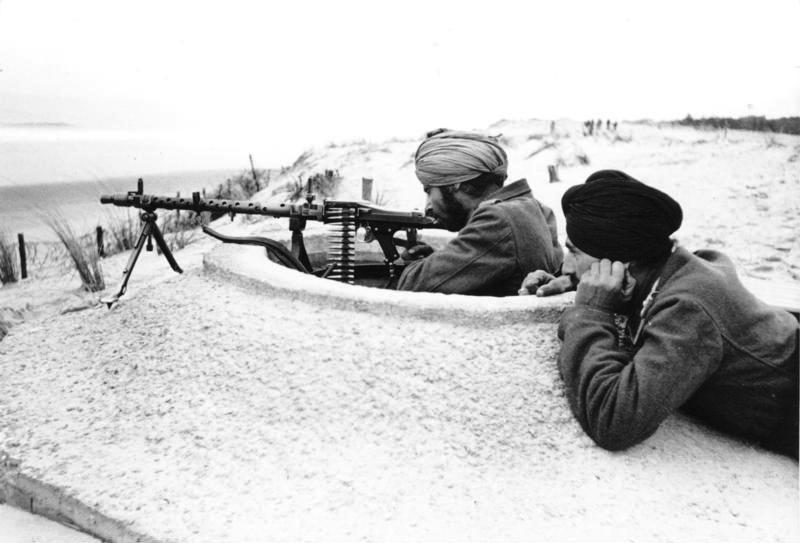
Sikh soldiers of the Indian Legion guarding the Atlantic Wall in France in March 1944. Subhas Chandra Bose initiated the legion's formation, and intended for it to serve as a liberation force for British-controlled India.

In 1939, the British Indian Army's strength was about 189,000, with about 3,000 British officers and 1,115 Indian officers. The army was expanded greatly to fight in World War II: by 1945, the strength of the Army had risen to about 2.5 million, with about 34,500 British officers and 15,740 Indian officers. The Army took part in campaigns in France, East Africa, North Africa, Syria, Tunisia, Malaya, Burma, Greece, Sicily and Italy. Particularly significant contributions came in the campaigns in Abyssinia and North Africa, against the Italians; at El Alamain and in Italy, against the Germans; and in the Burma Campaign against Japan. The army ultimately suffered 179,935 casualties: 24,338 killed, 64,354 wounded, 11,762 missing, and 79,481 taken [Prisoner of war].

During the war, Indian nationalist expatriates in Southeast Asia and the Japanese Army formed the Indian National Army (INA) to fight for Indian independence from Britain. For manpower, it relied on the approximately 45,000 Indian troops of the Indian Army whom the Japanese captured when Singapore fell in February 1942. Subhas Chandra Bose was parachuted in to lead the INA in 1943, and he greatly expanded the INA to include the mainly Tamil civilian Indian community in Malaya. He also negotiated a combat role for the INA from the reluctant Japanese, who were more inclined to use it intelligence and propaganda work. In 1944, INA units participated in the Japanese Army's offensives against British positions in the Arakan and the Imphal Plain. Not being a military man Bose – or "Netaji" (respected leader) naively believed that Indian soldiers of the Indian Army who deployed against the INA would flock to its standard. But these Indian troops stood fIrm, and actually defeated the INA. Despite this, Bose insisted that the INA be given an independent sector on the Irrawaddy in February 1945. Despite the desperate efforts of some INA troops, their sector was overrun, and desertions became commonplace. Militarily, the INA was finished. After the war, however, it made a political impact, due to the British decision to publicly court-martial three INA commanders. This was a miscalculation, because Indian nationalist politicians, who had previously come out against the INA, now whipped up popular sentiment for the release of the INA accused. Realizing their error, the British acquiesced. In this way, the INA was another sign that the Raj's days were numbered.

== Post-war transition and the Dominion of India ==
At the end of the war in 1945, the Indian Army's officer corps included Indian Medical Service officer Hiraji Cursetji as its sole Indian major-general, one IMS brigadier, three Indian brigadiers in combatant arms and 220 other Indian officers in the temporary or acting ranks of colonel and lieutenant-colonel. From October 1945, the granting of regular commissions in the Indian Armed Forces was restricted to Indians, though provisions were made for the continued secondment of British officers for as long as was deemed necessary. In 1946, sailors of the Royal Indian Navy mutinied on board ships and in shore establishments, which had an impact across India. By early 1947, all three branches of the Indian Armed Forces had undergone large-scale demobilisation of over 1.25 million service personnel.

With Indian independence now a certainty and with a new Labour government recently elected in the UK, the Indianization of the armed forces continued to progress, though by June 1947, two months before independence, the Indian Army had only 14 Indian officers at the rank of brigadier serving in combatant arms, with no Indian flag, general or air officers in the combat arms of the armed services.

== Republic of India ==
=== Major wars ===
The Republic of India has fought four wars with Pakistan and one border war with China.

==== First Indo-Pakistani war, 1947 ====
This is also called the First Kashmir War. The war started in October 1947 when Pakistan feared that the Maharajah of the princely state of Kashmir and Jammu would accede to India. Following partition, states were left to choose whether to join India or Pakistan or to remain independent. Jammu and Kashmir, the largest of the princely states, had a predominantly Muslim population ruled by the Hindu Maharaja Hari Singh. Tribal forces with support from the army of Pakistan attacked and occupied parts of the princely state forcing the Maharajah to sign the Agreement to the accession of the princely state to the Dominion of India to get Indian military aid. The UN Security Council passed the Resolution 47 on 22 April 1948. The fronts solidified gradually along what came to be known as the Line of Control. A formal cease-fire was declared at 23:59 on the night of 1 January 1949. India gained control of about two-thirds of the state (including Kashmir valley, Jammu and Ladakh) whereas Pakistan gained roughly a third of Kashmir (Azad Kashmir and Gilgit–Baltistan). Most neutral assessments, agree that India was the victor of the war as it was able to conquer about two-thirds of the Kashmir including Kashmir valley, Jammu and Ladakh.

==== Operation Polo, 1948 ====
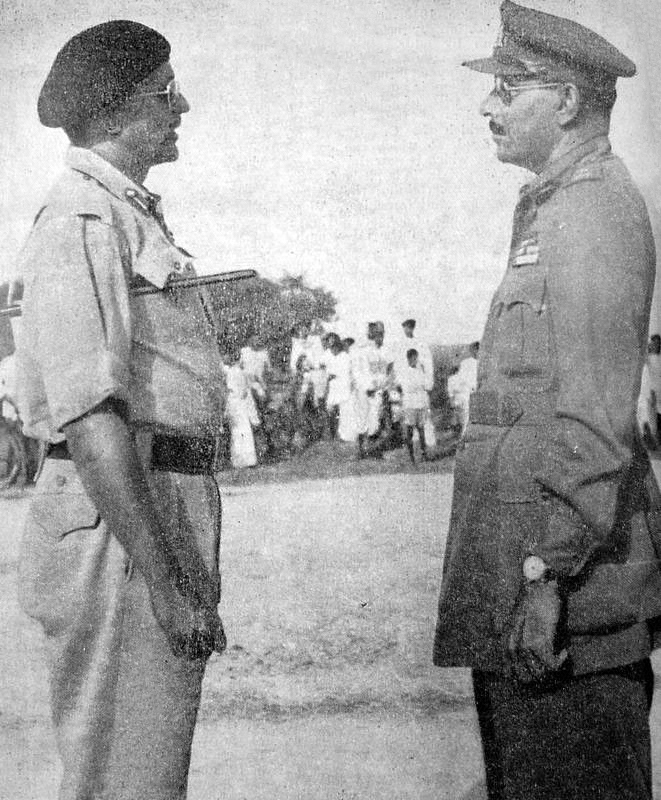
Maj. Gen. El Edroos (right) surrenders to Maj. Gen. Joyanto Nath Chaudhuri at Secunderabad.

After the war with Pakistan, India turned its attention to the independent Hyderabad State. India perceived the nearby independent Muslim state and potential Pakistani ally as a threat. In a five-day operation, India reconquered and annexed Hyderabad.

==== Liberation of Goa, 1961 ====
In 1961 tension rose between India and Portugal over the Portuguese-occupied territory of Goa, which India claimed for itself. After Portuguese police cracked down violently on a peaceful, unarmed demonstration for union with India, the Indian government decided to reconquer. A lopsided air, sea, and ground campaign resulted in the speedy surrender of Portuguese forces. Within 36 hours, 451 years of Portuguese colonial rule was ended, and Goa was annexed by India. Portuguese losses were 34 killed, 57 wounded, and 3,306 captured. Indian losses were 22 killed and 51 wounded.

==== Sino-Indian war, 1962 ====
India fought a month-long border war against China in 1962. Neither nation deployed air or naval resources during a conflict heavy with mountain combat. China ended the war by declaring a unilateral ceasefire and withdrew their forces to the pre-war positions.

The defeat prompted India to make major changes in its military. The Department of Defence Production was established to create an indigenous defence production base, which would be self-reliant and self-sufficient. Since 1962, 16 new ordnance factories have been built under the program.

==== Second Indo-Pakistani war, 1965 ====
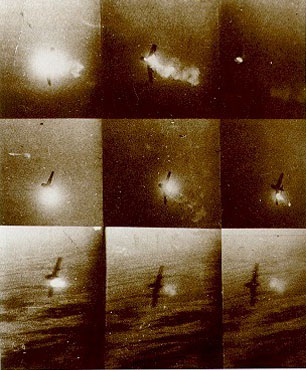
Pakistani Sabre being shot down in combat by an Indian Gnat in September 1965 as seen from the Indian aircraft.

This war started following Pakistan's Operation Gibraltar, which was designed to infiltrate forces into Jammu and Kashmir to precipitate an insurgency against rule by India. India retaliated by launching a full-scale military attack on West Pakistan. The seventeen-day war caused thousands of casualties on both sides and also witnessed the largest tank battle since World War II. The hostilities between the two countries ended after a ceasefire was declared following diplomatic intervention by the Soviet Union and USA and the subsequent issuance of the Tashkent Declaration. Though ruled to be militarily inconclusive, both India and Pakistan claimed victory. Most neutral assessments, however, agree that India had the upper hand over Pakistan when the ceasefire was declared. As Pakistan lost more territory than it gained during the war and failed to achieve its goal of capturing Kashmir, some impartial observers have viewed the result as a defeat for Pakistan and an Indian strategic victory.

=== Indo-Sino Clash of 1967 ===
The 1967 Sino-Indian clash also known as the Sino-Indian War of 1967 (1 – 10 October 1967) was a military conflict between India and China in the Himalayan Kingdom of Sikkim, then an Indian protectorate. The Chinese People's Liberation Army infiltrated Sikkim on 1 October 1967, but was repulsed by the Indian Army by 10 October. During the Cho La and Nathu La incidents, Indian losses were 88 killed in action and 163 wounded, while Chinese casualties were 340 killed in action and 450 wounded.

The end of the battle saw the Chinese Army forced to leave Sikkim after being defeated by Indian troops.

==== Third Indo-Pakistani war, 1971 ====
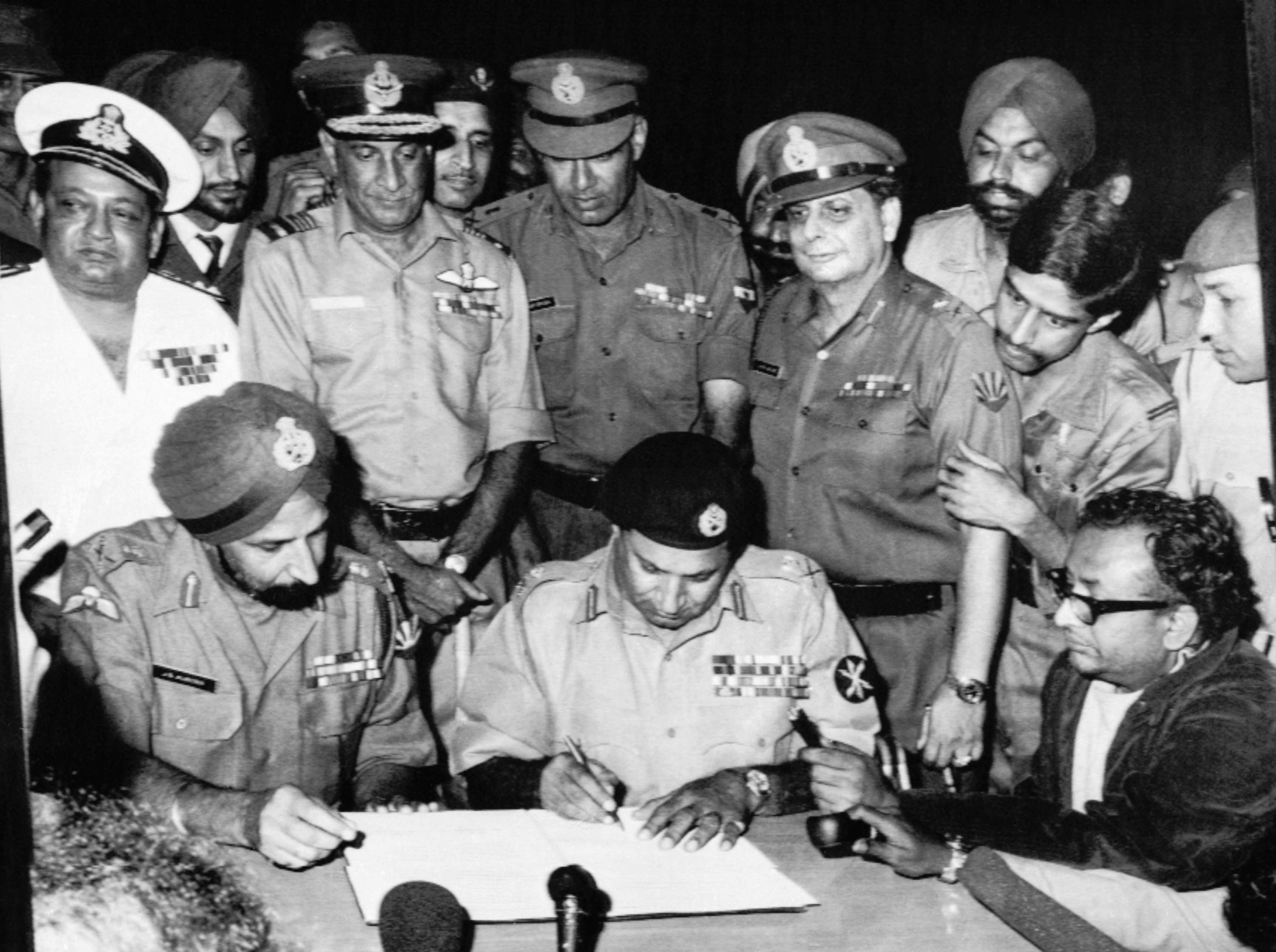
Pakistan's Lt. Gen. A. A. K. Niazi signing the instrument of surrender in Dhaka on 16 December 1971, in the presence of India's Lt. Gen. Aurora. Standing behind them are officers of India's Army, Navy and Air Force. The 1971 War directly involved participation of all three arms of Indian Armed Forces.

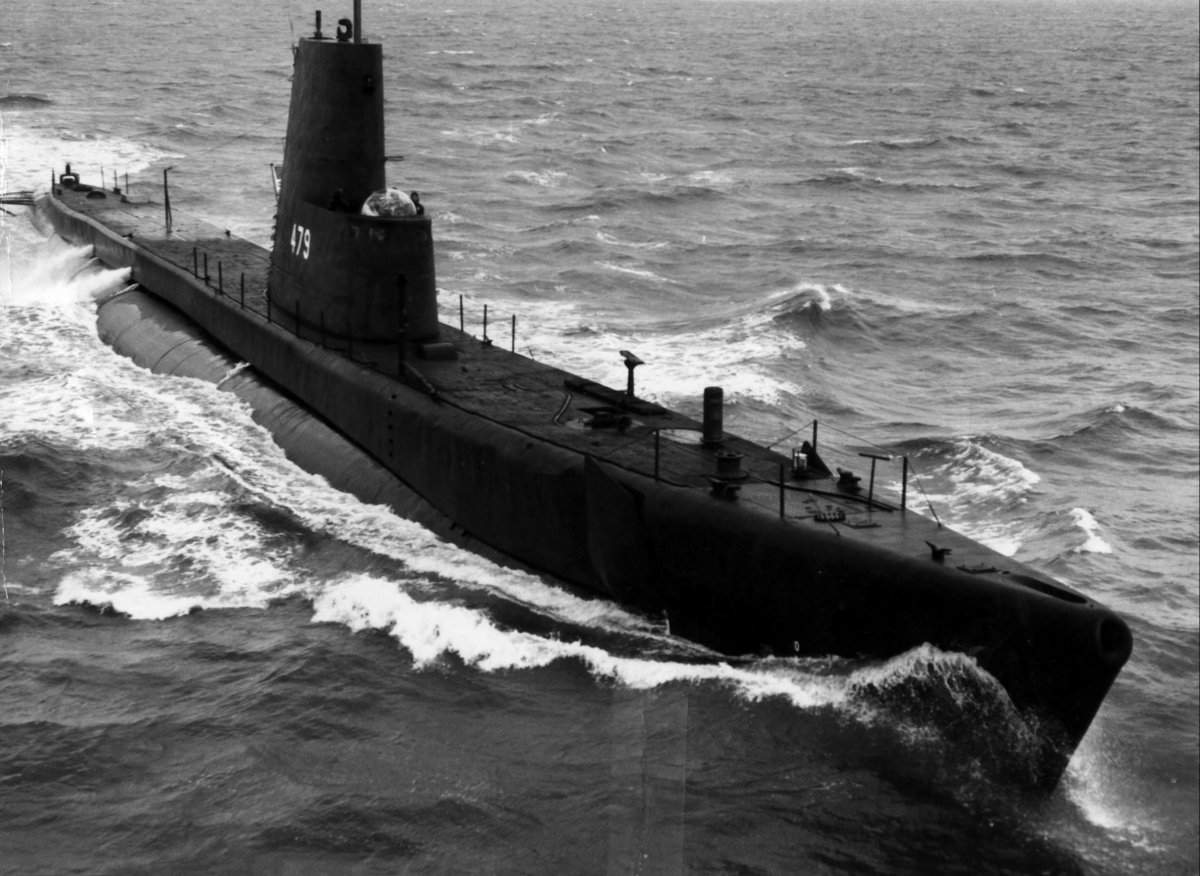
Pakistan's PNS Ghazi, the Pakistani submarine which sank off during the 1971 Indo-Pakistani War under mysterious circumstances on the Visakhapatnam coast.

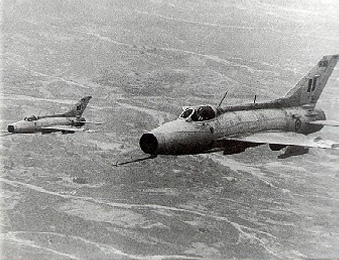
IAF Mig 21s were used extensively in East Pakistan air operations. During the war, around 7 PAF fighter jets and one transport aircraft were shot down by Mig 21.

This war was unique in the way that it did not involve the issue of Kashmir, but was rather precipitated by the crisis created by the political battle between Sheikh Mujib, Leader of East Pakistan and Yahya-Bhutto, leaders of West Pakistan brewing in erstwhile East Pakistan culminating in the declaration of Independence of Bangladesh from the state system of Pakistan. Following Operation Searchlight and the 1971 Bangladesh genocide, about 10 million Bengalis in East Pakistan took refuge in neighbouring India. India intervened in the ongoing Bangladesh liberation movement. After a large scale pre-emptive strike by Pakistan, full-scale hostilities between the two countries commenced.

Pakistan attacked at several places along India's western border with Pakistan, but the Indian Army successfully held their positions. The Indian Army quickly responded to the Pakistan Army's movements in the west and made some initial gains, including capturing around 5,795 square miles (15,010 km^{2}) of Pakistan territory (land gained by India in Pakistani Kashmir, Pakistani Punjab and Sindh sectors but gifted it back to Pakistan in the Simla Agreement of 1972, as a gesture of goodwill). Within two weeks of intense fighting, Pakistani forces in East Pakistan surrendered to the joint command of Indian and Bangladeshi forces following which the People's Republic of Bangladesh was created. This war saw the highest number of casualties in any of the India-Pakistan conflicts, as well as the largest number of prisoners of war since the Second World War after the surrender of more than 90,000 Pakistani military and civilians. In the words of one Pakistani author, "Pakistan lost half its navy, a quarter of its air force and a third of its army".

==== Siachen war, 1984 ====
In the late 1970s and early 1980s, Pakistan began organising tourist expeditions on the Siachen Glacier, disputed territory with India. Irked by this development, in April 1984 India initiated successful Operation Meghdoot during which it gained control over all of the Siachen Glacier. India has established control over all of the 70 kilometres (43 mi) long Siachen Glacier and all of its tributary glaciers, as well as the three main passes of the Saltoro Ridge immediately west of the glacier—Sia La, Bilafond La, and Gyong La. According to TIME magazine, India gained more than 1,000 square miles (3,000 km^{2}) of territory because of its military operations in Siachen. It still maintains a military base there. Pakistan tried in 1987 and in 1989 to re-take the glacier but was unsuccessful. The conflict ended with Indian Victory. Ceasefire since 2003.

==== Kargil War, 1999 ====
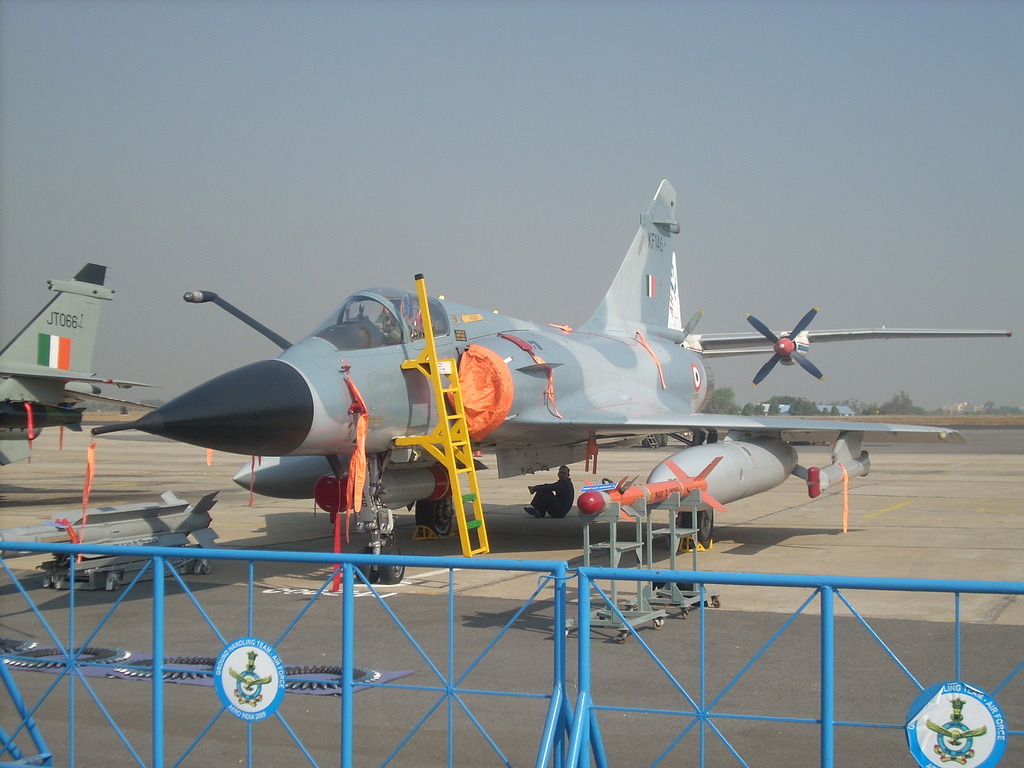
Mirage 2000s were used extensively in Kargil war and it changed the course of the war.

Commonly known as the Kargil War, or Operation Vijay in India, this conflict between the two countries was mostly limited. During early 1999, Pakistani troops infiltrated across the Line of Control (LoC) and occupied Indian territory mostly in the Kargil district. India responded by launching a major military and diplomatic offensive to drive out the Pakistani infiltrators. Two months into the conflict, Indian troops had slowly retaken most of the ridges that were encroached by the infiltrators. According to official count, an estimated 75%–80% of the intruded area and nearly all high ground was back under Indian control. Fearing large-scale escalation in military conflict, the international community, led by the United States, increased diplomatic pressure on Pakistan to withdraw forces from remaining Indian territory. Faced with the possibility of international isolation, the already fragile Pakistani economy was weakened further. The morale of Pakistani forces after the withdrawal declined as a number of units of the Northern Light Infantry suffered heavy casualties. The government refused to accept the dead bodies of many officers, an issue that provoked outrage and protests in the Northern Areas. Pakistan initially did not acknowledge a number of its casualties, but Nawaz Sharif later said that over 4,000 Pakistani troops were killed in the operation and that Pakistan had lost the conflict.

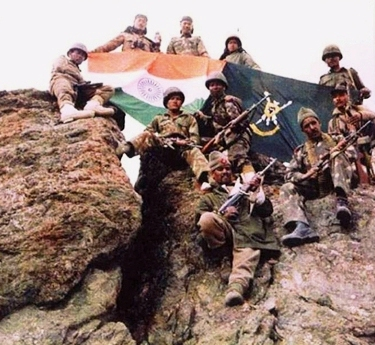
Indian soldiers after winning a battle during the Kargil War

By the end of July 1999, organized hostilities in the Kargil district had ceased and Kargil War finally came to end with a decisive Indian military and diplomatic victory.

=== Other operations ===
==== The Mizo National Front, 1966 ====
In March 1966, Mizo rebels in Assam declared independence and attacked government offices and military posts. The uprising was suppressed weeks later, and eventually Mizoram was made a separate state of India.

==== Operation Blue Star, 1984 ====
In June 1984, then-Prime Minister Indira Gandhi ordered an attack on Sikh separatists belonging to the Khalistan movement who had holed up in the Golden Temple in Amritsar. The operation resulted in 500–1,500 civilian deaths and heavy damage to the Akal Takht.

==== Sri Lanka mission, 1987–1990 ====
The Indian Peace Keeping Force (IPKF) carried out a mission in northern and eastern Sri Lanka in 1987–1990 to disarm the Tamil Tigers per the Indo-Sri Lanka Accord. It was a difficult battle for the Indian Army, which was not trained for an unconventional war. After losing approximately 1,200 in personnel and several T-72 tanks, India ultimately abandoned the mission in consultation with Sri Lankan government. In what was labeled as Operation Pawan, the Indian Air Force flew about 70,000 sorties to and within Sri Lanka.

==== Operation Cactus, 1988 ====
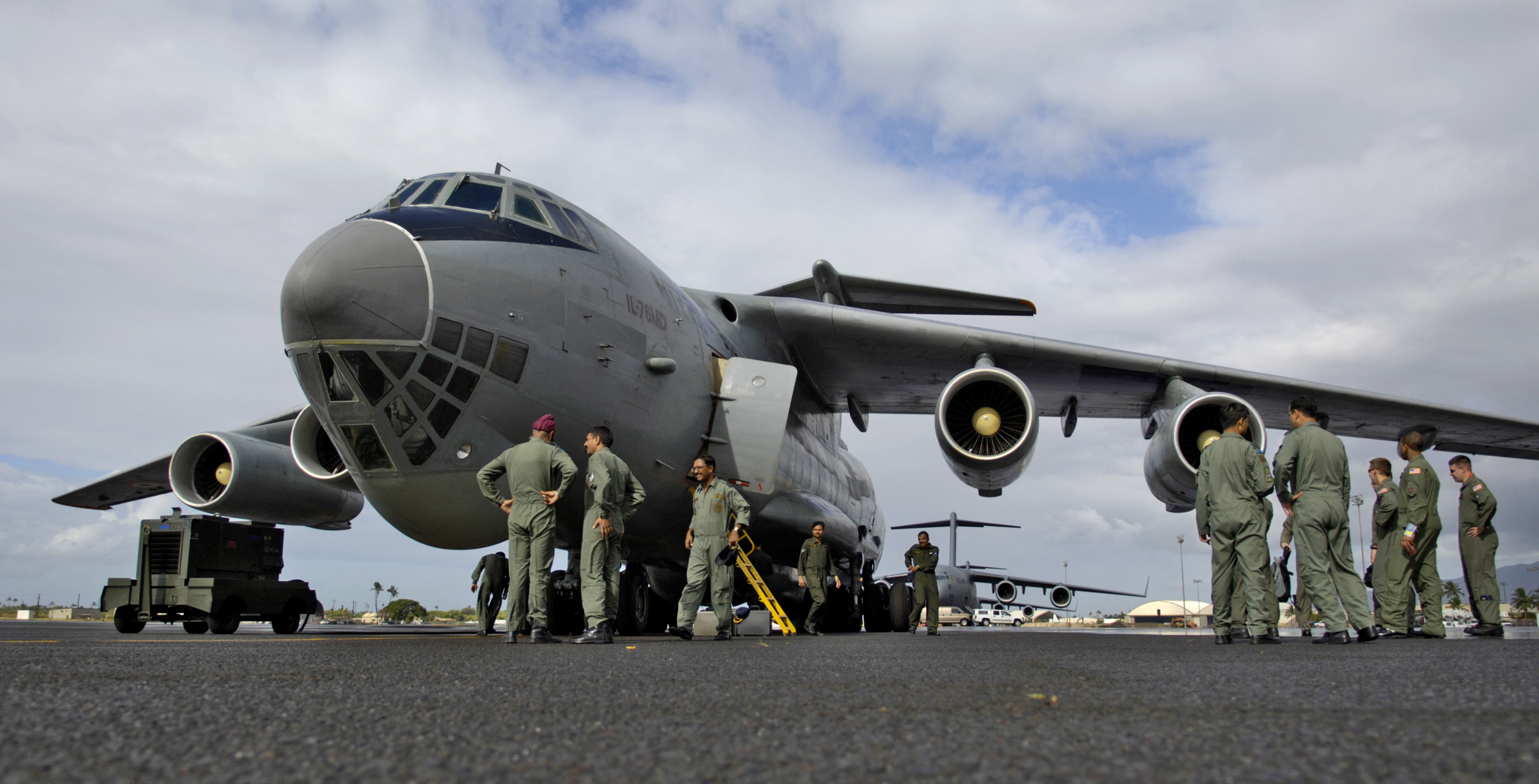
An Indian Air Force Ilyushin Il-76 transport aircraft of the model used to paradrop Indian troops in Malé.

In November 1988, the Maldives Government appealed India for military help against a mercenary invasion. On the night of 3 November, the Indian Air Force airlifted the Para Special forces from Agra and flew them non-stop over 2,000 km to Maldives. The paracommandos landed at Hulule, secured the airfield, and restored government rule at Malé within hours and without bloodshed.

=== 2001 Bangladesh–India border clashes ===
Also known as Bangladeshi-India border war, this brief clashes started on 15 April when Bangladeshis captured the disputed village of Pyrdiwah. The clashes lasted for about 5 days when the India and Bangladeshi forces took their original positions and the clashes ended in status quo ante bellum.

=== Missile program ===
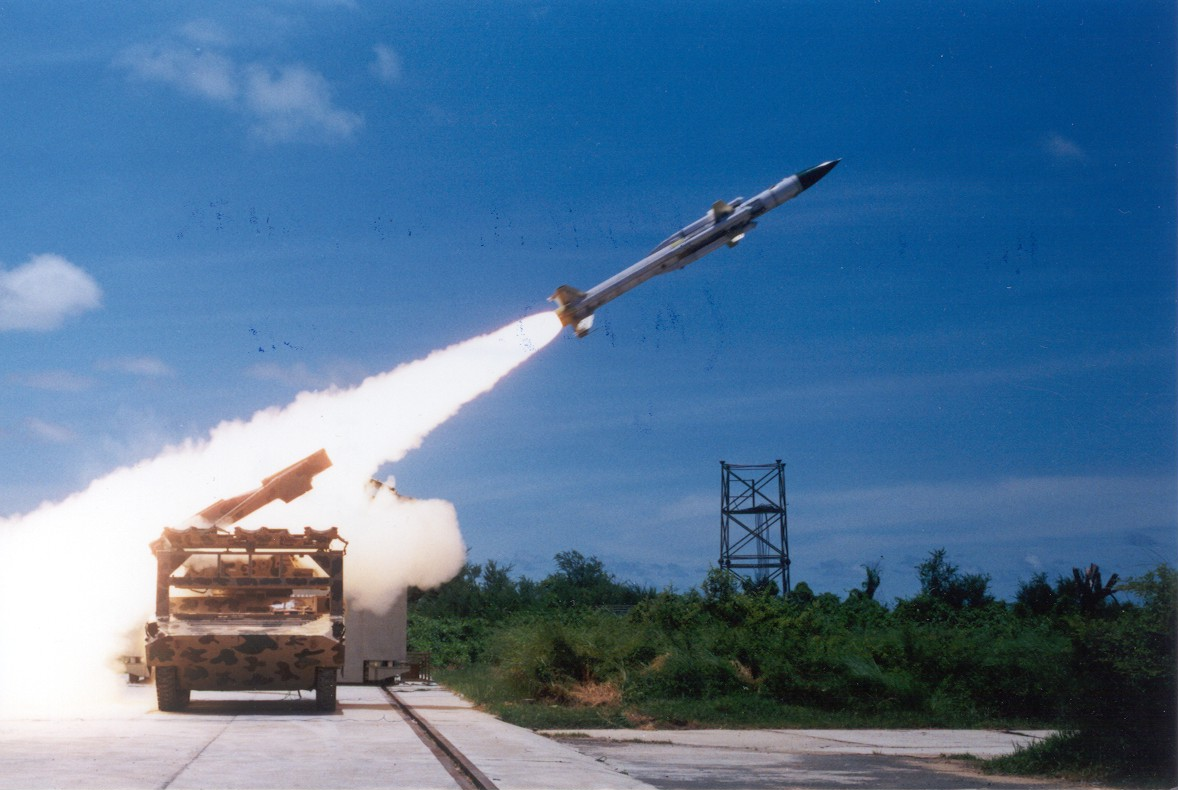
An Akash missile being test fired from the Integrated Test Range (ITR), Chandipur, Odisha.

India has well developed missile capabilities with roots in the Indian Space Program. The Integrated Guided Missile Development Program (IGMDP) was formed in 1983 with the aim of achieving self-sufficiency in missile development and production. Presently it comprises six core missile programs:

- Agni ballistic missile
- Prithvi ballistic missile
- Akash surface-to-air missile
- Trishul surface-to-air missile
- Nag anti-tank guided missile
- Nirbhay cruise missile

Currently the DRDO is developing Surya (missile), an advanced series of ICBM that the government reports would have a range of more than 10,000 km. This would put its range on par with advanced missiles in the United States, Russia, and Israel. India is the fourth country in the world to develop a successful missile defence shield, the Indian Ballistic Missile Defense Program.

=== Nuclear program ===
Shakti I: a thermonuclear device detonated on 11 May 1998 as part of the Pokhran-II tests. The nuclear yield was reported to be 45 kt.

In 1974, India tested a nuclear weapon with a yield of up to 15 kilotons. The test was codenamed Smiling Buddha. On 11 and 13 May 1998, India conducted a total of five underground nuclear tests and declared itself a nuclear state.

== Recent developments ==
The Indian military ranks second in terms of number of troops after China. The paramilitary unit of the Republic of India is the world's largest paramilitary force at over one million strong. Eager to portray itself as a potential superpower, India began an intense phase of upgrading its armed forces in the late 1990s. India focuses on developing indigenous military equipment rather than relying on other countries for supplies. Most of the Indian naval ships and submarines, military armoured vehicles, missiles, and ammunition are indigenously designed and manufactured.

=== Military collaborations with other countries ===
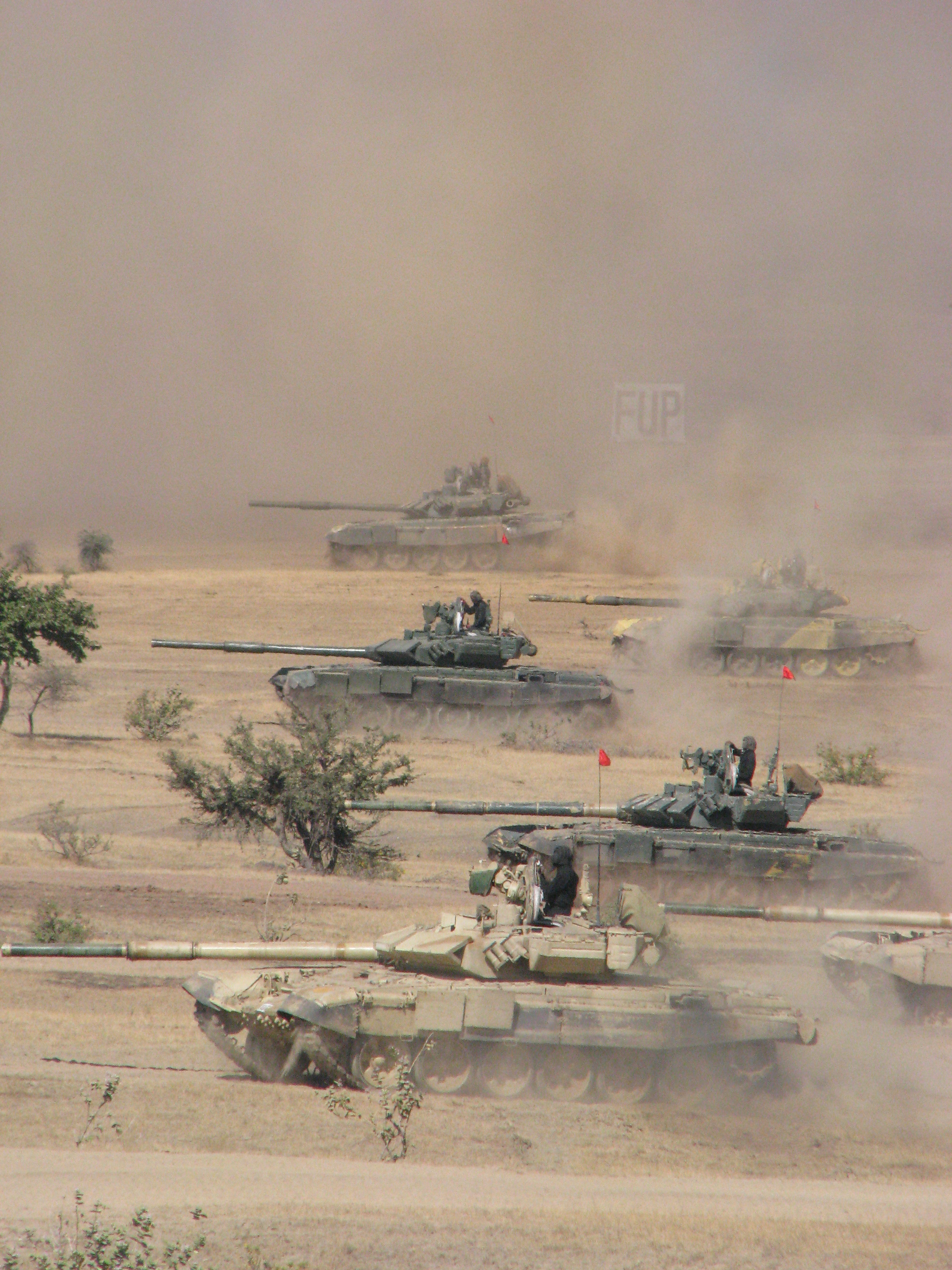
Indian T-90 Bhishma tanks during a training exercise in the Thar Desert, Rajasthan. Note the two different turret armour arrays.

In 1997, India agreed to participate in the development of Russia's "Prospective Air Complex for Tactical Air Forces" program. One of the primary objectives of the program was to develop a 5th generation fighter aircraft; the Su-47 prototype flew its first successful test flight in 1997. The BrahMos, a supersonic cruise missile jointly developed with Russia, was successfully test fired in 2001. India is also collaborating with Israel to develop Unmanned Aerial Vehicles.

India has focused recently on purchasing the technology behind military equipment rather than equipment itself. Recent examples include purchases of Sukhoi Su-30 MKI multi-role fighter aircraft and T-90 main battle tanks from Russia and diesel-powered Scorpene submarines from France. In 2004, India purchased US$5.7 billion worth of military equipment from other countries, making it the developing world's leading arms purchaser.

=== Disasters ===
On 28 April 2000, ammunition worth ₹3.93 billion (US$42 million) was destroyed in a fire at the Bharatpur ammunition depot. Another fire at the Pathankot sub-depot resulted in loss of ammo worth ₹280 million (US$3.0 million). On 24 May 2001, another blaze at the Birdhwal sub-depot destroyed ammunition worth ₹3.78 billion (US$40 million).

=== Awards ===
India's highest awards for military conduct in a time of war are, in descending order, the Param Vir Chakra, Maha Vir Chakra, and Vir Chakra. The peacetime equivalents are respectively the Ashoka Chakra, Kirti Chakra and Shaurya Chakra. The latter two awards were formerly known as Ashoka Chakra, Class II and Ashoka Chakra, Class III respectively. The peacetime awards have occasionally been bestowed on civilians. For meritorious service, the awards are the Param Vishisht Seva Medal, the Athi Vishisht Seva Medal, and the Vishisht Seva Medal.

== See also ==
- Indian Army Day
- History of India
- History of the Indian Navy
- Military history of India during World War II
- Military of India
- Ancient Hindu wars

== Sources ==
- Grainger, John D. (2014), Seleukos Nikator: Constructing a Hellenistic Kingdom, Routledge, ISBN 978-1-317-80099-6
- Kosmin, Paul J. (2014), The Land of the Elephant Kings: Space, Territory, and Ideology in Seleucid Empire, Harvard University Press, ISBN 978-0-674-72882-0
- Mookerji, Radha Kumud (1988) [first published in 1966], Chandragupta Maurya and his times (4th ed.), Motilal Banarsidass, ISBN 81-208-0433-3
- Rehman, Abdur (January 1976). The Last Two Dynasties of the Sahis: An analysis of their history, archaeology, coinage and palaeography (Thesis). Australian National University.
- Trautmann, Thomas (2015), Elephants and Kings: An Environmental History, University of Chicago Press, ISBN 978-0-226-26453-0
- Wheatley, Pat; Heckel, Waldemar (2011), ""Commentary (Book 15)"", Justin: Epitome of the Philippic History of Pompeius Trogus: Volume II, Oxford University Press, ISBN 978-0-19-927759-9
