= List of early Hindu–Muslim military conflicts in the Indian subcontinent =

The table below lists the early Hindu-Muslim military conflicts in the Indian subcontinent.

(Color legend for victory in the conflicts)

Muslim	Hindu	Inconclusive

Year	Aggressor	Location	Commander	Result
637	Muslim	Tanah, near Mumbai	Caliph Umar	Naval raid failure
c. 643	Muslim	Debal	Caliph Umar	Naval raid failure
c. 643	Muslim	Broach	Caliph Umar	Naval raid failure
c. 650	Muslim	Sistan		The Arabs initially succeeded but ultimately lost everything after return
650	Muslim	Zaranj	Caliph Uthman	City of Zabul occupied by Muslims
660s	Muslim	Bust	Ibn Samarah	Bust occupied; Kabul garrisoned
660s	Muslim	Kabul	Abd al-Rahman ibn Samura	Abd al-Rahman seized Kabul and triumphed in Zabulistan.
670s	Hindu	Kabul	unknown	Hindus recapture Kabul
680	Hindu	Kabul	Ratbil, Yazid ibn Ziyad	Hindu raiding parties harass Muslims
683	Hindu	Junzah		Hindus defeated the Muslims at Junzah, killing the governor and nobles.
685	Hindu			The king of Zabul was killed and his army defeated in 685. His son signed a treaty
692	Muslim	Bust	Abu Dulhah, Ratbil	Bust retaken by Muslim expedition
694	Muslim	Kabul	Ibn Abi-Makrah, Ratbil	Major Muslim siege fails to retake Kabul
695	Muslim	Kabul	Al-Hajjaj; Ubaidullah	The kings of Zabul and Kabul defeated the Muslims, causing many deaths, including Ubaiduliah from grief.
699	Muslim	Zabul	Al-Hajjaj; Abd-ar-Rahman	Abd-ar-Rahman defeated the king of Zabul and ravaged the land.
711	Muslim	Debal	Ubaidullah, Dahir of Aror (Brahmin dynasty)	Ubaidullah killed by Dahir expedition failed
712	Muslim	Debal	Budail, Jaisiah (Hullishah) (Brahmin dynasty)	Budail was killed and many Arabs taken prisoners raja Dahir was the king at that time
713	Muslim	Multan	Muhammad ibn Qasim	Islamic conquest of urban Sindh completed
715	Hindu	Alor	Jaisiah (Hullishah) (Brahmin dynasty), al-Muhallab	Hindu army retakes major city from Muslims.
715	Hindu	Mehran	Jaisiah (Hullishah) (Brahmin dynasty), al-Muhallab	Muslims stall the Hindu counter-offensive
718	Hindu	Brahmanabad	Jaisiah (Hullishah) (Brahmin dynasty), al-Muhallab	Hindu attacks resume
721	Muslim	Brahmanabad	al-Muhallab, Hullishah	Hullishah becomes a Muslim, likely due to military reversals.
725	Muslim	Avanti	Nagabhata I (Pratihara)	Defeat of large expedition against Avanti.
723-726	Muslim	Uzain, Mirmad, Dahnaj, others	Junayd of Sindh	Raiding India as part of Umayyad Hindu policy.
723-726	Muslim	al-Bailaman, al-Jurz	Junayd	Annexed by Muslims.
723-726	Muslim	Vallabhi	Junayd of Sindh, Nagabhata I (Pratihara)	Pratihara capital sacked in Muslim raid.
between 720–730	Muslim	towards Central India	Junayd, Yashovarman, Lalitaditya Muktapida	Lalitaditya's and Yashovarman's strategic alliance repelled and defeated the Muslims.
740	Muslim	Chittor	Mauray of Chittor	Hindus repulse an Arab siege
754-775	Muslim	ar-Rukhraj, Kabul, Kandahar, Kashmir	Caliph Al-Mansur	Heavy raids and sieges but few annexations by Muslims
778	Muslims	Barabad	Caliph Al-Mahdi	Muslim amphibious assault annihilated.
Late 770s	Muslim	Sijistan	Caliph Al-Mahdi	Raja of Sijistan made vassal of Caliphate.
780-787	Muslim	Fort Tharra, Bagar, Bhaqmbur	Haji Abu Turab	Vigorous Muslim offensive captures several important Hindu outposts.
786-791	Muslim	Kabul	Caliph ar-Rashid	Major Muslim siege effort fails.
800-810	Hindu	Sindh border	Nagabhata II (Pratihara), Caliph Al-Amin	Several Muslim outposts fall to Pratihara incursions
810-820	Muslim	Kabul	Caliph Al-Ma'mun, Nagabhata II (Pratihara)	Kabul falls to Muslims, is then retaken by Hindus.
820-830	Muslim	Fort Sindan	al-Fadl ibn Mahan	Sindan captured, but Hindu riots make pacification of Sindh impossible.
839	Hindu	Fort Sindan	Mihira Bhoja(Pratihara)	Hindus expel Muslim garrison.
845	Hindu	Yavana	Dharmpala	Muslim principality becomes vassal of Pratiharas.
845-860	Hindu	Pratihara-Sindh	Mihira Bhoja (Pratihara)	Uneasy truce between Sindh and Rajputana.
860	Hindu	Rajputana-Sindh	Kokalla I (Kalachuri)	Kalachuri raids into Sindh to finance war with Pratihara kingdom
867	Muslim	Herat	Yakub ibn Layth	Saffarid conquest
870	Muslim	Kabul	Yakub ibn Layth, Lalliya Shahi	Saffarid conquest
880-900	Muslim	Sijistan	Amr ibn Layth, Kamaluka Shahi	Frequent raids by Muslims.
903-905	Hindu	Kabul region	Shahi dynasty	Disintegration of Saffarids allows major Hindu military achievements.
905-915	Hindu	Multan region	Mahipala Pratihara	Series of major but unsuccessful Hindu sieges of Multan.
940-950	Hindu	Multan region	Pratihara, Amir of Multan	Evidences of war and reprisals prior to the Qarmatian take-over.
c. 948-963	Muslim	Alptigin	Punjab	Alptigin of Ghazni plunders Punjab several times.
963	Muslim	Alptigin, Anuk Lawik	Fort Ghazni	Muslims take fort from Hindus.
965-973	Muslim	Lamghan	Sabuktigin	Heavy raiding
973	Hindu	Ghazna	Sabuktigin	Defeat of Hindu expedition.
973-991	Muslim	Lamghan	Sabuktigin, Jayapala (Hindu Shahi)	Long series of engagements, eventual Muslim annexation of Lamghan

== See also ==
- Ghaznavid campaigns in India
- Ghurid campaigns in India
- List of wars involving the Delhi Sultanate
- List of wars involving the Mughal Empire

== Bibliography ==
- Majumdar, R. C., ed. (1962) [1954]. The History and Culture of the Indian People - 3 The Classical Age (Second ed.). Bombay: Bharatiya Vidya Bhavan.
