= Tripartite Struggle =

785–816 conflict in India

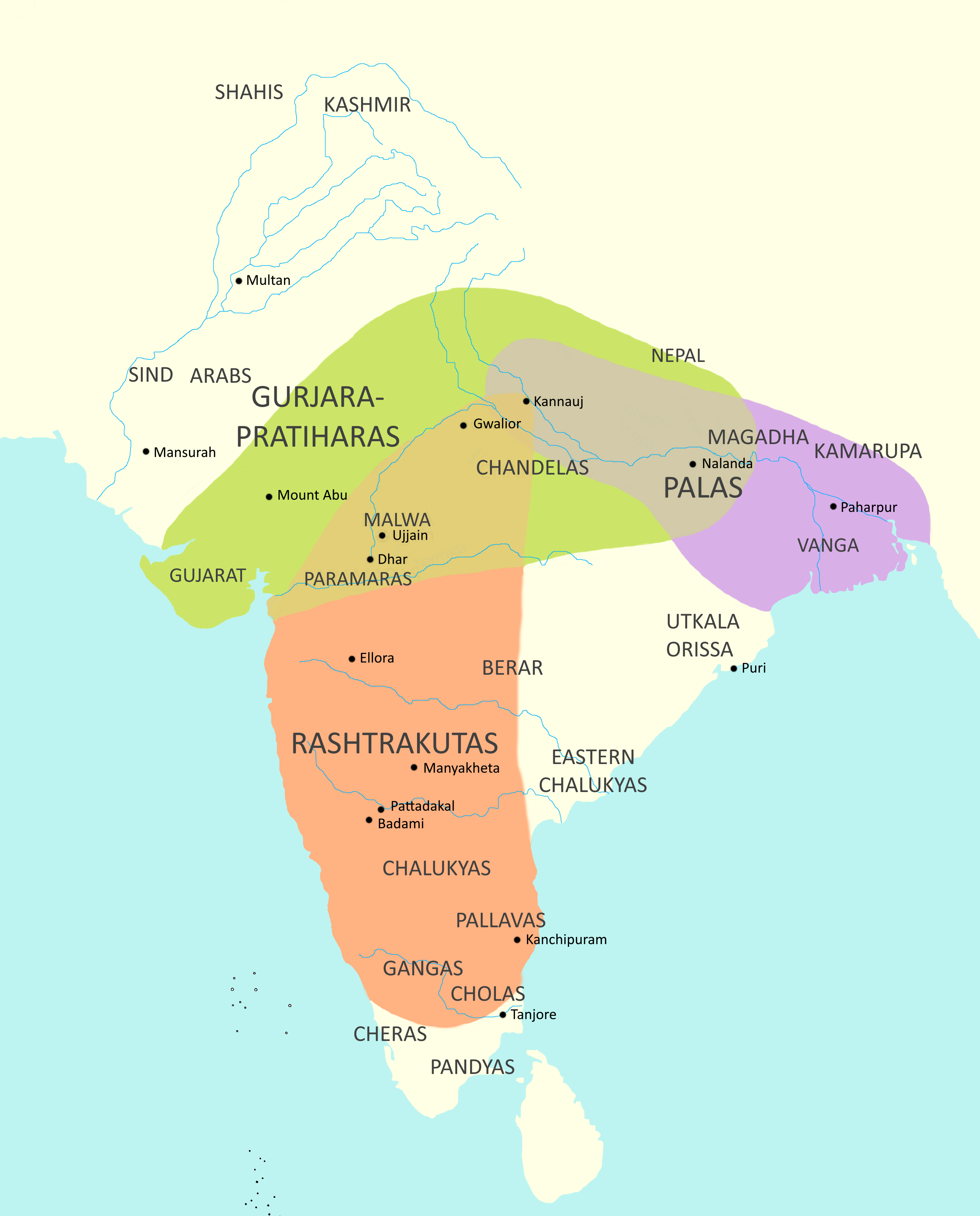
- The Pratihara dynasty, the Pala Empire, and the Rashtrakuta Empire at their respective peaks during the Tripartite Struggle.
Date	785–816
Location	Kannauj, Malwa and Gauda
Result	Pratihara victory

Belligerents
Pratihara dynasty: Kingdom of Sambhar; Pratiharas of Mandore; Chalukyas of Saurashtra; Guhilas of Chatsu	Rashtrakuta Empire	Pala Empire: Ayudhas of Kannauj (from 791)

Commanders and leaders
Vatsaraja; Durlabharaja I; Nagabhata II; Kakka; Vahukadhavala; Sankaragana	Dhruva; Govinda III	Dharmapala; Chakrayudha

The Tripartite Struggle (785–816) also known as the Kannauj Wars, were a series of wars in northern India fought over the control of the throne of Kannauj. It involved the three powerful dynasties of the era– the Gurjara-Pratiharas, the Palas of Gauda (Bengal) and the Rashtrakutas of Manyakheta. The war ultimately resulted in Nagabhata II, winning the crown of Kannauj in 816, and proclaiming himself as King of Kannauj.

In the eighth century, the two major powers of Aryavarta (northern India) were the Pratiharas who ruled the Gurjaratra Kingdom and the Palas who ruled the Kingdom of Gauda (Bengal). While the Pratiharas gradually expanded their domain towards the east, the Palas expanded their domains towards the west. In southern India and the Deccan, the Rashtrakutas of Manyakheta reigned, who also sought to expand their domains north and control Aryavarta. This led to the formation of the Kannauj triangle, a region which lead to decades of conflict.

== Background ==
According to the Epigraphist Dineschandra Sircar, the struggle between the Pratihara and the Rashtrakuta had begun earlier than the struggle over the Kingdom of Kannauj. These two powers shared a common frontier in the Gujarat and Malwa regions. The frontier was a shifting one and far from permanent, causing enmity between the two powers. Even before the struggle over Kannauj started, Dantidurga, the founder of the Rashtrakuta Empire, had defeated Nagabhata I of the Pratihara dynasty, as evident from the Dashavatara Temple inscription of Dantidurga at Ellora and the Sanjan inscription of Amoghavarsha I, both belonging to the Rashtrakuta dynasty which states that Dantidurga (r. 735–756) performed a religious ceremony at Ujjayani, and the king of Gurjara-desha (Gurjara country) acted as his door-keeper (pratihara), suggesting that the Rashtrakuta king had subdued the Pratihara king who was ruling Avanti at that time.

On the other hand, the conflict between the Palas of Gauda/Bengal and the Ayudhas of Kannauj was the continuation of an old power struggle that had started between Harshavardhana of Kannauj and Sasanka of Gauda in the 7th century and would continue till the 12th century. These regional struggles were escalated to a greater pitch over the issue of succession of the Ayudha dynasty. Also, the involvement of the four powers, i.e. the Pratihara Empire, the Pala Empire, the Rashtrakuta Empire, and the Kingdom of Kannauj meant that it was actually a four-power struggle.

== Prelude ==
By the eighth century, the Pushyabhuti dynasty which had controlled much of northern India under Harshavardhana in the seventh century had greatly diminished in power under a succession of weak kings, and was replaced by two new great powers in North India — the Kingdom of Gurjara to the west and the Kingdom of Bengal to the east. In southern India, the Rashtrakuta royal family reigned, whose king Dhruva too had imperial ambitions to rule northern India.

The king of the Gurjaras, Vatsaraja, the grand-nephew of Nagabhata I, expanded the small principality founded by his ancestor into a powerful kingdom in northwestern India. His ambitions matched those of Dharmapala, the king of Bengal who too wanted glory for himself and wanted to extend his power beyond his ancestral domain in eastern India. The throne of Kannauj was equivalent to having imperial status over all of northern India and thus, Vatsaraja, Dharmapala, and Dhruva, all sought to control it. The incumbents of the Kannauj throne at that time, the Ayudha dynasty were weak rulers and the accession of Indrayudha triggered the first great war.

== First Tripartite War (AD 785–790) ==
The first move was made by Vatsaraja (of the Pratihara dynasty), soon after the ascension of the new king of Kannauj, Indrayudha. He swiftly invaded Kannauj and defeated the king. The weak king accepted the overlordship of Vatsaraja.

Following this success, Vatsaraja proceeded to invade Bengal. His vassal, Durlabharaja I, the king of Sambhar pursued the forces of the king of Gauda and defeated Dharmapala. His men looted the royal treasury, and Vatsaraja set back on his way to his kingdom. Vatsaraja adopted the title Ranahastin following this victory.

However, the ambitious king of the South, Dhruva (of the Rashtrakuta dynasty) decided to intervene in the ongoing conflict of the northern kingdoms. While Vatsaraja was on his return journey with the spoils of war, he was defeated by Dhruva's forces, and was thus forced to flee and hide in the deserts of Maru. Following this, Dhruva met and defeated Dharmapala in the Doab. Dhruva however, had no intentions for any permanent territorial conquests and only intended to raid the invaded regions. He thus returned to the South in 790.

== Dharmapala's invasion of Kannauj (AD 791) ==
Following the departure of Dhruva, Dharmapala grabbed the opportunity and invading the kingdom of Kannauj around 791, (Note: Sometime between 790 and 793 is most plausible. Bhatia estimates that the event happened around 791.) defeated Indrayudha and installed his brother Chakrayudha as his vassal, clearly avoiding annexation. He then held an imperial court at Kannauj to crown Chakrayudha, which was attended by the rulers of Bhoja, (Note: possibly Vidarbha) Matsya, (Note: Jaipur and north-east Rajasthan) Madra, (Note: east Punjab) Kuru, (Note: Haryana-Delhi-Western UP region) Yadu, (Note: possibly Mathura, Dwarka or Siṁhapura in the Punjab) Yavana, Avanti, Gandhara and Kira. (Note: Kangra Valley) These kings accepted the installation of Chakrayudha on the Kannauj throne, while "bowing down respectfully with their diadems trembling". Some historians have speculated that all these kingdoms might have been the vassal states of the Pala empire but maintained their autonomy.

== Govinda III's northern campaign (AD 798–800) ==
Vatsaraja was succeeded by his son Nagabhata II (r. 795–833), who strived to rebuild the fallen empire of his father. In the Deccan, Dhruva was succeeded by his son Govinda III (r. 793–814). Wary of the rising might of Nagabhata, he decided to crush Nagabhata's power before he became too powerful. After securing the Vindhya passes under his loyal brother Indra, he invaded the Gurjara kingdom though Bhopal and Jhansi and defeated Nagabhata near Gwalior. Govinda conquered Malwa, Lata and Mahakoshal from the Gurjaras.

Chakrayudha made an unconditional surrender to Govinda, and thus, Govinda made no effort to conquer the Doab. Dharmapala also submitted.

== Gurjara–Gauda War (AD 816) ==
With Govinda's death in 814, the Rashtrakuta threat finally lapsed. Nagabhata was careful not to waste any time at all. In 816, Nagabhata II invaded the Doab, and defeated king Chakrayudha and proclaimed himself the King of Kannauj, establishing Kannauj as the Pratiharan capital, and marking the end of Ayudha control over the throne of Kannauj. Dharmapala prepared for the inevitable and Nagabhata, along with his vassals — Kakka of the Jodhpur Pratihara family, Vahukadhavala, the Chalukya chief of southern Kathiawar and the Guhilot Sankaragana, began the final invasion of Bengal. In the Battle of Monghyr, Nagabhata's forces soundly defeated those of Dharmapala, finally resulting in a Pratiharan victory, and marking the end of the decades-long tripartite struggle. Nagabhata also assumed the title Paramabhattaraka (All-Powerful) after his victory.
