= Ranahastin =

Indian royal title

- Ranahastin
- Title of Emperor Vatsaraja: c. 8th century CE
- Dynasty: Gurjara-Pratihara

Ranahastin or Ratnahastin (also transliterated as Ratnabastin and Rahnahastin) was one of the titles of Pratihara emperor Vatsaraja along with Maharajadhiraja, and Parmeshwara.

According to the Gwalior Prashasti Inscription of his descendant Mihira Bhoja, the title Ranahastin is found on several coins of Vatsaraja after he conquered Kanauj from Bhandi Clan Bhandi was also the clan of the maternal family of King Harsha Vardhana of Kanauj and Vatsaraja reduced Indrayudha of Kanauj to the status of feudatory after his conquest of Kanuaj and beginning of Tripartite struggle.

The coins bearing the titles were found in several parts of the Kannauj Gangetic valley, Gurjaratra and the Saurashtra region of Gujarat. According to Alexander Cunningham the coin discovered in Gurjaratra weighs around 6.5 grains. The obverse of the coin has a Royal elephant facing right with its trunk hanging down, with legend Sri Rana Hasti arranged in two lines. Rana Hasti also means elephant king.

It is speculated that, title may have been used by several kings and chiefs. The title is known to have been used by unknown 10-11th century ruler of the Solanki Rajputs feudatory in Gujarat or Rajasthan.
