= Chalukyas of Saurashtra =

Chalukya dynasty in Saurashtra (8th–10th-century)

The Chalukyas of Saurashtra ruled the southern Kathiawar peninsula in western India as Gurjara vassals, from the city of Una (in modern-day Junagadh). They ruled from the eighth century until the middle of the tenth century when their territory was conquered by the Abhiras.

They used the title Mahipati.

== History ==
=== Sources ===
Only two copper plate inscriptions exist as the sources for the dynasty, both in Una.

=== Early history ===
The first king of the dynasty was Kalla who ruled during the late eighth century. He was succeeded by his brother, Mahalla. Mahalla was succeeded by Kalla's son. (Note: The name of this Kalla's son cannot be deciphered from the inscription.) Mahalla was succeeded by Vahukadhavala.

=== Vahukadhavala ===
Vahukadhavala ruled in the first quarter of the ninth century. He came under the overlordship of Nagabhata II who conquered Saurashtra about this period. Vahukadhavala defeated Dharma (Dharmapala, king of Bengal) and the Karnata army (Rashtrakutas).

Vahukadhavala was succeeded by his son Avanivarman I.

=== Balavarman ===
Avanivarman I was succeeded by his son Mahasamanta Balavarman. Balavarman was ruling under the suzerainty of Mahendrapala I about 893 AD. He defeated Jajappa of Hunamandala (northwest of Malwa).

=== Avanivarman II ===
Balavarman was succeeded by his son Avanivarman II. Avanivarman ruled under Mahendrapala I and later warred against and defeated Dharanivaraha, the Chapa king of Vardhamanapura, a vassal of Mahipala I, the successor of Mahendrapala I. This showed that the empire had been declining and the emperor had lost control over the outlying provinces.

Avanivarman was defeated by the King of Malwa, Siyaka II. The Chaulukyas of Saurashtra came to an end with their defeat at the hands of Abhira Ruler Graharipu.

== List of rulers ==
This is the list of the Chalukya chiefs of Saurashtra known from their inscriptions.

- Kalla
- Mahalla
- Unknown (Kalla' son)
- Vahukadhavala
- Avanivarman I
- Balavarman
- Avanivarman II
