= Nagabhata =

Nagabhata may refer to either of two kings in India in the 8th and 9th centuries:

- Nagabhata I - c 750–?, founder of the Gurjara-Pratihara dynasty
- Nagabhata II - c 815–c 833, king of the Gurjara-Pratihara dynasty

== See also ==
- Naga (disambiguation)
- Bhat
