= Indo-Sasanian coinage =

Indo-Sasanian coinage
(530–1202 CE)

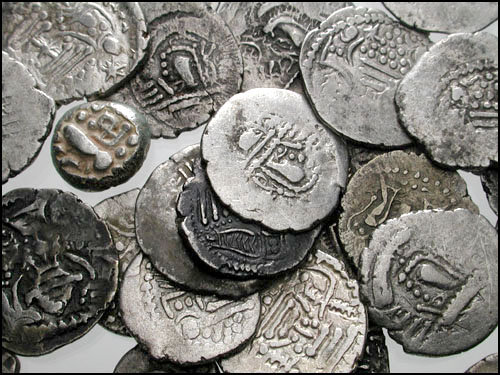
Indo-Sasanians coins, with similar types of Sasanian-style bust on the obverse and crude fire altar on the reverse. These are mainly Gurjara types, circa 6th-7th century, with a few later Chavada and Chaulukya types.

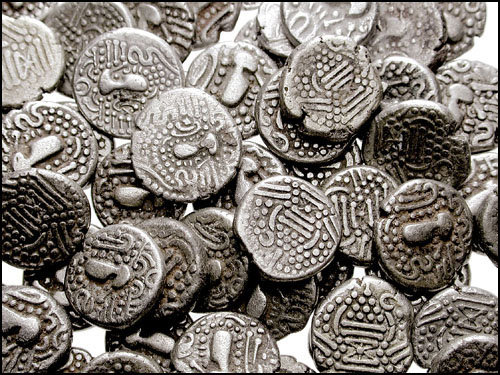
Indo-Sasanian coinage of the Chaulukyas ("Gadhaiya Paise"). 9th–10th century.

Indo-Sasanian coinage was major type of coinage of the post-Gupta Empire period, in the areas of Gujarat and Rajasthan in western India and in the Gangetic region, from the 6th century to the 12th century CE. These coins were derived from the Sasanian coinage design, probably transmitted to the subcontinent by the Alchon Huns as they invaded northern India circa 500 CE. They are an important component of Indian coinage.

== Design and extent ==
Indo-Sasanian coins derive from three Sasanian prototypes, which were introduced in western India by the Alchon Huns, also called Hunas by the Indians.

=== Western and northwestern regions ===
Indo-Sasanian coinage covers a period of several centuries, during which it is possible to see a progressive degradation and stylisation of the original Sasanian design, in ways which vary according to the region where they were current. Typically, the bust of the king on the obverse is highly simplified and geometric, and the design of the fire altar, with or without the two attendants, appears as a geometrical motif on the reverse of this type of coinage.

This coinage was current among the various polities of Western India succeeding the collapse of the Gupta Empire, such as the Rashtrakuta, Chaulukya and Palas from circa 530 CE to 1202 CE. In the case of the Chaulukyas, these are also often called "Gadhaiya Paise".

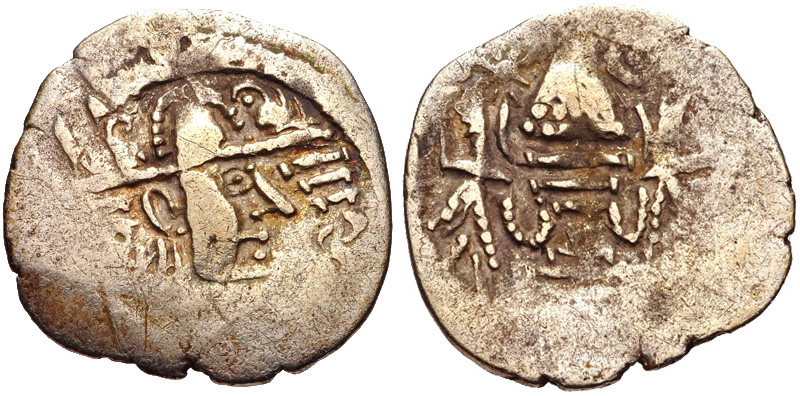
Coin of the Gurjara Confederacy, on the model of the Sasanian coinage of Sindh. Sindh. Circa 570-712 CE

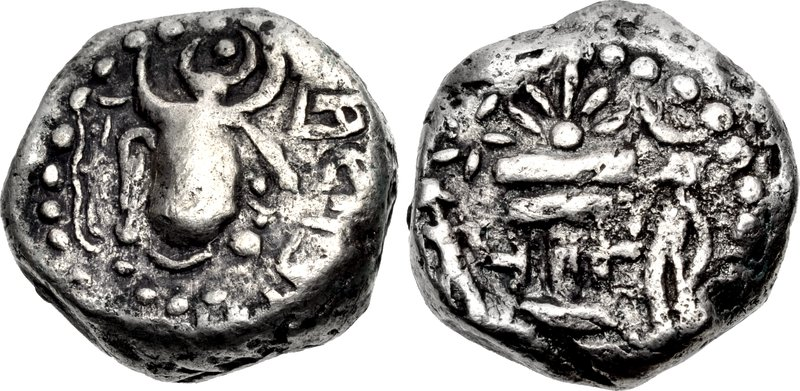
Indo-Sasanian, Sindh. Uncertain king. Mid 7th-early 8th century.

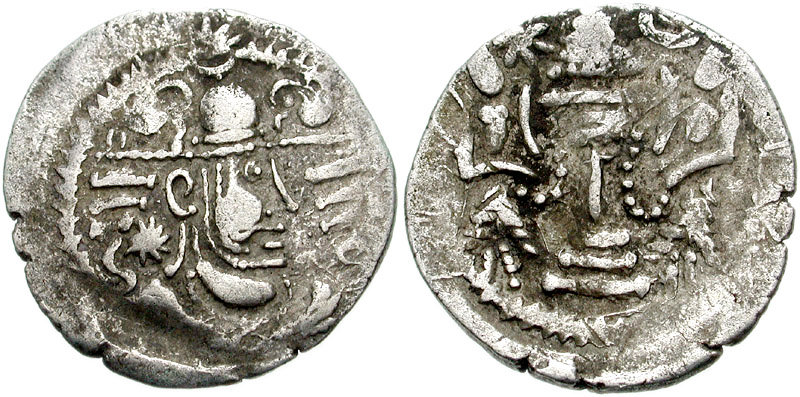
Indo-Sasanian coin, Rajputana. Imitating Peroz I. Circa 10th century.

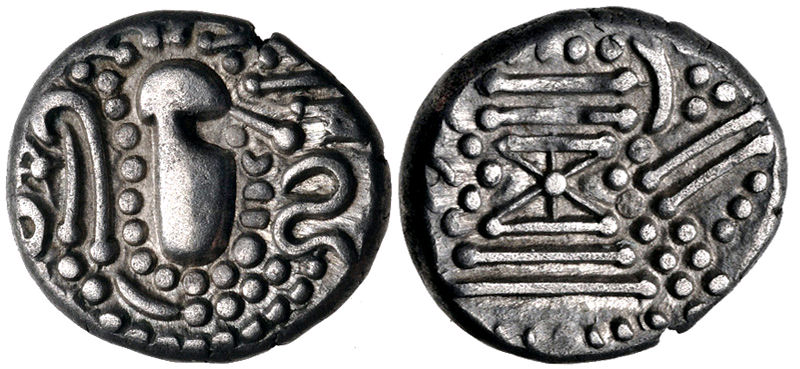
A Chaulukya-Paramara coin, circa 950-1050 CE. Stylized rendition of Chavda dynasty coins: Indo-Sassanian style bust right; pellets and ornaments around / Stylised fire altar; pellets around.

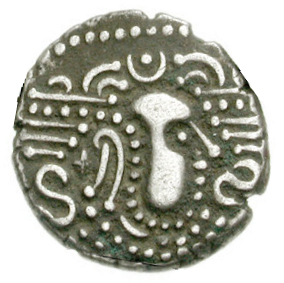
Indo-Sasanian coin of the Chaulukyas with geometrical royal effigy, circa 10th century CE

=== Gangetic region ===
Around the beginning of the 9th century, coin designs derived from the Sasanians were adopted in the Gangetic region: the Vigrahapala drammas of a certain ruler named Vigrahapala, and later the Adivaraha drammas of the Gurjara-Pratihara ruler Bhoja I (c. 836–886 CE).

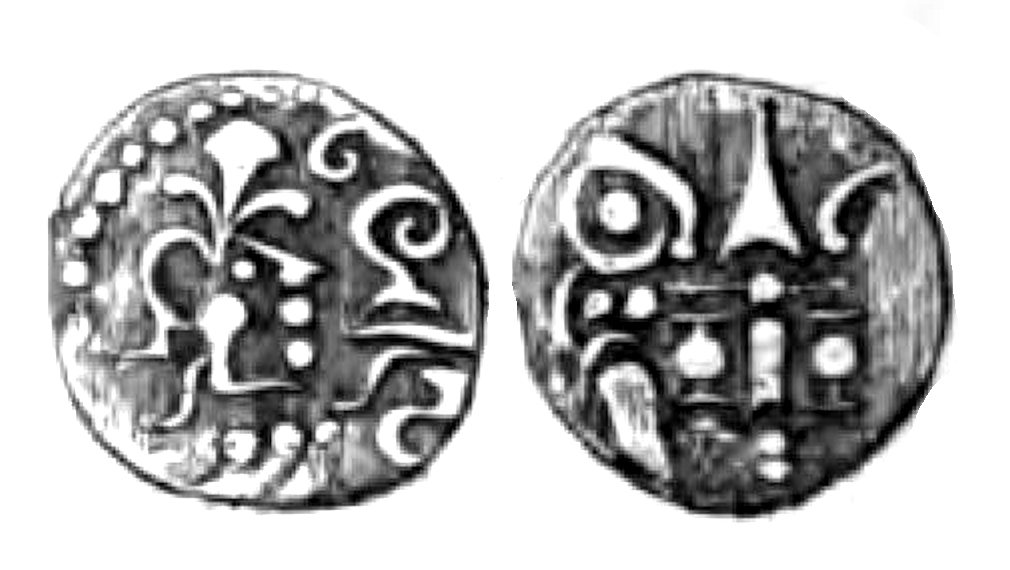
Vigrahapala Dramma (drawing): the profile of the ruler and the altar with attendants appear in a stylized manner. 9th century CE.

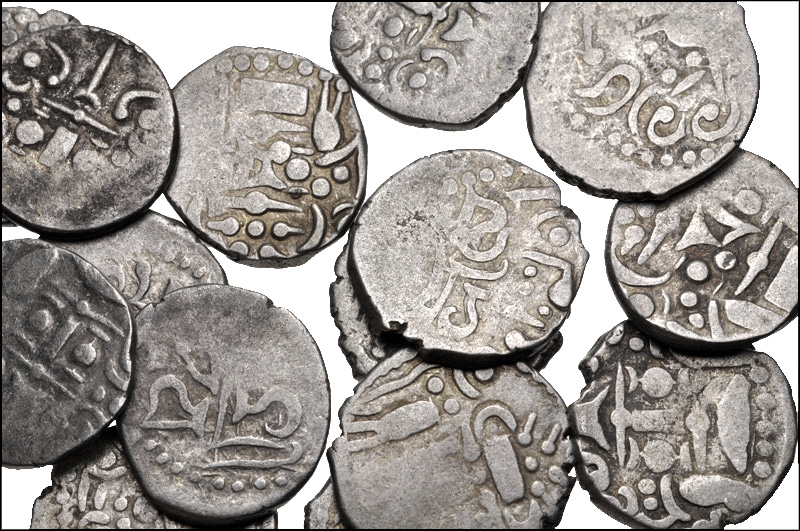
Vigrahapala Drammas, 9th century CE.

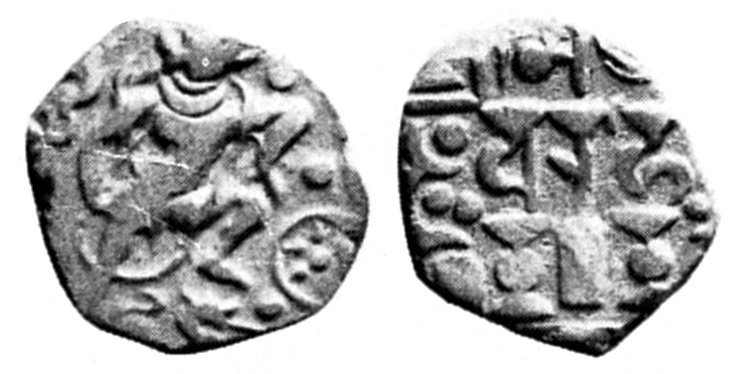
Adivaraha drammas: Gurjara-Pratihara coinage of Mihira Bhoja, King of Kanauj, 850–900 CE. Obv: Boar, incarnation of Vishnu, and solar symbol. Rev: "Traces of Sasanian type". Legend: Srímad Ādi Varāha "The fortunate primaeval boar".

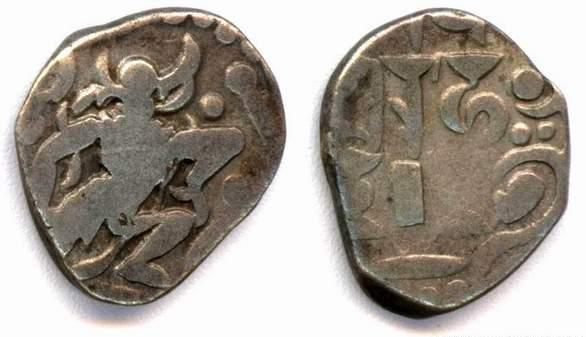
Adivaraha Dramma coin, circa 836–885 CE

== See also ==
- Arab–Sasanian coinage
- Sasanian coinage of Sindh
