= Devaraja (Pratihara dynasty) =

Pratihara king
- Reign: Second half of the 8th century
- Predecessor: Kakustha
- Successor: Vatsaraja
- Dynasty: Pratihara dynasty

Devarāja (8th century CE) was a king from the Pratihara dynasty of northern India. In the Barah inscription of his descendant Mihira Bhoja, Devaraja's name appears as Devashakti (IAST: Devaśakti).

According to the Gwalior prashasti inscription of Mihira Bhoja, Devaraja was the younger son of an unnamed brother of the dynasty's founder Nagabhata I. He succeeded his elder brother Kakustha on the throne. Nagabhata probably died around 760 CE, and the earliest known date of Devaraja's successor Vatsaraja is 783 CE. Thus, Kakustha and Devaraja ruled between c. 760 CE and 780 CE.

The Gwalior inscription states that Devaraja subdued several kings, and destroyed their powerful allies. This praise is an exaggeration, but it appears that made some attempts to extend his kingdom in the south-west. It also suggests that he was able to maintain the territories he inherited.

Devaraja was a devotee of Vishnu. He was married to Bhuyika-devi, and was succeeded by his son Vatsaraja.
