= Kakustha =

Kakustha may refer to:

- Kakutstha, a legendary king of India
- Kakustha (Gurjara-Pratihara dynasty), an 8th-century Indian king

== See also ==
- Kakusthavarma, a 5th-century Indian king from the Kadamba dynasty
