= Ramabhadra =

Pratihara emperor from 833 to 836

5th Pratihara emperor
- Reign: c. 833 – c. 836
- Predecessor: Nagabhata II
- Successor: Mihira Bhoja
- Died: 836
- Mother: Istadevi

Ramabhadra (died 836), also known as Rama and Ramadeva, was the emperor of the Pratihara dynasty from 833 to 836. According to the Jain text Prabhavakacarita, Nagabhata II was succeeded by Ramabhadra. His mother's name was Istadevi. Ramabhadra had a brief reign of three years. He encountered many difficulties during his reign. From an inscription found at Gwalior, it is known that his empire extended to Gwalior.
