= Yasahpala of Kannauj =

King of Kannauj from 1024 to 1036

Yasahpala

King of Kannauj
- Reign: 1024–1036
- Predecessor: Trilochanapala (1018–1027)
- Successor: Kingdom abolished
- Dynasty: Pratihara

Yasahpala or Jasapala was the last king of Kannauj and the last member of the Imperial Pratihara dynasty, who ruled from 1024 till 1036 CE. He succeeded his father, Trilochanapala (1018–1027). The Pratihara authority had shrunk considerably only to the city of Kannauj and the surrounding region.

Preceded by Trilochanapala (1018–1027)	Gurjara-Pratihara king (1204 CE-1036 CE)	Succeeded by last king of his dynasty, dynasty abolished after his death
