= Kuvalaya-mālā =

779 Prakrit language novel

- Author: Uddyotana-sūri
- Original title: कुवलयमाला
- Translator: Hampa Nagarajaiah, Christine Chojnacki (French), Alexander Reynolds (English)
- Language: Prakrit, Apabhramsha
- Subject: Story of five souls (jivas) going through several rebirths on their way to liberation
- Genre: fiction
- Publication date: 21 March 779 CE
- Publication place: Gurjara-Pratihara kingdom

Kuvalaya-mālā ("Garland of Blue Water Lilies") is a 779 CE Prakrit-language novel written by the Jain monk Uddyotana-sūri in Jabalipura of Gurjara-Pratihara kingdom (present-day Jalore, India). It is written in the champu (mixed verse and prose) form, and features dialogues in several other languages, including Sanskrit, Apabhramsha, and Paishachi.

The novel narrates the story of five souls (including that of princess Kuvalaya-mālā) as they go through several rebirths. Initially, each of the five souls is misguided by one of the five passions: anger, vanity, deceit, greed, and infatuation. Ultimately, the five souls meet the Jain leader Mahavira in their final birth, and achieve liberation. The text uses this narrative to explain the Jain philosophy and practices.

== Authorship and date ==
Uddyotana-sūri, also known as Udyota-sūri or Dakshinyachihna, composed Kuvalaya-mālā at Jabalipura (modern Jalore). An analysis of the work suggests that he completed it on 21 March 779 CE. The work was composed during the reign of the Gurjara-Pratihara king Vatsaraja alias Ranahastin.

Kuvalaya-mālā is a didactic tale with a moral fervour: Uddyotana-sūri's teacher Hari-bhadra (fl. 750 CE) also wrote a didactic tale titled Samaraichcha-kaha. Siddharshi (fl. 906 CE), another monk in this lineage, wrote a didactic tale titled Upamiti-bhava-prapancha. Both Uddyotana-sūri and Siddharshi were inspired by Haribhadra's work.

== Language ==
The author identifies the primary language of the text as Prakrit, and states that it follows the "Maharashtra-deshi" patterns. The text features quotations in other languages, including Sanskrit, Apabhramsha, and Paishachi.

The author recognises three literary languages: Prakrit, Sanskrit, and Apabhramsha, and the text features bards reciting in these languages in the court of king Drdha-varman. Besides the literary Prakrit (Maharashtri and Shauraseni), the text features other dialects including Magadhi, Rakshasi (Chulika-Paishachi), Paishachi, Apabhramsha, and a mixture of these.

The author also provides specimens of vernaculars (desha-bhasha or deshi-bhasha) spoken by traders from different regions. The author intends to name 18 of these regional groups, although the surviving text names only 16: Gollas, those from Madhya-desha, those from Magadha, those from Antara-veda, Kiras, Dhakkas, Saindhavas, Marukas, Gurjara, Latas, Malavas, those from Karnataka, Tajikas, (Note: Tajika here refers to Arabs) those from Kosala, those from Maharashtra, and those from Andhra.

The author also refers to languages spoken by foreigners: the Khasas, the Parasas, and the Barbaras.

== Plot ==
The novel follows the lives of five souls (jivas) as they go through several rebirths. Each soul initially degrades itself with one of the five passions: anger, vanity, deceit, greed, and infatuation. Subsequently, the five souls follow the path of righteousness in their various rebirths, guided by Jain leaders and mutual-cooperation.

The five souls and their various rebirths are:

- Chandasoma alias Bhadra-sharman > the god Padma-chandra > a lion > a god > Svyam-bhu-deva
- Sundari > Mana-bhata alias Shaktibhata > the god Padma-sara > prince Kuvalaya-chandra > a god > prince Mani-ratha-kumara
- Mayaditya alias Gangaditya > Padma-vara > princess Kuvalaya-mālā > a god > prince Maha-ratha
- Lobha-deva > the god Padma-prabha > Sagara-datta (a banker-turned saint) > a god > Vajra-gupta
- Vyaghradatta alias Moha-datta > the god Padma-kesara > prince Prthvi-sara > a god > prince Kama-gajendra

In the birth in which they are misguided by passions, the five souls become Jain monks guided by the preceptor Dharma-nandana, and promise to support each other in achieving libertaion in the subsequent births. In their final births, the five souls meet Mahavira, accept samlekhana, and attain liberation.

=== Introduction ===
In the introduction, the author invokes various Jain figures, including Rishabha-natha and Mahavira. He discusses several religious and philosophical concepts, including the four goals of life: dharma (righteous conduct), artha (material prosperity), kama (pleasure), and moksha (liberation). He states that his work combines the characteristics of five different varieties of the katha (story-telling) genre. He states that the text is primarily about dharma, but also covers artha and kama.

The author provides an outline of the story, and presents a discourse on durjana (wicked person) and sajjana (pious person). The text then moves to the actual story.

=== Prince Kuvalaya-chandra: his horse flies ===
King Drdha-varman rules the town of Vinita (Ayodhya) in Madhya-desha. One day, his commander Sushena returns from a successful military campaign, bringing the five-year old Malava prince Mahendra-kumara as a captive to Vinita. King Drdha-varman, who had no heir, adopts Mahendra-kumara as his son.

One day, queen Priyangu-shyama expresses frustration at not having a son of her own. The king then prays to his tutelary deity, Rajya-lakshmi, and receives a boon that an outstanding son would be born to him. Early next morning, the queen sees a dream in which the moon (Chandra) clung to a garland (mālā) of highly-fragrant lilies (kuvalaya). The king and his courtiers interpret the dream as a sign that the queen had conceived a son in accordance with the boon. After some time, the queen gives birth to prince Kuvalaya-chandra alias Shri-datta. The prince has a happy childhood, and is well-educated.

One day, the prince rides on a horse through the town, captivating ladies with his personality. Suddenly, his horse starts flying in the sky, towards the south. The prince strikes the horse with a knife, and the horse falls dead on the ground, bringing the prince down with it. An anonymous voice greets the prince, and asks him to walk southwards. The prince reaches the Vindhya forest, meets a saint, and receives a sermon from him.

=== Dharma-nandana: Biographies of Five Souls ===
King Purandara-datta, the ruler of Kaushambi, meets a Jain preceptor named Dharma-nandana. The preceptor starts a discourse, narrating stories about five passions that lead to one's miserable wanderings in the material world (samsara):

- Anger: the story of Chanda-soma, who kills his brother and sister mistaking them for his wife and her lover
- Vanity: the story of Mana-bhata, who fakes his death to test his wife's love for him, leading to suicides by his wife and other family members
- Deceit: the story of Mayaditya, a merchant who cheats his friend and feels ashamed when the friend still remains loyal to him
- Greed: the story of Lobha-deva, a trader who kills his friend, and becomes miserable after the friend is reborn as a demon (rakshasa)
- Infatuation: the story of Moha-datta, who is separated from his family as an infant, and unaware of the relationships as a grown-up, becomes infatuated with his sister, killing his father in the process

In all five stories, the main character feels remorse for his actions, and becomes a monk under the guidance of Dharma-nandana.

At night, King Purandara-datta observes Dharma-nandana and his pupils secretly. Dharma-nandana narrates a parable highlighting the importance of renunciation, and urges the five newly initiated monks (the main characters of the above-mentioned stories) to practice repentance with renunciation. The king is impressed by the integrity of the monks, and returns to his palace. The next day, the king meets Dharma-nandana, and takes the 12 vows of a lay Jain (shravaka).

Later, the five monks are reborn, meet each other, and discuss how they can attain enlightenment. The text describes successive births of the five monks, narrating related stories along the way. The five monks are reborn as follows:

- Chanda-soma > Padma-chandra > a lion in the Vindhya forest
- Mana-bhata > Padmasara > prince Kuvalaya-chandra
- Mayaditya > Padma-vara > princess Kuvalaya-mālā
- Lobha-deva > Padma-prabha > Sagara-datta who became the saint in the Vindhya forest
- Moha-datta > Padma-kesara, the god who possessed the prince's horse

In the Vindhya forest, the saint (Lobha-deva) explains the situation to prince Kuvalaya-chandra (Mana-bhata). He prophesizes that the prince will marry princess Kuvalaya-mālā (Mayaditya), and Padma-kesara (Moha-datta) will be reborn as their son. Meanwhile, the lion (Chanda-soma) dies in the forest, and becomes a god.

=== Kuvalaya-chandra's journey to the south ===
Prince Kuvalaya-chandra crosses the Vindhya peaks, and reaches the statue of a Jina beside a lake. A Yaksha girl named Kanaka-prabha emerges from the lake, and narrates the story of how the Yakshas came to worship the Jina.

The prince then crosses the Narmada river, and reaches the hermitage of a female ascetic named Enika. Her parrot narrates their past and present lives to the prince. The prince and the ascetic worship Rishabha, discuss various topics, including Samudrika-shastra, and meet vidyadharas disguised as Shabharas.

After some days, Kuvalaya-chandra tells Enika that he had to go on a mission to Vijaya-puri. He narrates his genealogy, describing himself as a member of the Ikshvaku dynasty and the Shashi-vamsa. Enika sends him off, and also sends a message about his well-being to his parents through her parrot.

Kuvalaya-chandra then reaches the Sahya mountain, and joins a caravan heading to Kanchipuri. A group of Bhilla robbers attack the caravan, and the Bhilla chief engages in a duel with the prince. The two men eventually reconcile when they realise that they are both Jains.

The Bhilla chief xintroduces himself as Darpa-parigha, a nephew of the prince's father Drdha-varman. He states that he was to be appointed as the king of Ratna-puri, but was forced to go into exile because of a conspiracy by his younger brother: he ultimately reached the Vindhyas, joined the Bhillas, and became a robber. The prince convinces Darpa-parigha to give up robbery, and follow the Jain teachings. He then leaves for Vijaya-puri, stating that his mission was to enlighten princess Kuvalaya-mālā.

=== Kuvalaya-chandra in Vijaya-puri ===
Kuvalaya-chandra reaches Vijaya, (Note: Possibly present-day Vijaydurg.) the capital of the Vijaya-puri country on the southern cost, meeting several people along the way. He learns that the beautiful princess Kuvalaya-mālā had hung an incomplete verse in the palace yard: the rest of the verse was kept secure in the royal treasury. She was prophesized to marry the person who would complete the verse displayed to the public in the palace yard. The prince overhears conversations of people from different parts of India at various places in the capital, including a residential school and a market. He then reaches the palace yard, where he comes across different rulers who had been unable to complete the verse.

Just then, an elephant gets out of control: prince Kuvalaya-chandra overpowers the elephant, mounts it, and recites the full verse. Kuvalaya-mālā is impressed, and chooses him as her life partner. Meanwhile, Mahendra-kumara comes to the scene, and the two men happily greet each other. Mahendra-kumara explains what happened at the palace after the horse flew away with the prince: his parents made several attempts to find the prince, and the entire town was in despair, until Enika's parrot brought the news of his well-being. King Drdha-varman then sent a party led by Mahendra-kumara to Vijaya-puri.

While preparations are being made to fix an astrologically auspicious date for the wedding, prince Kuvalaya-chandra desperately longs for princess Kuvalaya-mālā. The princess sends presents to the prince, and Bhogavati - an attendant of the princess - narrates her biography to the prince. Bhogavati explains that an ascetic (shramana) had informed them about the princess's previous births as Mayaditya and Padma-vara. Bhogavati then arranges a meeting between the prince and the princess. Sometime later, the wedding ceremony takes place, and the couple spends the next few days in amorous activities. One day, Kuvalaya-chandra narrates his biography to his wife, and reminds her of their past births. Kuvalaya-mālā agrees to follow Jainism, and is thus enlightened.

=== Kuvalaya-chandra starts back for Ayodhya ===
Kuvalaya-chandra receives a letter from king Drdha-varman asking him to return to Ayodhya. Accordingly, he sets out for Ayodhya on a date recommended by the royal astrologer, accompanied by Kuvalaya-mālā and Mahendra-kumara. On the way, he meets several people including king Jayanta in Jayanti and the saint Bhanu near the Sahya mountain. Bhanu narrates his autobiography, including his past birth and how he became a saint.

At a valley in the Vindhya mountains, Kuvalaya-chandra comes across some alchemists (dhatu-vadins), who were attempting to make gold, but could produce only copper. The prince corrects their mistakes, prays to the Jinas and the Siddhas, and is thus able to produce gold. He teaches the correct technique of producing gold, as described in the text Jonipahuda, to the alchemists and Kuvalaya-mālā.

=== Kuvalaya-chandra in Ayodhya ===
Prince Kuvalaya-chandra receives a warm welcome in Ayodhya, and is appointed as the heir apparent on an auspicious day chosen by astrologers. After some days, king Drdha-varman decides to abdicate the throne and lead a religious life. He and the prince discuss which religion is the best. The king's tutelary deity gives him a Brahmi manuscript outlining the aspects of the best religion, and the king wonders how to find a teacher who preaches such a religion.

On the prince's suggestion, the king invites various religious leaders to describe what they consider to be dharma (righteous conduct). The religious leaders present their views on various religious and philosophical concepts, such as soul, liberation, sacrifice, meditation, life, death, god etc. The king decides that the manuscript agreed with a Jain teacher who preached abstention from five sins and considered Arhat as the divinity. The teacher initiates the king and his companions as monks, and gives them a religious discourse.

Kuvalaya-chandra becomes the new king, and rules for several years. In accordance with the prophecy, Padma-kesara is born as prince Prthvi-sara to Kuvalaya-chandra and his queen Kuvalaya-mālā. Prthvi-sara intends to renounce the world at a young age, but is appointed the heir apparent against his wishes. Sometime later, his parents renounce the world and take to religious life, and he becomes the new king.

Later, Kuvalaya-chandra meets Darpa-parigha, who has now become a saint. Darpa-parigraha narrates his life since their last meeting, and guides Kuvalaya-candra, Kuvalaya-mālā, and Mahendra-kumara to renunciation. Sometime later, the five souls guided by Dharma-nandana are reborn and meet in heaven. Meanwhile, king Prthvi-sara appoints his son Manorathaditya on the throne, and becomes an ascetic.

=== Mahavira's Samavasarana and the Five Souls ===
During the lifetime of the Jain leader Mahavira, Kuvalaya-chandra is reborn as prince Mani-ratha to king Kanchana-ratha, in the town of Kakandi. One day, in his Samavasarana (divine preaching hall), Mahavira explains the Jain philosophy and religious concepts to several people, including king Kanchana-ratha. The prince is addicted to the cruel hobby of hunting, but Mahavira tells Kanchana-ratha that the prince will be enlightened soon.

Meanwhile, the prince Mani-ratha comes across a female deer during a hunting mission, and feels remorse at his cruelty. He meets Mahavira, who explains that in their previous births, the prince and the deer were lovers.

Sometime later, Mahavira reaches Shravasti and preaches to Gautama and others in his Samavasarana. Meanwhile, Prthvisara has been reborn as a god, and then as prince Kama-gajendra during the period of Mahavira. Kama-gajendra arrives at the scene and meets Mahavira, who narrates his life to the audience. Mahavira tells him about the current lives of his four companions, and tells him that he would achieve liberation in this life.

Mahavira then reaches Kakandi, where he continues to preach to Gautama and others. Meanwhile, prince Vajra-gupta arrives at the scene, and Mahavira narrates his life to the audience, introducing him as Lobha-deva reborn. Mahavira continues his discourse, describing the two types of gods: saraga (those with attachments) and viraga (those without attachments). (Note: The saraga gods include Govinda, Skanda, Rudra, Vyantara, Ganadhipa, Durga, Yaksha, Rakshasa, Bhuta, Pishacha, Kinnara, Kimpurusha, Gandharva, Mahoraga, Nāga, astral bodies, natural phenomenon etc.) He states that only those who worship the viraga gods attain moksha (salvation). At this point, a Brahmana boy named Svayam-bhu-deva arrives at the scene, and Mahavira narrates his life to the audience, introducing him as Chanda-soma reborn.

Subsequently, Mahavira reaches Rajagrha, and gives a discourse to king Shrenika. He also explains a dream to Shrenika's eight-year-old son, prince Maha-ratha, and explains that Maha-ratha was Kuvalaya-mālā reborn. The five souls then meet, and become Mahavira's companions. They eventually adopt samlekhana and attain liberation.

=== Conclusion ===
The author explains the purpose of various episodes and characters in the text, stating that they promote the development of the right faith. He states that a person who sincerely reads or hears the Kuvalaya-mālā develops or strengthens samyaktva (righteousness). He states that Hri-devi is instrumental for this composition, and provides some details about himself, his predecessors, and the place and time of the composition of the text.

== Scholarly interest ==
The text is an important source of information about the contemporary society, culture, polity, geography, economy and religion. The various episodes in the text are interspersed with discussions on Jain philosophy, beliefs and practices. The text also reviews beliefs and practices of non-Jain faiths, presenting them as unacceptable: these faiths include Buddhism, Charvaka, Brahmanism, Samkhya, Advaita and others.

The passages in Paishachi ("Pesaya") language, which is largely unattested, have attracted scholarly attention. Also of historical interest is the description of physical and temperamental characteristics of people from various regions, and specimens of their languages. For example, according to the author, "those from Andhra like women and warfare; they are handsome and fierce in eating; and they utter ati puti ratim."

== Critical edition ==
A. N. Upadhye prepared a critical edition of the text (1957 and 1970), based on the following manuscripts:

- A paper manuscript, kept at Bhandarkar Oriental Research Institute, Pune (No. 154 in 1881-1882 catalogue); possibly from 15th century.
- A palm-leaf manuscript kept at the big bhandara of Jaisalmer, dated to 1083 CE (Samvat 1139).

The text of these manuscripts is not exactly identical. The Pune manuscript features several omissions, which appear to be deliberate: for example, it omits several references to flesh.

In mid-13th century, Ratnaprabha-sūri wrote Kuvalayamālā-kathā, a Sanskrit-language digest of Kuvalayamālā. In 1916, Muni Chatura-vijaya published a critical edition of Ratnaprabha's work, based on three manuscripts.
