= Vatsaraja =

- Ranahastin; Maharajadhiraja; Parmeshwara

3rd Pratihara king
- Reign: c. 780 – c. 800
- Predecessor: Devaraja
- Successor: Nagabhata II
- Dynasty: Pratihara
- Mother: Bhuyikadevi
- Religion: Hinduism (Shaivism)

Vatsaraja (780–800) or Vatsraja was an Emperor of the Pratihara dynasty in Northern India. He was grand-nephew of Nagabhata I and his mother was queen Bhuyikadevi. He was the first ruler of Rajasthan to win victories over the distant regions of Kanauj and Bengal. His extensive conquests mark the rise of the Imperial Pratiharas.

== Reign ==
After Nagabhata I, he was succeeded by his nephews, there have been two rulers namely Kakkuka and Devaraja before Vatsaraja came to the throne. Kakustha or Kakkuka was the nephew of Nagabhata I and nothing much is known about him. The younger brother of Kakkuka, king Devasakti or Devaraja is described as having curbed the freedom of a multitude of rulers.

After bringing much of Rajasthan under his control, Vatsaraja then embarked to become "master of all the land lying between the two seas." Contemporary Jijasena's Harivamsha purana describes him as "master of western quarter"

According to Radhanpur Plate Inscription and Prithviraja Vijaya, Vatsaraja led an expedition against the distant eastern kingdom of Bengal, ruled by the Palas under Dharmapala. According to above inscription Dharamapala, was deprived of his two white Royal Umbrellas, and fled, pursued by the Pratihara forces under Vatsaraja's General Durlabhraj Chauhan of Shakambhari. The Prithviraja Vijaya describes Durlabhraj Chauhan as having "washed his sword at the confluence of the river Ganga and the ocean, and savouring the land of the Gaudas", The Baroda Inscription (AD 812) also refers to Nagabhata II's victory over the Gauda king Dharmapala. Through vigorous campaigning, Vatsaraja had extended his dominions to include a large part of northern India, from the Thar Desert in the west up to the frontiers of bengal in the east.

Vatsaraja took the title of Ranahastin after his Kannauj campaign, and minted coins with legends "Shri Rana Hasti". These coins were found in Rajputana, Saurashtra.

The statement of Jaina preceptor Uddyotana Suri, that the narrative Kuvalayamala was composed by him at Jalor in 778 when the ruling king was Vatsaraja, reveals that Vatsaraja ruled in Rajasthan. The evidence of the 795 CE inscription of his subordinate, brought to light by Shanta Rani Sharma, presents a detailed record of his victories over the Arabs, Indrāyudha and Bengal. It also presents evidence that contests the claim of the defeat of Vatsaraja by Dhruva. According to the Gwalior inscription of his later descendant Bhoja, Vatsaraja had 'subdued the entire world', and was the 'foremost among the most distinguished Kshatriyas'. It also mentions the defeat of the famous Bhandi clan by Vatsaraja. The Chahamana king Durlabharaja, described in the Prithviraja Vijaya as having bathed his sword at the confluence of the Ganga and the ocean, was a subordinate of Vatsaraja.

== See also ==
- Mihira Bhoja
- Osian

Preceded by Kakustha and Devaraja (760–780)	Gurjara Pratihara Emperor; 780–800 AD	Succeeded by Nagabhata II (800–833)
