= Kakustha (Pratihara dynasty) =

Pratihara king
- Reign: Second half of the 8th century
- Predecessor: Nagabhata I
- Successor: Devaraja
- Dynasty: Pratihara dynasty

Kakustha (8th century CE) was a king from the Pratihara dynasty of northern India.

According to the Gwalior prashasti inscription of Mihira Bhoja, Kakustha was the elder son of an unnamed brother of the dynasty's founder Nagabhata. Devaraja was the younger brother and successor of Kakustha. Nagabhata probably died around 760 CE, and the earliest known date of Devaraja's successor Vatsaraja is 783 CE. Thus, Kakustha and his successor Devaraja ruled between c. 760 CE and 780 CE.

The Gwalior inscription states that Kakustha added to the family's fame. It further mentions that he was known as Kakkuka ("one who always laughs"), because he would say things "in an inverted manner".

Kakustha seems to have died childless, as he was succeeded by his younger brother Devaraja.
