= Mahendrapala I =

Gurjara-Pratiharan Emperor from 885 to 910

- Parameshvara; Parama-bhattaraka; Maharajadhiraja; King of Kanyakubja; Raghukula-Chudamani

King of Kings of Āryāvarta King of Kannauj
- Reign: c. 885 – c. 910
- Predecessor: Mihira Bhoja
- Successor: Bhoja II
- Consorts: Dehanaga-Devi; Mahidevi
- Issue: Bhoja II
- Father: Mihira Bhoja
- Mother: Candra-Bhattarika-Devi

Mahendrapala I (IAST: Mahendrapāla; r. 885 – 910) was the Emperor of Aryavarta (ancient name for India, lit. 'Land of the (Indo-)Aryans') and King of Kannauj from 885 until his death in 910 and member of the Pratihara dynasty. He reigned over a vast empire in northern India. He is also mentioned on various inscriptions found in present-day Kathiawar, Punjab and Madhya Pradesh by the names Mahindrapala, Mahendrayudha, Mahisapaladeva, and also Nirbhayaraja, Nirbhayanarendra and Raghukula-tilaka in the plays of his guru Rajasekhara.

== Reign ==
Rajasekhara called Mahendrapala as "Maharajadhiraja of Aryavarta" (lit. 'King Emperor of Northern India') indicating his imperial status in northern India.

Bhoja is thought to have died around A.D. 885, and his son Mahendrapala I succeeded him. The earliest record of Mahendrapala dates to A.D. 893. There is an unclear verse in a work called Rdjatarangvn, that hints he may have lost some land in the Punjab—a territory his father had gained—to a Kashmiri king named Sahkaravarman. Other than that uncertain detail, Mahendrapala kept the large empire he inherited and even pushed its borders further east.

According to historian R.C. Majumdar, the empire of Mahendrapala I stretched from the Himalayan region in the north to the Vindhya range in the south, and from the eastern coast to the western sea. Earlier it was thought that the greater part of Magadha and even the parts of North Bengal had come under the suzerainty of the emperor Mahendrapal I. However, that theory has been debunked due to the discovery of a Pala king named Mahendrapala , whose inscriptions were mistakenly attributed to his Gurjara namesake.

Mahendrapala’s name appears in several forms, including Mahindrapala and Mahendrayudha, and he was also known by titles such as Nirbhaya-narendra or Nirbhayaraja. His spiritual teacher, Rajaiekhara, was a well-known figure in Indian literature. Although Rajaiekhara's writings do not provide many details about Mahendrapala’s life or character, they clearly celebrate the magnificence of the imperial city of Kanauj.

Preceded by Mihira Bhoja (835–890)	Pratihara Emperor; 890–910	Succeeded by Bhoja II (910–913)
