= Nagabhata I =

Founder of the Pratihara dynasty of India

Founder of Pratihara dynasty
- Reign: c. 730 – c. 760
- Successor: Kakustha
- Dynasty: Pratihara dynasty

Nagabhata I (r. c. 730 – 760 CE) was the founder of the imperial Pratihara dynasty in northern India. He ruled the Avanti (or Malava) region in present-day Madhya Pradesh, from his capital at Ujjain. He may have extended his control over Gurjaradesa, which includes parts of present-day Gujarat and Rajasthan. He repulsed an Arab invasion from Sindh, probably led by Junayd ibn Abd al-Rahman al-Murri or Al Hakam ibn Awana.

== Early life ==
Nagabhata has been named as the founder of the imperial Pratihara dynasty in the Gwalior inscription of his descendant Mihira Bhoja. The exact date of Nagabhata's accession is not known. His grand-nephew Vatsaraja is known to have been ruling in Avanti in 783–784 CE. Assuming a period of 25 years for each generation, Nagabhata can be presumed to have ascended the throne around 730 CE.

The Gwalior inscription traces the dynasty's origin to the legendary hero Lakshmana. He ruled from Ujjain in the Avanti region. The Jain text Harivamsa (783–784 CE) states that his grand-nephew Vatsaraja was the king and a "son of Avanti soil" (Avanti-bhūbriti). It also describes the other neighbouring kingdoms leaving one in no doubt about its location. The 871 CE Sanjan copper-plate inscription of the Rashtrakuta ruler Amoghavarsha also suggests the association of the Gurjara-Pratiharas with Ujjain. Based on this, a number of historians, including R. C. Majumdar and Baij Nath Puri, hold the view that Ujjain, the capital of Avanti, was the original home of Nagabhata's dynasty.

Dasharatha Sharma, on the other hand, theorized that Nagabhata originated from present-day Rajasthan. His theory is based on the identification of Nagabhata with Nāhada, who is mentioned in a medieval Jain prabandha (legendary chronicle) as a "soldier of fortune" and the first ruler of his family. The text states that Nāhada made Jābālipura (identified with Jalor) his capital and came into conflict with a Muslim ruler, whom he defeated. Sharma put forward the view that Jalor was the original home of the Gurjara-Pratiharas, from whence they might have emigrated.

== Military career ==
=== Arab invasion ===
According to the Gwalior inscription of his descendant Mihira Bhoja, Nagabhata repulsed a mlechha invasion. These mlechchhas are identified with the Umayyad Arab Muslims. The 9th century Muslim historian Al-Baladhuri refers to Arab invasions of Uzain (Ujjain); this appears to be a reference to their conflict with Nagabhata. The invasion was led by Junayd ibn Abd al-Rahman al-Murri or by Al Hakam ibn Awana, a general and governor of Sindh under the Umayyad caliph Hisham ibn Abd al-Malik. Al-Baladhuri mentions the conquests of several other places by these invaders, but about Ujjain, he only mentions that the city was invaded. This appears to be a tacit admission that the invasion was unsuccessful.

The semi-legendary Guhila ruler Bappa Rawal is also said to have repulsed an Arab invasion. Historian R. V. Somani theorizes that he was a part of an anti-Arab confederacy formed by Nagabhata.

=== Rashtrakuta invasion ===
Nagabhata appears to have been defeated by the Rashtrakuta ruler Dantidurga. According to the Rashtrakuta records, the ruler of Malava was among the kings defeated by Dantidurga. The Sanjan inscription of Dantidurga's descendant Amoghavarsha states that Dantidurga performed a religious ceremony at Ujjayini (Ujjain, the capital of Nagabhata). During this ceremony, the Lord of Gurjara (Gurjaresha) acted as a pratihara (door-keeper) of Dantidurga. The usage of the word pratihara seems to be a word play, suggesting that the Rashtrakuta king subdued the Gurjara-Pratihara king who was ruling Avanti at that time.

=== Identification with Nagavaloka ===
The 756 CE Hansot inscription of a Chahamana ruler Bhartrvaddha records the grant of a village during the reign of his overlord Nagavaloka. D. R. Bhandarkar and other historians have identified Nagavolka with Nagabhata. If this assumption is true, it is possible that after the Rashtrakutas left, Nagabhata regained his power, and conquered the area around Bhrigukachchha (Bharuch), where a Chahamana branch ruled under his suzerainty. According to historian B. N. Puri, Nagabhata may have conquered this region from Chalukya feudatory Avanijanashraya Pulakeshin. Thus, besides Malwa, Nagabhata's kingdom may have comprised parts of present-day Gujarat and Rajasthan.

=== Other ===
The Ragholi copper-plate inscription of the Shaila dynasty ruler Jayavardhana states that his ancestor Prithuvardhana defeated a Gurjara ruler. R. C. Majumdar believed that the defeated ruler might have been Nagabhata. However, B. N. Puri disagrees with this theory, and believes that Prithuvardhana ruled around 694 CE, several years before Nagabhata's ascension.

An inscription of Gallaka, a subordinate of Vatsaraja, in the year 795 regards Nagabhata I as the one who had acquired victory over the "invincible Gurjaras" and obtained fame. Thus, even though the dynasty is called Gurjara-Pratiharas, it is certain that the kings themselves were not from Gurjara tribe.

== Successors ==
Based on the identification of Nagabhata with Nagavaloka mentioned in the 756 CE Hansot inscription, Nagabhata appears to have ruled until around 760 CE. The Gwalior inscription suggests that he was succeeded by Kakustha and Devaraja, who were sons of his unnamed brother.
