= Gurjaradesha =

Historical region of northwestern India

Places in Gurjaradeśa, as mentioned in historical texts and determined from the find spots of inscriptions (blue). The neighbouring places are shown as triangles (gray).

Gurjaradesa (lit. 'Gurjara country'), or Gurjaratra, was a historical region in western India comprising southern Rajasthan and northern Gujarat during the period of 6th–12th century CE. The predominant power of the region, Gurjara-Pratihara, eventually controlled a major part of north India centered at Kannauj. The current Indian state of Gujarat derives its name from Gurjaratra.

== Name ==
It is believed that the region derived its name from the Gurjars. The term Gurjara also denoted any residents of Gurjaradesha who were all referred to as Gurjaras and differentiated from neighbouring peoples like Saindhavas (people of Sindh), Latas (people of Lata in southern Gujarat) and Malavas (people of Malwa).

Gurjaradēśa, or Gurjara country, is first attested in Bana's Harshacharita (7th century CE). Its king is said to have been subdued by Harsha's father Prabhakaravardhana (died c. 605 CE). The bracketing of Gurjaradēśa with Sindha (Sindh), Lāta (southern Gujarat) and Malava (western Malwa) indicates that the region including the northern Gujarat and Rajasthan is meant.

== Early references ==
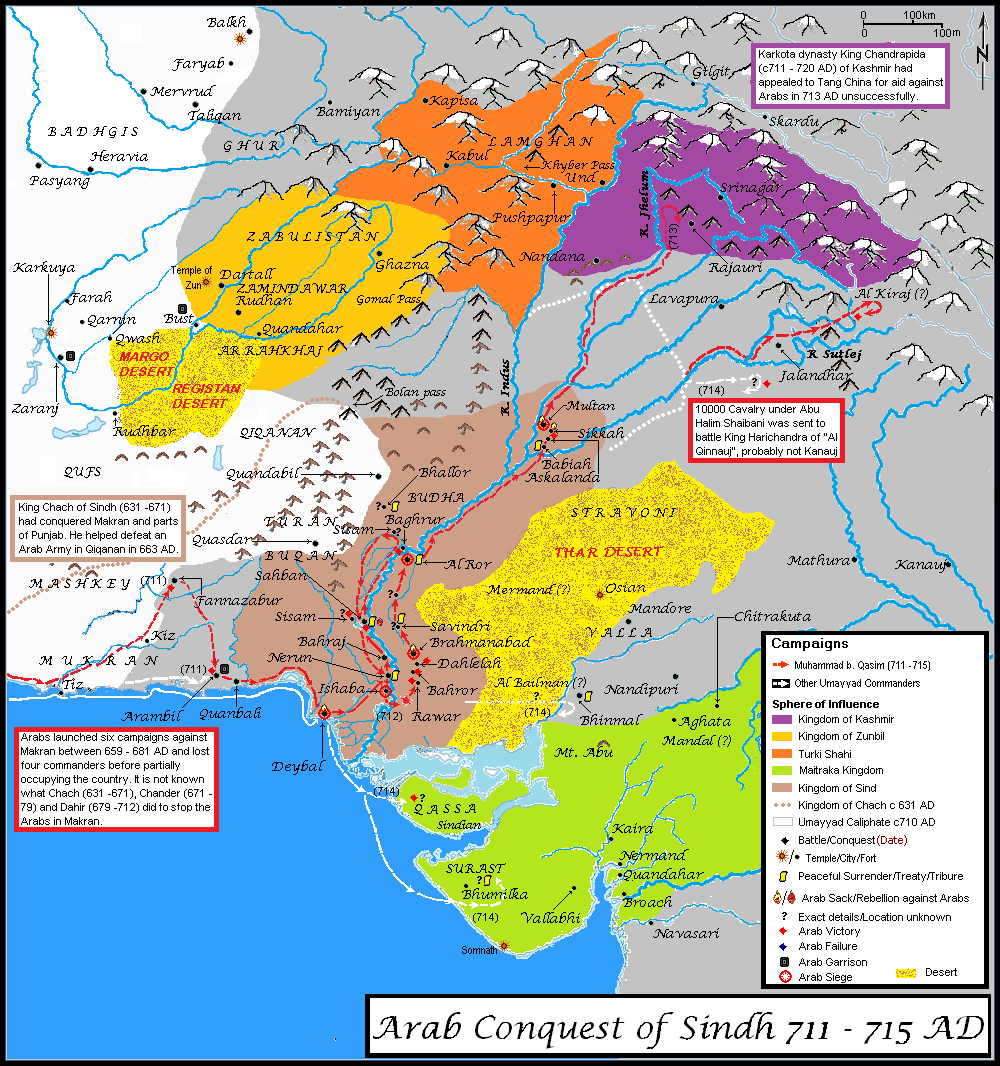
Campaigns of Mohammad bin Qasim (712–715), including attacks on Bhinmal.

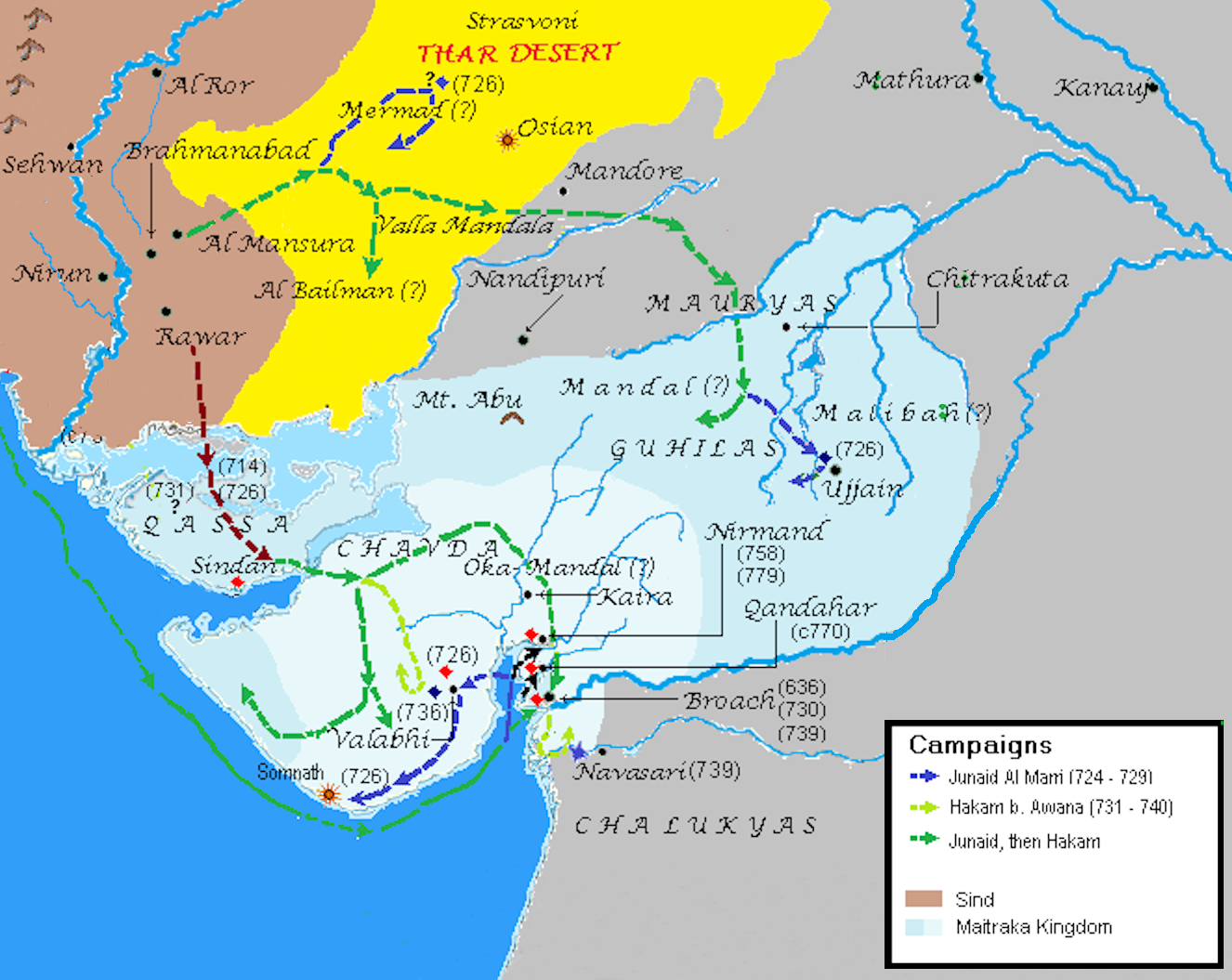
Arab campaigns from the Caliphal province of Sind into Gujarat and Gurjaradesa in 724–740 CE.

Xuanzang, the Chinese Buddhist pilgrim who visited India between 631–645 CE during Harsha's reign, mentioned the Gurjara country (Kiu-che-lo) with its capital at Bhinmal (Pi-lo-mo-lo) as the second largest kingdom of western India. He distinguished it from the neighbouring kingdoms of Bharukaccha (Bharuch), Ujjayini (Ujjain), Malava (Malwa), Valabhi and Surashtra. The Gurjara kingdom was said to have measured 833 miles in circuit and its ruler was a 20-year old kshatriya, who was distinguished for his wisdom and courage. It is known that, in 628 CE, the kingdom at Bhinmal was ruled by a Chavda dynasty ruler Vyāgrahamukha, under whose reign the mathematician-astronomer Brahmagupta wrote his famous treatise. It is believed that the young ruler mentioned by Xuanzang must have been his immediate successor. It appears that the Gurjaradesha at that time comprised modern Rajasthan.

== Successor kingdoms ==
Following the death of Harsha, his empire split up into small kingdoms. Gurjaradesha is believed to have then become independent. The Pratihara dynasty of Mandavyapura was founded by Harichandra Rohilladhi at Mandore (Mandavyapura) in about 600 CE. This is expected to have been a small kingdom. Harichandra's descendant, Nagabhata, later shifted the capital from Mandavyapura to Merta (Medāntakapura) in about 680 CE. It later became a feudatory of the Pratihara dynasty of Kannauj, also known as the Gurjara-Pratiharas, founded by Nagabhata I.

The Arab chroniclers of Sindh (an Arab province from 712 CE onward), narrated the campaigns of Arab governors on Jurz, the Arabic term for Gurjaradesha. They mentioned it jointly with Mermad (Marumāda, in Western Rajasthan) and Al Baylaman (Bhinmal). The country was first conquered by Mohammad bin Qasim (712-715) and, for a second time, by Junayd (723-726). Upon bin Qasim's victory, Al-Baladhuri mentioned that the Indian rulers, including that of Bhinmal, accepted Islam and paid tribute. They presumably recanted after bin Qasim's departure, which made Junayd's attack necessary. After Junayd's reconquest, the kingdom at Bhinmal appears to have been annexed by the Arabs.

Nagabhata I founded his kingdom at Jalore, in the vicinity of Bhinmal, in about 730 CE, soon after Junayd's end of term in Sindh. Nagabhata is said to have defeated the "invincible Gurjaras," presumably those of Bhinmal. Another account credits him for having defeated a "Muslim ruler." Nagabhata is also known to have repelled the Arabs during a later raid. His dynasty later expanded to Ujjain and called itself Pratihara. The rival kingdoms of the Pratiharas, the Rashtrakutas and Palas, however continued to call them Gurjaras or kings of the Gurjaras. The Pratiharas became the dominant force of the entire Rajasthan and Gujarat regions, establishing a powerful empire centered at Kannauj, the former capital of Harsha.

The Gurjara dynasty of Lata or Bharuch started with Dadda I, who is identified with Harichandra's youngest son of the same name by many historians. They were always recognized as vassals (sāmantas) though their allegiance might have varied over time. They are believed to have wrested a fair portion of the Lata province of the Chaulukyas and their kingdom also came to be regarded as part of Gurjaradesha.

== Later references ==
Udyotana Suri's Kuvalayamala composed in Jalore in 778 CE describes in detail Gurjaradesha as a beautiful country, whose residents are also referred to as Gurjaras. They were differentiated from the Saindhavas (people of Sindh), Latas (people of Lata in southern Gujarat), Malavas (people of Malwa) and Meravas. They were mentioned to be devotees of dharma and clever in matters of peace as well as war.

The term Gurjaratra is first mentioned in the Ghatiyala inscription of Kakkuka (of the Mandavyapura Pratiharas) in 861 CE. Kakkuka is said to have won the love of the people of Gurjaratra along with those Marumada, Valla and Travani. Later records suggest that this Gurjaratra mandala was in the region of Didwana of the old Jodhpur State.

In later times, the term Gurjaratra is used to connote the present day Gujarat. Jinadatta Suri (1075-1154 CE) mentions a country of Gujaratta with its capital at Anahilapataka (Patan) in northern Gujarat. The Chaulukyas (Solankis) are also referred to as Gurjaras in inscriptions and their country as Gurjaradesa.

== Culture and science ==
Bhinmal was a great centre of learning. According to Kanhadade Prabandha, it had 45,000 Brahmins who never tired of studying the ancient sacred books.

Brahmagupta, the well-known mathematician astronomer, was born in 598 CE in Bhinmal. He is likely to have lived most of his life in the town, during the empire of Harsha. He wrote two texts on mathematics and astronomy: the Brāhmasphuṭasiddhānta in 628, and the Khandakhadyaka in 665. He made seminal contributions to mathematics, including the first mathematical treatment of zero, rules for manipulating positive and negative numbers, as well as algorithms for algebraic operations on decimal numbers. His work on astronomy and mathematics was transmitted to the court of the Abbasid Caliph Al-Mansur (r. 754-775 CE), who had the Indian astronomical texts translated into Arabic as Zij as-Sindhind. Through these texts, the Hindu–Arabic numeral system spread through the Arab world and later Europe.

The Sanskrit poet Magha, the author of Sisupalavadha, lived here in 680 CE. The Jain scholar Siddharshi Gani, a resident of Bhinmal wrote Upmitibahava prapancha katha in 905 CE. A Jain Ramayana was written by the Jain monk Vijayagani in 1595 CE. Jain acharya Udyotana Suri wrote Kuvalayamala here.

== See also ==
- Origin of the Gurjara-Pratiharas
- Gurjara-Pratihara dynasty#Etymology and origin
