= Pratihara dynasty =

Northern Indian dynasty (730–1036)

Gurjara Pratihara dynasty
- c. 730–1036
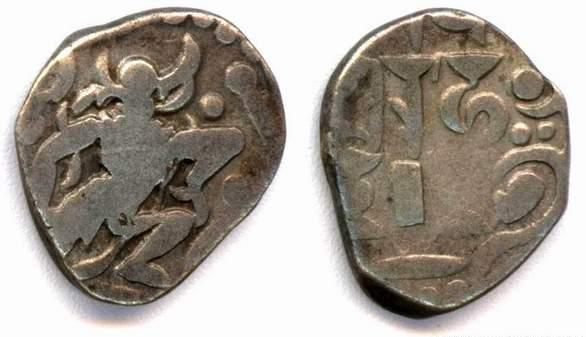
- Gurjara-Pratihara coinage of Mihira Bhoja, King of Kanauj. Obv: Boar, avatar of Vishnu, and solar symbol. Rev: Traces of Sasanian type. Legend: Srímad Ādi Varāha "The fortunate primaeval boar".

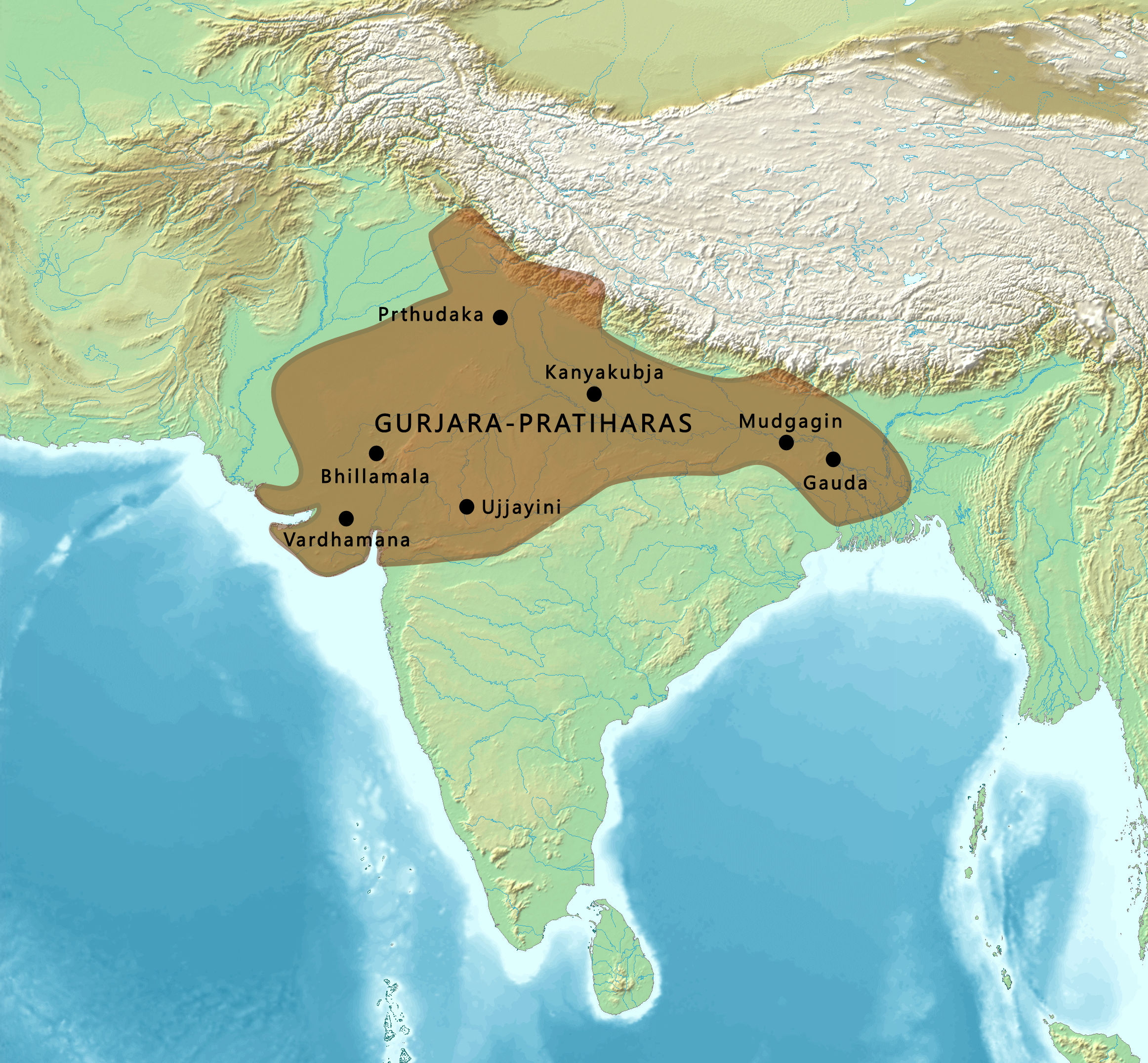
- Extent of the Pratihara Empire at its peak (c. 800—950 CE) and neighbouring polities.
- Capital: Avanti; Kannauj
- Common languages: Sanskrit, Prakrit
- Religion: Hinduism
- Government: Monarchy
  - c. 730–c. 760: Nagabhata I (first)
  - c. 1024–c. 1036: Yasahpala (last)
- Historical era: Medieval India
  - Established: c. 730
  - Conquest of Kannauj by Mahmud of Ghazni: 1018
  - Disestablished: 1036
Preceded by
Chavda dynasty
Varman dynasty of Kannauj
Succeeded by
Pala Empire
Chandela dynasty
Paramara dynasty
Kalachuris of Tripuri
Tomara dynasty
Chavda dynasty
Chahamanas of Shakambhari
Ghaznavid Empire
Guhila dynasty
- Today part of: India; Bangladesh; Nepal

The Pratihara dynasty, also called the Gurjara-Pratiharas, the Pratiharas of Kannauj or the Imperial Pratiharas, was a prominent medieval Indian dynasty which initially ruled the Gurjaradesa until its victory in the Tripartite Struggle in 816 in which Pratiharas secured the throne of Kannauj. Cadet branches of the dynasty ruled other minor states in the subcontinent. Pratihara are known for their sculptures, carved panels and open pavilion style temples.

The Pratiharas were instrumental in containing Arab armies to the west of Indus River. Nagabhata I defeated an Arab army during the Caliphate campaigns in India. Under Nagabhata II, the Pratiharas became the most powerful dynasty in northern India. He was succeeded by his son Ramabhadra, who ruled briefly before being succeeded by his son, Mihira Bhoja. Under Bhoja and his successor Mahendrapala I, the Pratihara dynasty reached its peak of prosperity and power. By the time of Mahendrapala, the extent of its territory rivalled that of the Gupta Empire stretching from the border of Sindh in the west to Bengal in the east and from the Himalayas in the north to areas past the Narmada in the south. The expansion triggered a tripartite power struggle with the Rashtrakuta and Pala empires for control of northern India. During this period, Imperial Pratihara took the title of Maharajadhiraja of Āryāvarta (Great King of Kings of Aryan Lands).

The power of the Pratihara dynasty was weakened by dynastic strife, and further diminished as a result of a great raid led by the Rashtrakuta ruler Indra III who, in about 916, sacked Kannauj. Under a succession of rather obscure rulers, the dynasty never regained its former influence. Their feudatories became increasingly powerful, throwing off their allegiance until, by the end of the tenth century, the dynasty controlled little more than the Gangetic Doab. Their last important king, Rajyapala, was killed by Vidyadhara for fleeing from Kannauj and subsequently returning to surrender to Mahmud of Ghazni in 1018. Vidyadhara placed his son Trilochanpala on the throne as the proxy of the Chandela Empire. Jasapala, the last Pratihara ruler of Kannauj, died in 1036.

== Etymology and origin ==
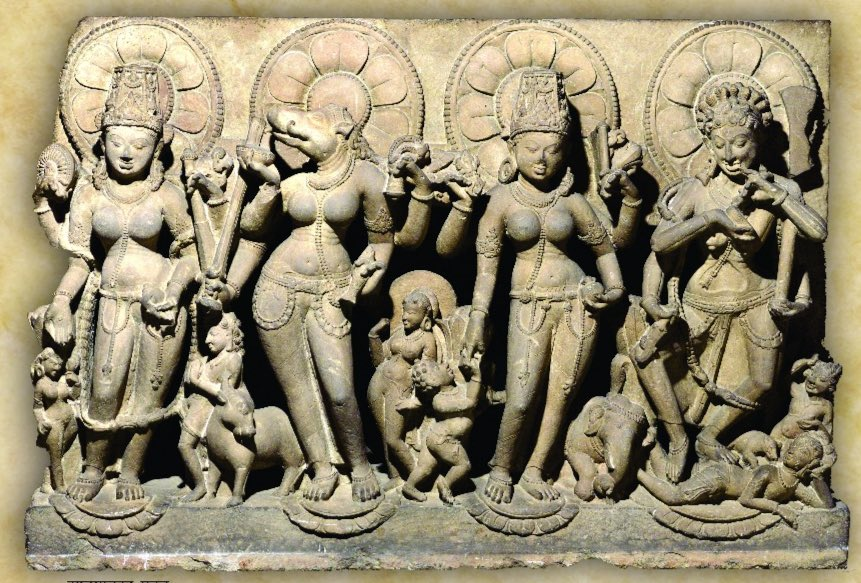
A panel depicting the Saptamatrikas, Kannauj, 9th-10 century, Pratihara dynasty

The origin of the dynasty and the meaning of the term 'Gurjara' in its name is disputed among historians. The rulers of this dynasty used the self-designation 'Pratihara' for their clan, and never referred to themselves as Gurjaras. They claimed descent from the legendary hero Lakshmana, who is said to have acted as a pratihara ("door-keeper") for his brother Rama.

Multiple inscriptions of their neighbouring dynasties describe the Pratiharas as Gurjara. The term Gurjara-Pratihara occurs only in the Rajor inscription of a feudatory ruler named Mathanadeva, who describes himself as a Gurjara-Pratihara. According to one school of thought, Gurjara was the name of the territory, Gurjaradesa, originally ruled by the Pratiharas; gradually, the term came to denote the people of this territory. An opposing theory is that Gurjara was the name of the tribe to which the dynasty belonged, and Pratihara was a clan of this tribe.

Among those who believe that the term Gurjara was originally a tribal designation, there are disagreements over whether they were native Indians or foreigners. The proponents of the foreign origin theory point out that the Pratiharas suddenly emerged as a political power in north India around sixth century CE, shortly after the Hunas' invasion of the region. According to them Gujara-Pratiharas were "likely" formed from a fusion of the Alchon Huns ("White Huns") and native Indian elements, and can probably be considered as a Hunnic state, although the precise origins remain unclear. Critics of this theory argue that there is no conclusive evidence of their foreign origin: they were well-assimilated in the Indian culture. Moreover, if they invaded India through the north-west, it is inexplicable why would they choose to settle in the semi-arid area of present-day Rajasthan, rather than the fertile Indo-Gangetic Plain. While scholars such as R. K. Gupta and S. R. Bakshi who have doubted the theory of foreign origin for Gurjaras have also opined that Gurjara-Pratiharas were among the first Rajput dynasties.

The Agnivansha legend first recorded in the 11th century Navasahananka charita by Padmagupta narrates the official origin for the Parmara dynasty. This legend was later appropriated by other dynasties including Chaulukyas, eventually making its way into Prithviraj Raso. According to the legend, the Pratiharas, Parmar, Chauhan and Chaulukya dynasties originated from a sacrificial fire-pit (agnikunda) at Mount Abu. Some colonial-era historians interpreted this myth to suggest a foreign origin for these dynasties. According to this theory, the foreigners were admitted in the Hindu caste system after performing a fire ritual. However, this legend is not found in the earliest available copies of Prithviraj Raso. It is based on a Paramara legend composed when the threat of Muslim invasions was not considered serious by Rajput states of North West and Central India. This legend was utilised in the 16th century by bards to claim a heroic descent of clans in order to foster Rajput unity against the Mughals.

== History ==
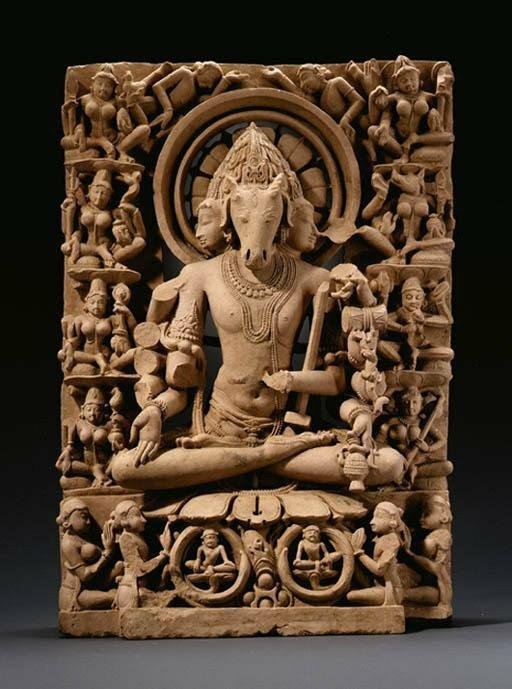
Pashupatinath, Uttar Pradesh, 9th -10th century, Pratihara dynasty

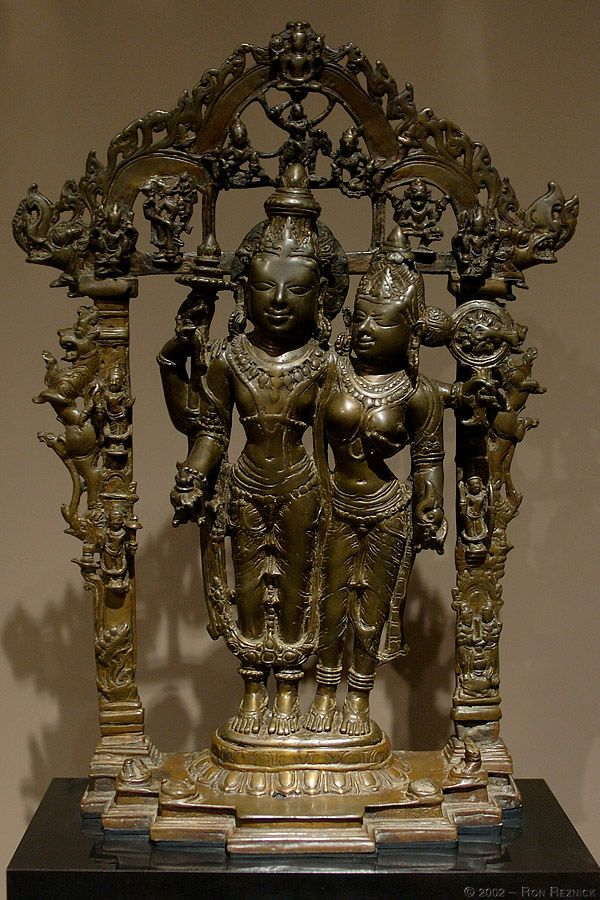
Vishnu and Lakshmi bronze, 10th-11th century, Pratihara dynasty

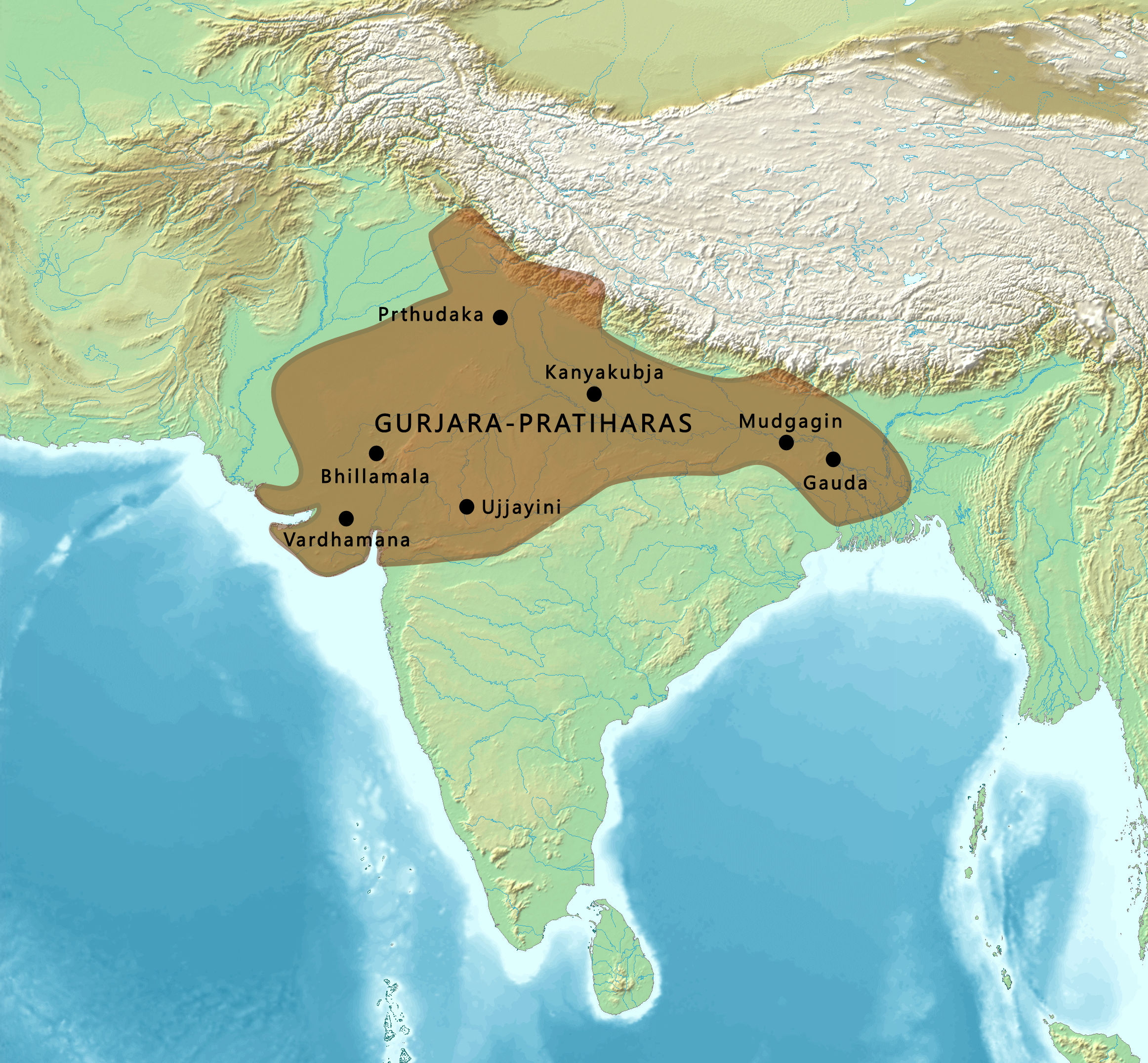
Extent of the Pratihara Empire at its peak (c. 800—950 CE) and neighbouring polities.

The original centre of Pratihara power is a matter of controversy. R. C. Majumdar, on the basis of a verse in the Harivamsha-Purana, 783 CE, the interpretation of which he conceded was not free from difficulty, held that Vatsaraja ruled at Ujjain. Dasharatha Sharma, interpreting it differently located the original capital in the Bhinmala Jalor area. M. W. Meister and Shanta Rani Sharma concur with his conclusion since the writer of the Jaina narrative Kuvalayamala states that it was composed at Jalor in the time of Vatsaraja in 778 CE, which is five years before the composition of Harivamsha-Purana.

=== Early rulers ===
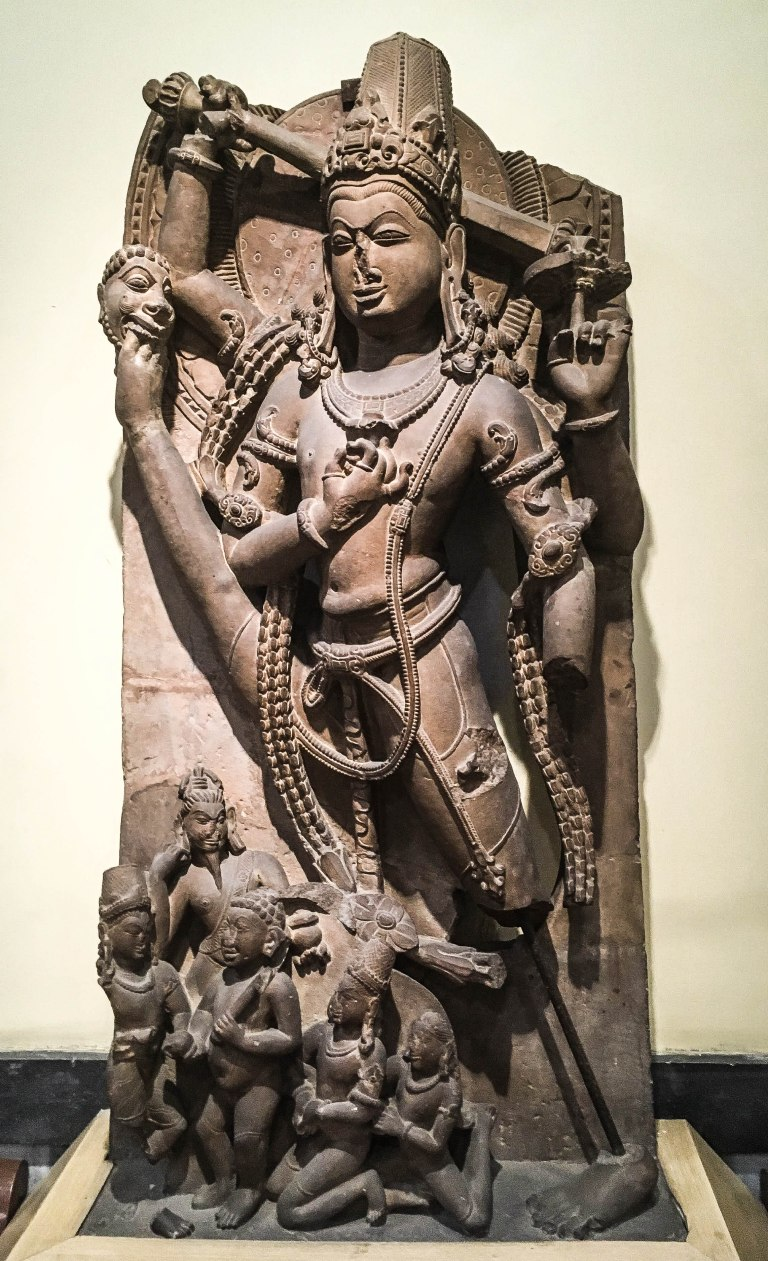
Trivikrama, Pratihara, 11th c. CE, Kashipur- UP

Nagabhata I (739–760), was originally perhaps a feudatory of the Chavdas of Bhillamala. He gained prominence after the downfall of the Chavda kingdom in the course of resisting the invading forces led by the Arabs who controlled Sindh. Nagabhata Pratihara I (730–756) later extended his control east and south from Mandor, conquering Malwa as far as Gwalior and the port of Bharuch in Gujarat. He established his capital at Avanti in Malwa, and checked the expansion of the Arabs, who had established themselves in Sind. In this battle (738 CE), Nagabhata led a confederacy of Pratiharas to defeat the Muslim Arabs who had till then been pressing on victorious through West Asia and Iran. An inscription by Mihira Bhoja ascribes Nagabhata with having appeared like Vishnu "in response to the prayers of the oppressed people to crush the large armies of the powerful Mleccha ruler, the destroyer of virtue". Nagabhata I was followed by two weak successors, his nephews Devraj and Kakkuka, who were in turn succeeded by Vatsraja (775–805).

=== Resistance to the Caliphate ===
In the Gwalior inscription, it is recorded that Pratihara emperor Nagabhata "crushed the large army of the powerful Mlechcha king." This large army consisted of cavalry, infantry, siege artillery, and probably a force of camels. Since Tamin was a new governor he had a force of Syrian cavalry from Damascus, local Arab contingents, converted Hindus of Sindh, and foreign mercenaries like the Turkics. All together the invading army may have had anywhere between 10 and 15,000 cavalry, 5000 infantry, and 2000 camels.

The Arab chronicler Sulaiman describes the army of the Pratiharas as it stood in 851 CE, "The ruler of Gurjara maintains numerous forces and no other Indian prince has so fine a cavalry. He is unfriendly to the Arabs, still he acknowledges that the king of the Arabs is the greatest of rulers. Among the princes of India there is no greater foe of the Islamic faith than he. He has got riches, and his camels and horses are numerous."

=== Conquest of Kannauj and further expansion ===
The Kanauj triangle.

After bringing much of Rajasthan under his control, Vatsaraja embarked to become "master of all the land lying between the two seas." Contemporary Jijasena's Harivamsha Purana describes him as "master of western quarter".

According to the Radhanpur Plate and Prithviraja Vijaya, Vatsaraja led an expedition against the Palas under Dharmapala of Bengal As such, the Palas came into conflict from time to time with the Imperial Pratiharas. According to the above inscription Dharmapala, was deprived of his two white Royal Umbrellas, and fled, followed by the Pratihara forces under general Durlabharaja Chauhan of Shakambhari. The Prithviraja Vijaya mentions Durlabhraj I as having "washed his sword at the confluence of the river Ganga and the ocean, and savouring the land of the Gaudas". The Baroda Inscription (AD 812) states Nagabhata defeated the Dharmapala. Through vigorous campaigning, Vatsraj had extended his dominions to include a large part of northern India, from the Thar Desert in the west up to the frontiers of Bengal in the east.

The metropolis of Kannauj had suffered a power vacuum following the death of Harsha without an heir, which resulted in the disintegration of the Empire of Harsha. This space was eventually filled by Yashovarman around a century later but his position was dependent upon an alliance with Lalitaditya Muktapida. When Muktapida undermined Yashovarman, a tri-partite struggle for control of the city developed, involving the Pratiharas, whose territory was at that time to the west and north, the Palas of Bengal in the east and the Rashtrakutas, whose base lay at the south in the Deccan. Vatsaraja successfully challenged and defeated the Pala ruler Dharmapala and Dantidurga, the Rashtrakuta king, for control of Kannauj.

Around 786, the Rashtrakuta ruler Dhruva (c. 780–793) crossed the Narmada River into Malwa, and from there tried to capture Kannauj. Vatsraja was defeated by the Dhruva Dharavarsha of the Rashtrakuta dynasty around 800. Vatsaraja was succeeded by Nagabhata II (805–833), who was initially defeated by the Rashtrakuta ruler Govinda III (793–814), but later recovered Malwa from the Rashtrakutas, conquered Kannauj and the Indo-Gangetic Plain as far as Bihar from the Palas, and again checked the Muslims in the west. He rebuilt the great Shiva temple at Somnath in Gujarat, which had been demolished in an Arab raid from Sindh. Kannauj became the center of the Pratihara state, which covered much of northern India during the peak of their power, c. 836–910.

=== Mihira Bhoja ===
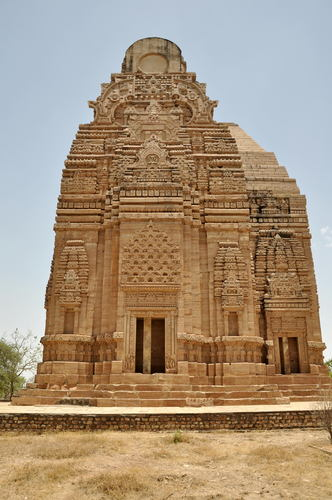
Teli ka Mandir is a Hindu Temple built by Mihira Bhoja.

Mihira Bhoja first consolidated his territories by crushing the rebellious feudatories in Rajasthan, before turning his attention against the old enemies the Palas and Rastrakutas.

After consolidating his rule, he stepped into a war of succession for the throne of Gujarat between Dhruva II of the Gujarat Rashtrakuta dynasty and his younger brother. Bhoja led a cavalry raid into Gujarat against the Dhruva while supporting his Dhruva's younger brother. Although the raid was repulsed by Dhruva II, Bhoja was able to retain dominion over parts of Gujarat and Malwa.

Bhoja's feudatory, the‌ Guhilas Samanta named Harsha of Chatsu, is described as :

"defeating the northern rulers with the help of the mighty elephant force", and "loyally presenting to Bhoja the special 'Shrivamsha' breed of horses, which could easily cross seas of sand."

Besides being a conqueror, Bhoja was a great diplomat. The kingdoms which were conquered and acknowledged his suzerainty includes Travani, Valla, Mada, Arya, Gujaratra, Lata Parvarta and Chandelas of Jejakabhukti. Bhoja's Daulatpura-Dausa Inscription (AD 843), confirms his rule in Dausa region. Another inscription states that,"Bhoja's territories extended to the east of the Sutlej river." Kalhana's Rajatarangini states that the territories of Bhoja extended to Kashmir in the north, and Bhoja had conquered Punjab by defeating ruling 'Thakkiyaka' dynasty. After Devapala's death, Bhoja defeated the Pala emperor Narayanapala and expanded his boundaries eastward into Pala-held territories near Gorakhpur.

In the early 8th century, Arabs fought on and off to take over Sindh. Imran ibn-Musa, who governed Sindh, tried to expand Arab rule to nearby areas. When Bhoja became powerful the Pratiharas fought back repulsed them from fort of Sindan, pushing the Arabs out of Kutch between 833 and 842 AD. Later on, the Arabs lost a best part of Sindh. This was the major conflict between the forces of Mihirbhoja and Imran ibn-musa

Around 880, the Gurjara-Pratiharas were defeated in large battle in Ujjain by Krishna II, the Rastrakuta king of Gujarat. However, retribution likely soon followed on the part of the Pratiharas, as by the end of his reign, Bhoja had successfully exterminated the Gujarat Rashtrakuta line.

Hudud-ul-Alam, a tenth-century Persian geographic text, states that most of the kings of India acknowledged the supremacy of the powerful 'Rai of Qinnauj', (Kannauj was the capital of the Imperial Pratiharas) whose mighty army had 150,000 strong cavalry and 800 war elephants.

=== Decline ===
Much reduced territory of the Gurjara-Pratihara in 1000, and neighbouring South Asian polities, on the eve of the Ghaznavid invasions of the subcontinent.

Bhoja II (910–912) was overthrown by Mahipala I (912–944). Several feudatories of the empire took advantage of the temporary weakness of the Pratiharas to declare their independence, notably the Paramaras of Malwa, the Chandelas of Bundelkhand, the Kalachuris of Mahakoshal, the Tomaras of Haryana, and the Chahamanas of Shakambhari. The south Indian Emperor Indra III (c. 914–928) of the Rashtrakuta dynasty briefly captured Kannauj in 916, and although the Pratiharas regained the city, their position continued to weaken in the tenth century, partly as a result of the drain of simultaneously fighting off Turkic attacks from the west, the attacks from the Rashtrakuta dynasty from the south and the Pala advances in the east. The Pratiharas lost control of Rajasthan to their feudatories, and the Chandelas captured the strategic fortress of Gwalior in central India around 950. By the end of the tenth century the Pratihara domains had dwindled to a small state centered on Kannauj.

Mahmud of Ghazni captured Kannauj in 1018, and the Pratihara ruler Rajapala fled. He was subsequently captured and killed by the Chandela ruler Vidyadhara. The Chandela ruler then placed Rajapala's son Trilochanpala on the throne as a proxy. Jasapala, the last Pratihara ruler of Kannauj, died in 1036.

The Imperial Pratihara dynasty broke into several small states after the Ghaznavid invasions. These branches fought each other for territory and one of the branches ruled Mandore till the 14th century. This Pratihara branch had marital ties with Rao Chunda of the Rathore clan and gave Mandore in dowry to Chunda. This was specifically done to form an alliance against the Turks of the Tughlaq Empire.

== Pratihara art ==
There are notable examples of architecture from the Pratihara era, including sculptures and carved panels. Their temples, constructed in an open pavilion style.

=== Māru-Gurjara architecture ===
Māru-Gurjara architecture was developed during Pratihara Empire.

- Mahavira Jain temple, Osian temple was constructed in 783 CE, making it the oldest surviving Jain temple in western India.
- Bateshwar Hindu temples, Madhya Pradesh was constructed during the Pratihara Empire between 8th to 11th century.
- Baroli temples complex are eight temples, built by the Pratiharas, is situated within a walled enclosure.
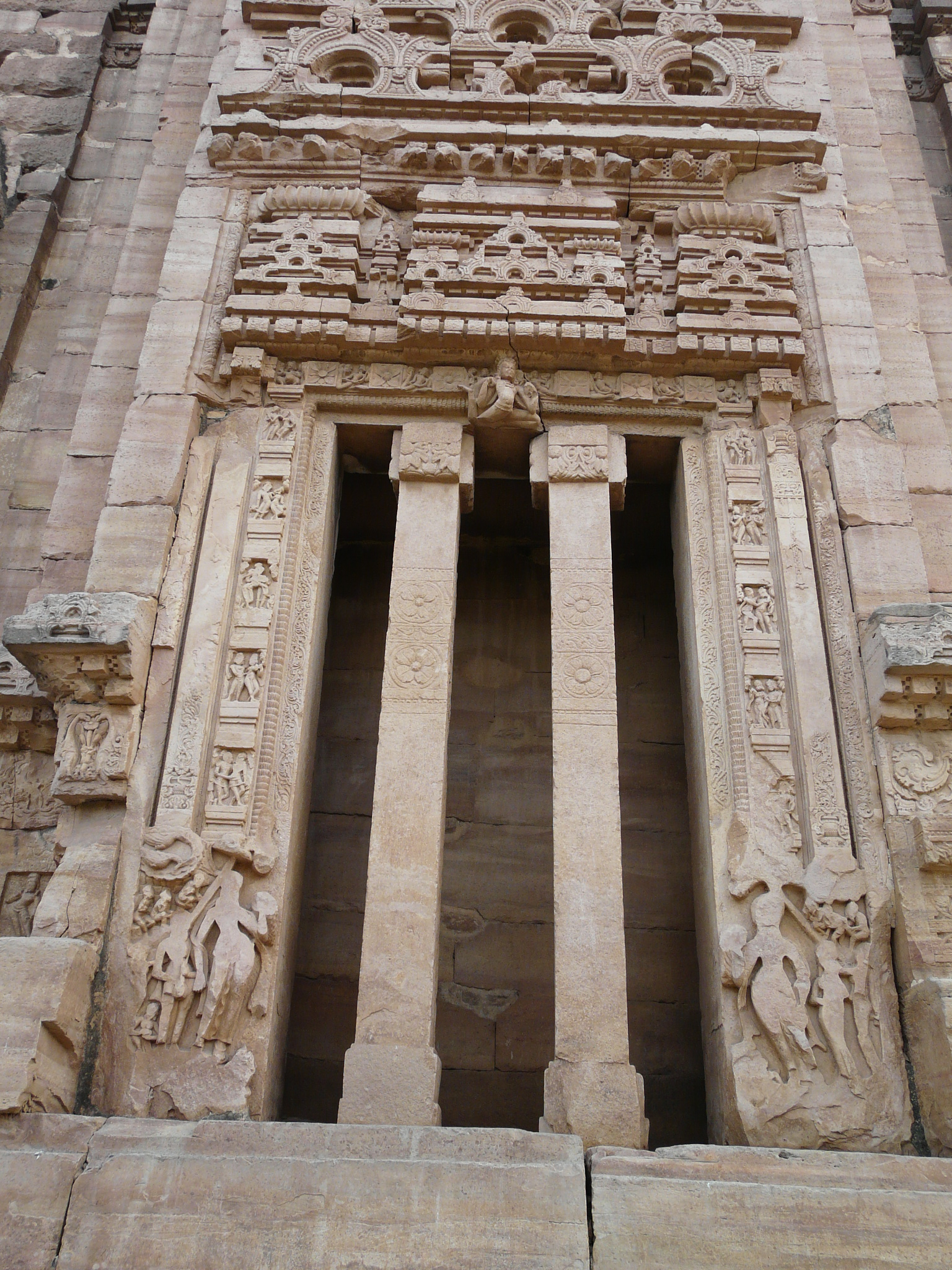
One of the four entrances of the Teli ka Mandir. This Hindu temple was built by the Pratihara emperor Mihira Bhoja.

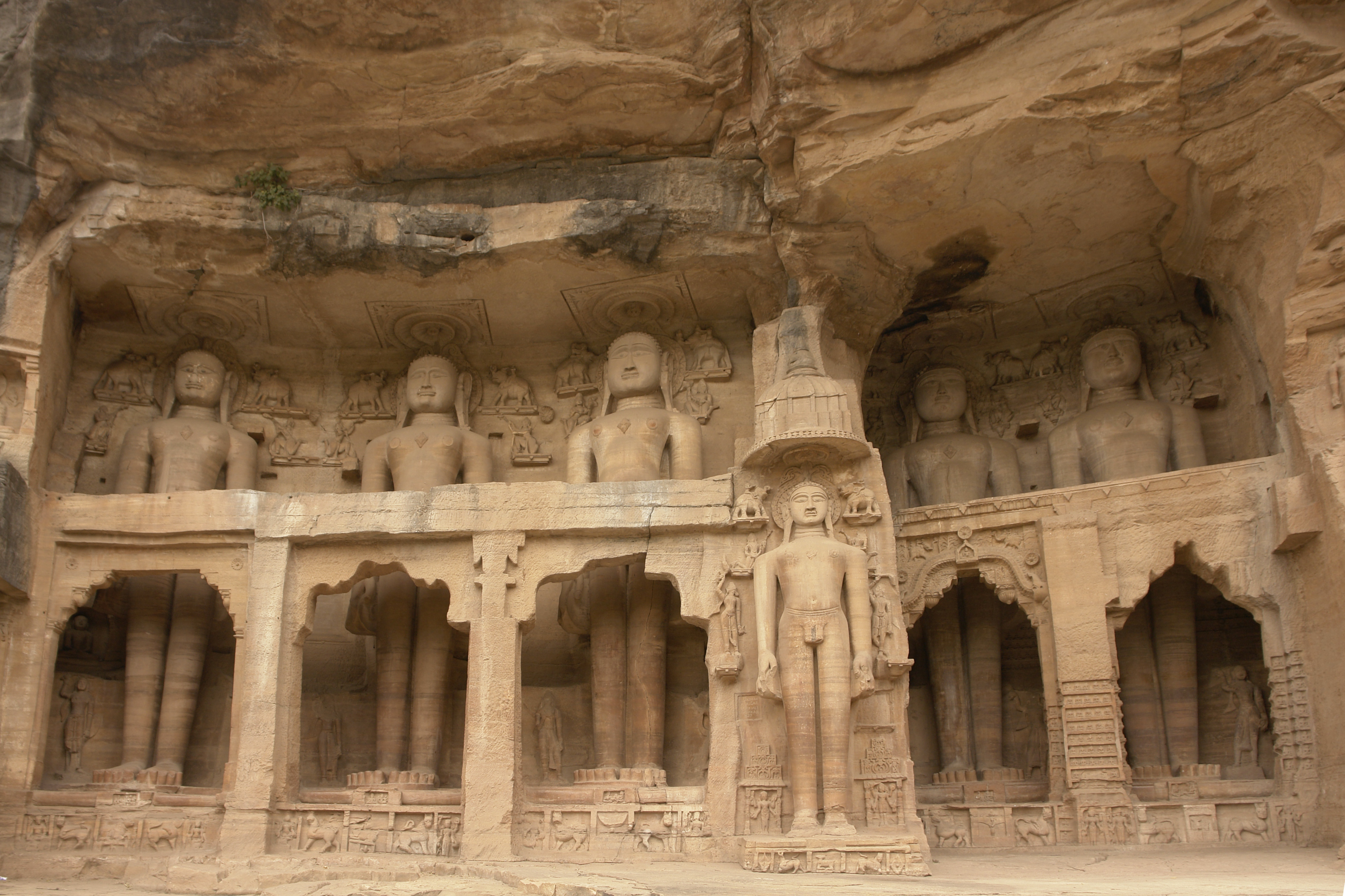
Jainism-related cave monuments and statues carved into the rock face inside Siddhachal Caves, Gwalior Fort.

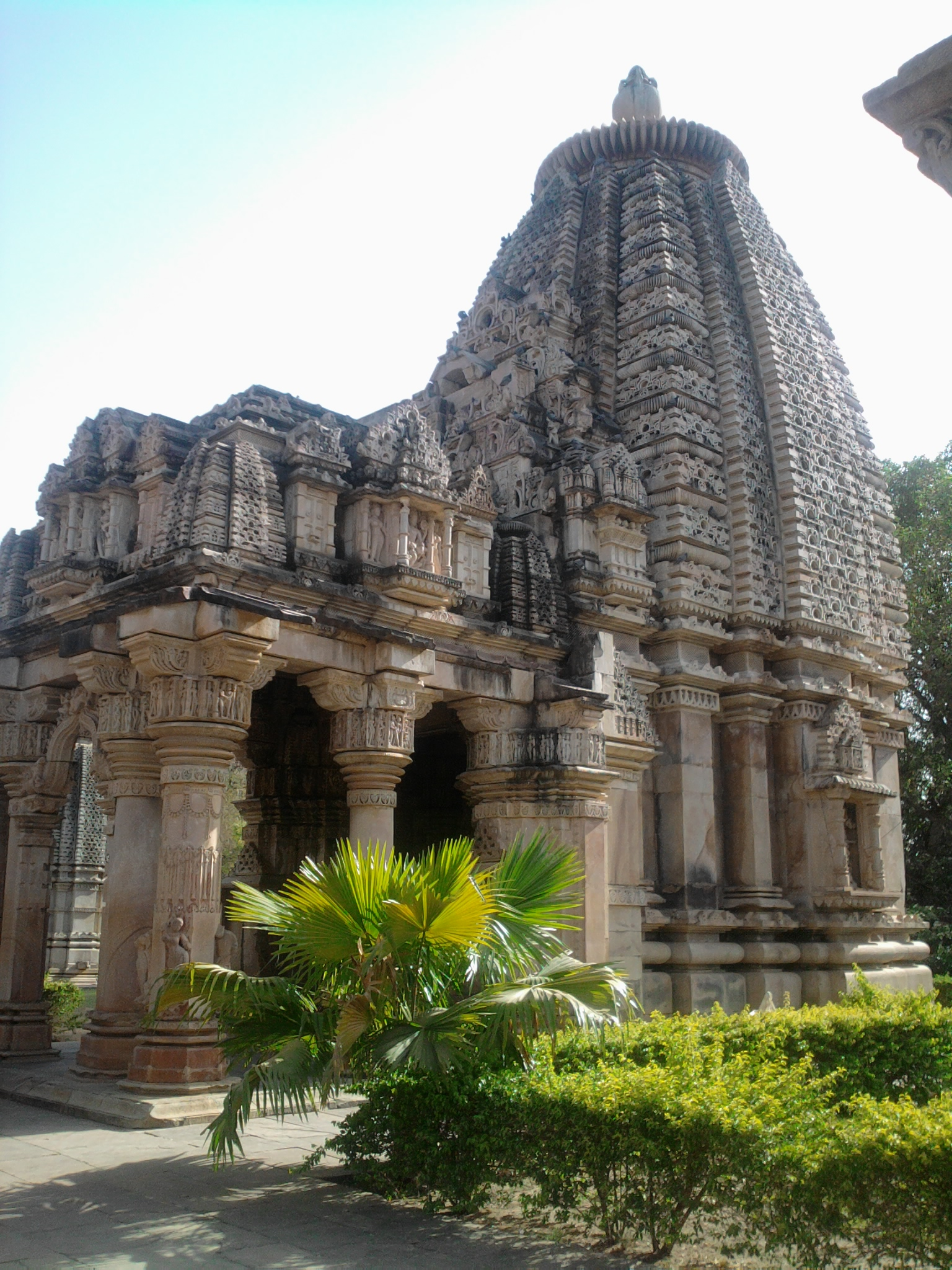
Ghateshwara Mahadeva temple at Baroli Temples complex. The complex of eight temples, built by the Pratiharas, is situated within a walled enclosure.

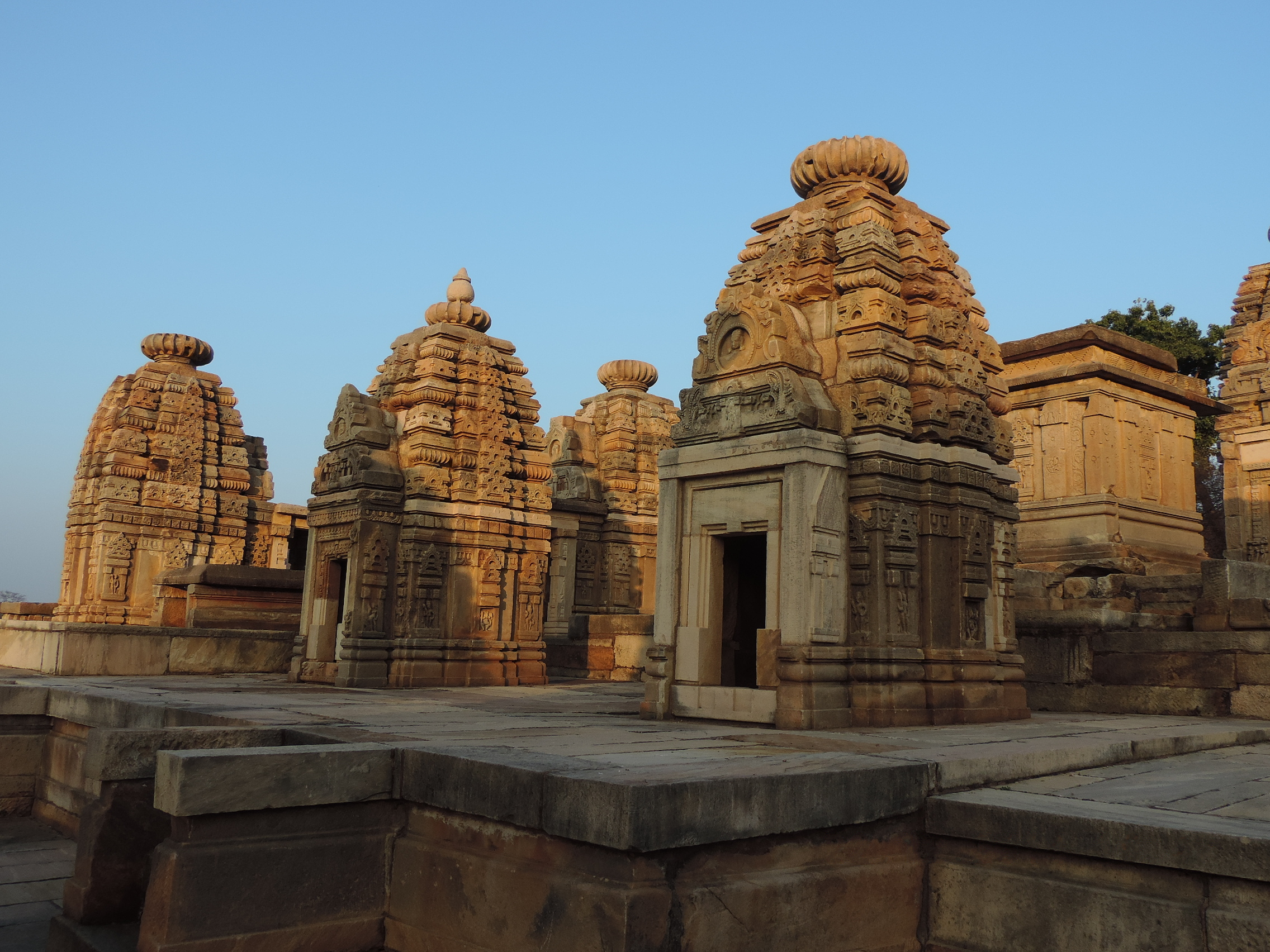
Bateshwar Hindu temples in Madhya Pradesh was built by the Pratiharas.

== Legacy ==
The Gurjara-Pratihara and contemporary Asian polities, circa 800.

Historians of India, since the days of Elphinstone, have wondered at the slow progress of Muslim invaders in India, as compared with their rapid advance in other parts of the world. The Arabs possibly only stationed small invasions independent of the Caliph. Arguments of doubtful validity have often been put forward to explain this unique phenomenon. Currently it is believed that it was the power of the Pratihara army that effectively barred the progress of the Muslims beyond the confines of Sindh, their first conquest for nearly three hundred years. In the light of later events this might be regarded as the "Chief contribution of the Pratiharas to the history of India".

== List of rulers ==
List of Imperial Pratihara dynasty rulers
Serial No.	Ruler	Reign (CE)
1	Nagabhata I	730–760
2	Kakustha and Devaraja	760–780
3	Vatsaraja	780–800
4	Nagabhata II	800–833
5	Ramabhadra	833–836
6	Mihira Bhoja or Bhoja I	836–885
7	Mahendrapala I	885–910
8	Bhoja II	910–913
9	Mahipala I	913–944
10	Mahendrapala II	944–948
11	Devapala	948–954
12	Vinayakapala	954–955
13	Mahipala II	955–956
14	Vijayapala II	956–960
15	Rajapala	960–1018
16	Trilochanapala	1018–1027
17	Yasahpala	1024–1036

== Branches ==
=== Mandavyapura branch ===
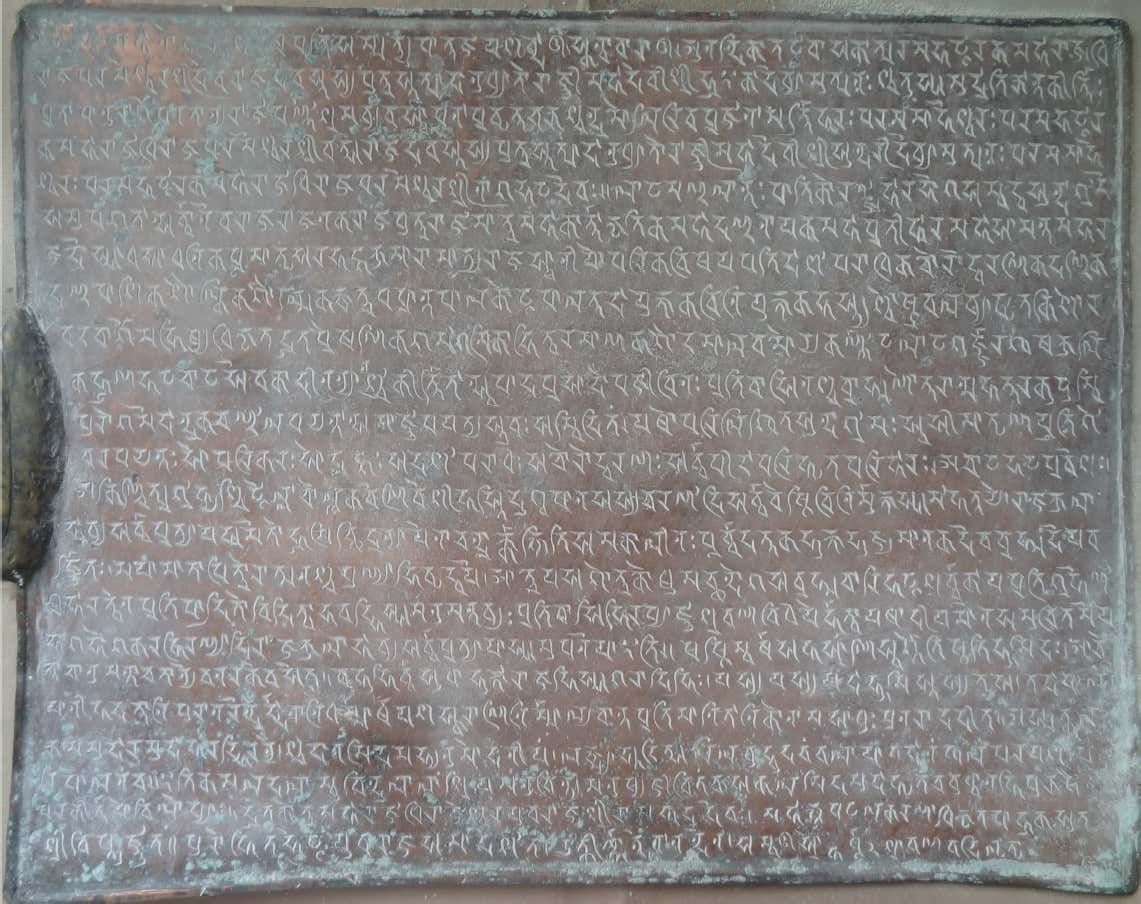
Copper plate inscription Pratiharas

=== Baddoch branch ===
Known Baddoch rulers are-

- Dhaddha I (600 – 627 CE)
- Dhaddha II (627 – 655 CE)
- Jaibhatta (655 – 700 CE)

=== Rajogarh branch ===
Badegujar were rulers of Rajogarh

- Parmeshver Manthandev, (885 – 915 CE)
- No records found after Parmeshver Manthandev

== See also ==
- History of Rajasthan
- List of battles of Rajasthan
- List of Rajput dynasties and states
- List of Hindu empires and dynasties

Timeline and cultural period	Indus plain (Punjab-Sapta Sindhu-Gujarat)	Gangetic Plain			Central India	Southern India
Timeline and cultural period	Indus plain (Punjab-Sapta Sindhu-Gujarat)	Upper Gangetic Plain (Ganga-Yamuna doab)	Middle Gangetic Plain	Lower Gangetic Plain	Central India	Southern India
IRON AGE
Culture	Late Vedic Period	Late Vedic Period; Painted Grey Ware culture	Late Vedic Period; Northern Black Polished Ware		Pre-history	
6th century BCE	Gandhara	Kuru-Panchala	Magadha		Adivasi (tribes)	Assaka
Culture	Persian-Greek influences	"Second Urbanisation"; Rise of Shramana movements Jainism - Buddhism - Ājīvika - Yoga			Pre-history	
5th century BCE	(Persian conquests)		Shaishunaga dynasty		Adivasi (tribes)	Assaka
4th century BCE	(Greek conquests)	Nanda empire				
HISTORICAL AGE
Culture	Spread of Buddhism				Pre-history	
3rd century BCE	Maurya Empire					Satavahana dynasty Sangam period (300 BCE – 200 CE); Early Cholas; Early Pandyan kingdom Cheras
Culture	Preclassical Hinduism (Note: Michaels (2004) p.39) - "Hindu Synthesis" (Note: Hiltebeitel (2002)) (ca. 200 BCE - 300 CE) (Note: Michaels (2004) p.39) (Note: Hiltebeitel (2002)); Epics - Puranas - Ramayana - Mahabharata - Bhagavad Gita - Brahma Sutras - Smarta Tradition; Mahayana Buddhism					
2nd century BCE	Indo-Greek Kingdom		Shunga Empire; Maha-Meghavahana Dynasty			Satavahana dynasty Sangam period (300 BCE – 200 CE); Early Cholas; Early Pandyan kingdom Cheras
1st century BCE	Indo-Greek Kingdom		Shunga Empire; Maha-Meghavahana Dynasty			Satavahana dynasty Sangam period (300 BCE – 200 CE); Early Cholas; Early Pandyan kingdom Cheras
1st century CE	Indo-Scythians; Indo-Parthians		Kuninda Kingdom			Satavahana dynasty Sangam period (300 BCE – 200 CE); Early Cholas; Early Pandyan kingdom Cheras
2nd century	Kushan Empire					Satavahana dynasty Sangam period (300 BCE – 200 CE); Early Cholas; Early Pandyan kingdom Cheras
3rd century	Kushano-Sasanian Kingdom; Western Satraps	Kushan Empire		Kamarupa kingdom	Adivasi (tribes)	Satavahana dynasty Sangam period (300 BCE – 200 CE); Early Cholas; Early Pandyan kingdom Cheras
Culture	"Golden Age of Hinduism"(ca. CE 320-650) (Note: Michaels (2004) p.40); Puranas - Kural; Co-existence of Hinduism and Buddhism					
4th century	Kidarites	Gupta Empire; Varman dynasty				Andhra Ikshvakus; Kalabhra dynasty Kadamba Dynasty; Western Ganga Dynasty
5th century	Hephthalite Empire	Alchon Huns				Vishnukundina; Kalabhra dynasty
6th century	Nezak Huns; Kabul Shahi; Maitraka				Adivasi (tribes)	Vishnukundina; Badami Chalukyas; Kalabhra dynasty
Culture	Late-Classical Hinduism (ca. CE 650-1100) (Note: Michaels (2004) p.41); Advaita Vedanta - Tantra; Decline of Buddhism in India					
7th century	Indo-Sassanids		Vakataka dynasty Empire of Harsha	Mlechchha dynasty	Adivasi (tribes)	Badami Chalukyas; Eastern Chalukyas; Pandyan kingdom (revival); Pallava
7th century	Karkota dynasty				Adivasi (tribes)	
8th century	Kabul Shahi	Pala Empire			Adivasi (tribes)	Eastern Chalukyas; Pandyan kingdom Kalachuri
9th century	Gurjara-Pratihara				Adivasi (tribes)	Rashtrakuta Empire; Eastern Chalukyas; Pandyan kingdom Medieval Cholas; Chera Perumals of Makkotai
10th century	Ghaznavids			Pala dynasty Kamboja-Pala dynasty	Adivasi (tribes)	Kalyani Chalukyas; Eastern Chalukyas; Medieval Cholas; Chera Perumals of Makkotai; Rashtrakuta
References and sources for table References Sources: Flood, Gavin D. (1996), An Introduction to Hinduism, Cambridge University Press; Hiltebeitel, Alf (2002), Hinduism. In: Joseph Kitagawa, "The Religious Traditions of Asia: Religion, History, and Culture", Routledge; Michaels, Axel (2004), Hinduism. Past and present, Princeton, New Jersey: Princeton University Press
