= Nagabhata II =

Pratihara emperor from 795 to 833

- Paramabhattaraka; Maharajadhiraja; Paramesvara

4th Pratihara emperor
- Reign: c. 795 – c. 833
- Predecessor: Vatsaraja
- Successor: Ramabhadra
- Dynasty: Pratihara dynasty
- Father: Vatsaraja
- Mother: Sundari-Devi
- Religion: Hinduism

Nagabhata II (died 833) was the emperor of the Pratihara dynasty from 795 to 833. He ascended the Pratihara throne after his father Vatsraja. His mother was queen Sundari-Devi. He was designated with imperial titles - Paramabhattaraka, Maharajadhiraja, and Paramesvara after conquest of Kannauj.

== Reign ==
Nagabhata II finds a mention in the Gwalior inscription. He defeated the rulers of Sindhu, Andhra, Vidarbha, Kalinga, Matsyas, Vatsas, Malavas, Kiratas, Anartas and the Arabs. He had defeated Saindhava ruler Ranaka I and conquered the western Saurashtra (now in Gujarat). He also defeated Chakrayudh at Kannauj. He was later defeated by the Rashtrakuta Emperor Govinda III (793–814) and lost Malwa and Gujarat. However, he recovered Malwa from the Rashtrakutas, conquered Kanauj and the Indo-Gangetic Plain as far as Bihar from the Palas, and again checked the Muslims in the west. Kanauj became the center of the Gurjara Pratihara state, which covered much of northern India during the peak of their power (836–910).

An inscription of his descendant, Mihira Bhoja describes Nagabhata II as "who, desirous of the great growth of virtuous acts, enjoined in the Veda, performed a series of religious ceremonies according to the custom of Kshatriya families." Nagabhata is said to have been a devotee of Bhagavati.

Nagabhatta faced a large Pala army in his early career, which had an elephant force of 50,000, led by King Dharmapala himself at Mungar, Nagabhata emerged victorious. The Chatsu Inscription of his Guhila feudatory Baladitya (813 AD) states that Shankaragana Guhila, who fought on the behalf of Vatsaraja fulfilled his vow by

"defeating Bhata, the Gauda ruler, in battle, and presented the earth at his master’s(Vatsaraja) feet”.

Nagabhata II was succeeded by Ramabhadra. Some earlier historians identified Nagabhata with Āma, who according to the Jain accounts, died in 832-833 CE (see Āma#Identification with Nagabhata II). Based on this identification, Nagabhata's reign is theorized to have ended around 833 CE. Historian Shyam Manohar Mishra, who disagrees with this identification, places Nagabhata's death around 825 CE.

Preceded by Vatsaraja (780–800)	Gurjara Pratihara Emperor; 750–780	Succeeded by Ramabhadra (833–836)
