= Mihira Bhoja =

Pratihara Emperor from 836 to 885

- Adivaraha

6th Pratihara Emperor
- Reign: c. 836 – c. 885 CE
- Predecessor: Ramabhadra
- Successor: Mahendrapala I
- Died: 885; Narmada River
- Queen: Candra-Bhattarika-devi
- Issue: Mahendrapala I
- Father: Ramabhadra
- Mother: Appa-devi
- Religion: Hinduism

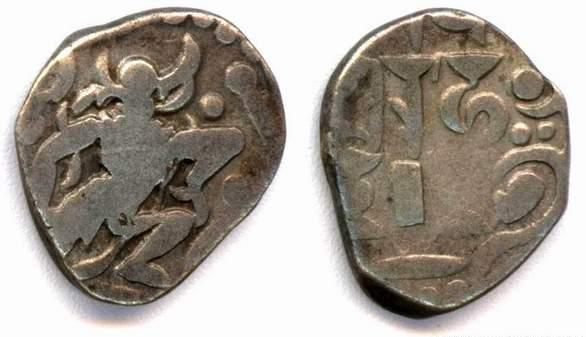
Adivaraha Dramma coin, c. 836–885 CE

Mihira Bhoja (r. c. 836 – c. 885 CE) or Bhoja I was the Pratihara emperor from 836 to 885 CE. He inherited a weakened realm in an adverse situation from his father, Ramabhadra. However, his capable reign transformed it into a large and prosperous empire. Bhoja was a devotee of Vishnu and adopted the title of Ādivarāha, which is inscribed on some of his coins.. One of the outstanding political figures of India in the ninth century, he ranks with Dhruva Dharavarsha and Dharmapala as a great general and empire builder.

At its height, Bhoja's empire extended to the Narmada River in the south, the Sutlej River in the northwest, and up to Bengal in the east. It extended over a large area from the foot of the Himalayas up to the river Narmada and included the present district of Etawah in Uttar Pradesh.

== Reign ==
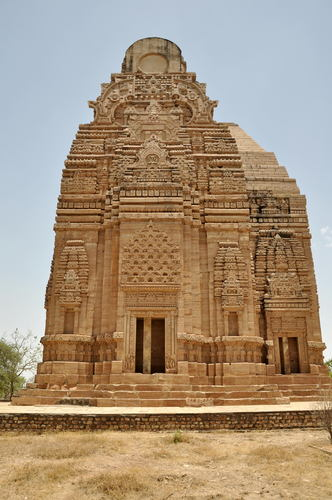
Teli ka Mandir is a Hindu Temple built by Mihira Bhoja.

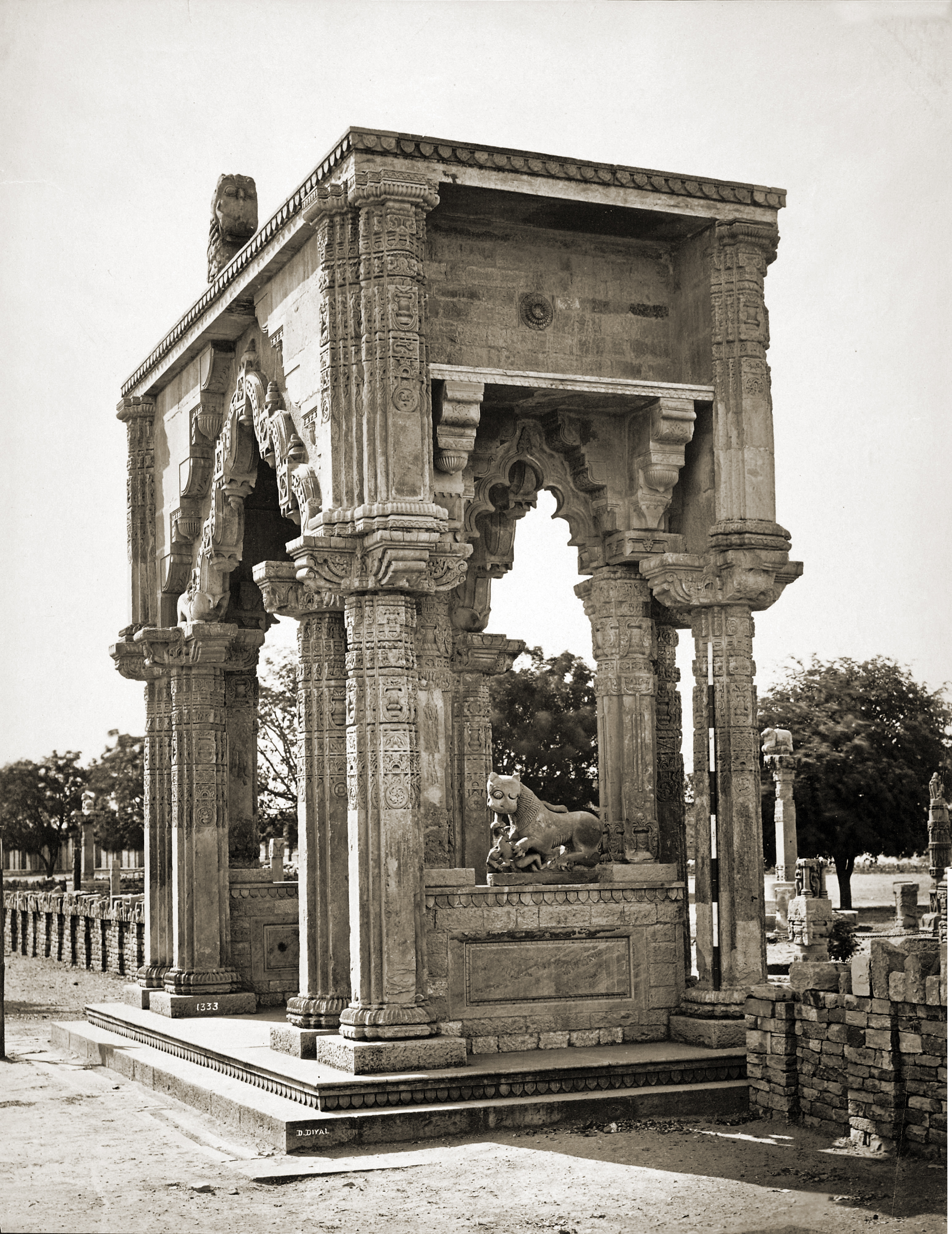
Gate of Teli ka Mandir, Gwalior Fort.

During his reign, the capital was Kannauj (present-day Uttar Pradesh).

He was a bitter enemy of the Arab-Islamic invaders who, according to an Arab chronicler, Sulaiman, maintained a large army and had a fine cavalry.

He was succeeded by his son Mahendrapala I (c. 836 – 910 CE).

== Military career ==
Mihira Bhoja first consolidated his territories by crushing the rebellious feudatories in Rajasthan, before turning his attention against the old enemies the Palas and Rastrakutas.

After consolidating his rule, he stepped into a war of succession for the throne of Gujarat between Dhruva II of the Gujarat Rashtrakuta dynasty and his younger brother. Bhoja led a cavalry raid into Gujarat against the Dhruva while supporting his Dhruva's younger brother. Although the raid was repulsed by Dhruva II, Bhoja was able to retain dominion over parts of Gujarat and Malwa.

Sometime before 888, the Gurjara-Pratiharas were defeated in large battle in Ujjain by Krishna II, the Rastrakuta king of Gujarat. However, retribution likely soon followed on the part of the Pratiharas, as by the end of his reign, Bhoja had successfully exterminated the Gujarat Rashtrakuta line.

Bhoja's feudatory, the‌ Guhilas Samanta named Harsha of Chatsu, is described as :

“defeating the northern rulers with the help of the mighty elephant force”, and “loyally presenting to Bhoja the special ‘Shrivamsha’ breed of horses, which could easily cross seas of sand."

Besides being a conqueror, Bhoja was a great diplomat. The kingdoms which were conquered and acknowledged his suzerainty includes Travani, Valla, Mada, Arya, Gujaratra, Lata Parvarta and Chandelas of Bundelkhand. Bhoja's Daulatpura-Dausa Inscription (AD 843), confirms his rule in Dausa region. Another inscription states that,"Bhoja's territories extended to the east of the Sutlej river."

Kalhana's Rajatarangini states that the territories of Bhoja extended to Kashmir in the north, and Bhoja had conquered Punjab by defeating ruling 'Thakkiyaka' dynasty .

After Devapala's death, Bhoja defeated the Pala emperor Narayanapala and expanded his boundaries eastward into Pala-held territories near Gorakhpur.

Nearing the end of his reign, around 880, Bhoja was defeated in a large battle in Ujjain by Krishna II, the Rastrakuta king of Gujarat. However, retribution likely soon followed on the part of the Pratiharas, as by the end of his reign, Bhoja had successfully exterminated the Gujarat Rashtrakuta line.

=== Conflict with Arabs ===
In the early 8th century, Arabs fought on and off to take over Sindh. Imran ibn-Musa, who governed Sindh, tried to expand Arab rule to nearby areas. When Bhoja became powerful, he evicted them from fort of Sindan, pushing the Arabs out of Kutch between 833 and 842. Later on, the Arabs lost a best part of Sindh. This was the major conflict between the forces of Mihirbhoja and Imran ibn-musa

Hudud-ul-Alam, a tenth-century Persian geographic text, states that most of the kings of India acknowledged the supremacy of the powerful 'Rai of Qinnauj', (Kannauj was the capital of the Imperial Pratiharas) whose mighty army had 150,000 strong cavalry and 800 war elephants.

== Coins of Mihira Bhoja ==
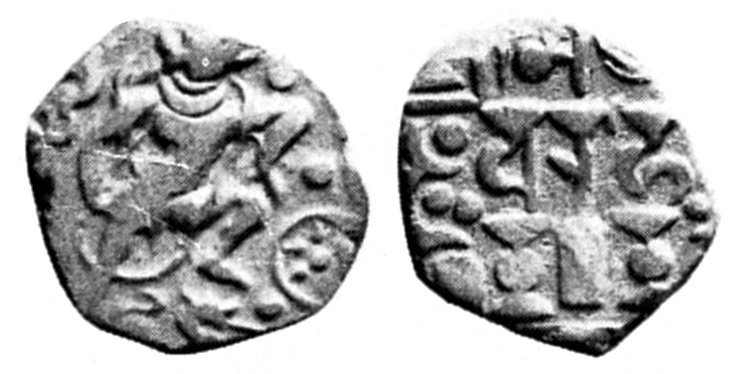
The Adivaraha drammas, coinage of the Gurjar-Pratihara ruler Bhoja I who is known by the same title, 850–900 CE. Obv: Boar, incarnation of Vishnu, and solar symbol. Rev: "Traces of Sasanian type". Legend: Srímad Ādi Varāha "The fortunate primaeval boar", a title also known to have been used for king Bhoja I.

Mihira Bhoja's epithet was Srimad-Adivaraha (the fortunate primeval boar incarnation of Vishnu) and therefore there is a broad agreement amongst the scholars on the attribution of adivaraha dramma billon coins to him. These coins have a depiction of Adivaraha on the obverse. On the obverse along with the god Adivaraha, in his right there is a solar wheel with spokes and in the left are other emblems such as mace, lotus flower and conch-shell. Under the feet of the god is probably a two-headed serpent.

According to Alexander Cunningham these types of coins are only found in silver and copper. It is suggested that copper coins were originally coated with silver to circulate as silver coins.

Adivarah coins were noted by Thakkar pheru in the 13th-century text Dravya-Pariksha who was mint master under Alauddin khilji.

== Notes ==
Preceded by Ramabhadra (833–836)	Gurjara-Pratihara Emperor; 836–885 CE	Succeeded by Mahendrapala I
