= List of Pala emperors =

Emperor of Pala Empire Gaudeswar of Pala Empire
- Imperial
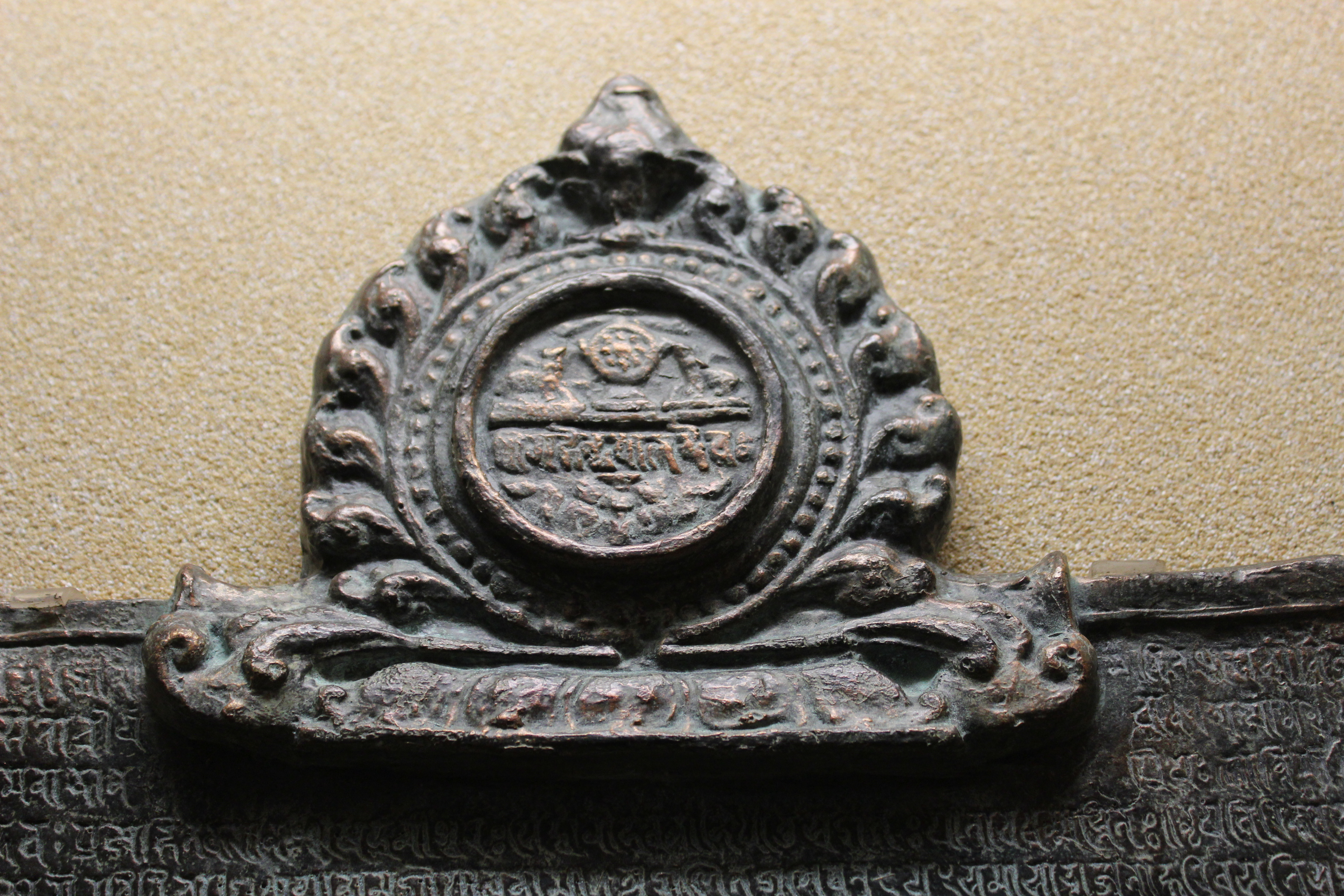
- Imperial seal (845–860 CE)

Details
- Style: His Imperial Majesty
- First monarch: Gopala I
- Last monarch: Govindapala
- Formed: 750 CE (1275–1276 years ago)
- Abolished: 1161 CE (864–865 years ago)
- Residences: Varendra; Gauda; Monghyr
- Appointer: Hereditary

The Pala dynasty (Sanskrit: पाल राजवंश IAST: Pāla rājavaṅśa) was a Medieval Indian Buddhist Dynasty founded by Gopala I that ruled the Pala Empire of Bengal which lasted from 750 CE to 1161 CE. The Pala Emperors assumed the title Gaudeswar which is known from their inscriptions.

== List of Pala Emperors ==
Earlier historians like R.D. Banerji, B.C. Sen, R.C. Majumdar, Atul Roy, Niharranjan Roy, D.C. Sicar and others were unaware about the existence of some Pala Emperors because inscriptions of those kings were undiscovered. G. Laha (2017) has reconstructed the chronology and genealogy of the Pala Emperors based on latest inscriptional discoveries and comparative studies of the predecessors:

Titular Name	Titles	Reign	Regnal year
Gopala I	Maharajadhiraja	c. 750–768 CE	18
Dharmapala	Sriman; Paramesvara; Paramabhattaraka; Maharajadhiraja	c. 768–800 CE	32
Devapala	Sriman; Paramasaugata; Paramesvara; Paramabhattaraka; Maharajadhiraja	c. 800–839 CE	39
Mahendrapala	Paramasaugata; Paramesvara; Paramabhattaraka; Maharajadhiraja	c. 839–854 CE	15
Shurapala I	Gaudeswar	c. 854–866 CE	12
Gopala II	Gaudeswar	c. 866–870 CE	4
Vigrahapala I	Gaudeswar	c. 870–871 CE	1
Narayanapala	Gaudeswar	c. 871–925 CE	54
Rajyapala	Gaudeswar	c. 925–962 CE	37
Gopala III	Gaudeswar	c. 962–973 CE	11
Vigrahapala II	Gaudeswar	c. 973–978 CE	5
Mahipala I	Sriman; Paramasaugata; Paramesvara; Paramabhattaraka; Maharajadhiraja; Pravardhamana	c. 978–1026 CE	48
Nayapala	Gaudeswar	c. 1026–1041 CE	15
Vigrahapala III	Gaudeswar	c. 1041–1067 CE	26
Mahipala II	Gaudeswar	c. 1067–1068 CE	1
Shurapala II	Gaudeswar	c. 1068–1069 CE	1
Ramapala	Gaudeswar	c. 1069–1122 CE	53
Kumarapala	Gaudeswar	c. 1122–1124 CE	2
Gopala IV	Gaudeswar	c. 1124–1139 CE	15
Madanapala	Gaudeswar	c. 1139–1161 CE	22
Govindapala	Gaudeswar	c. 1161–1165 CE	4
Palapala (Disputed king)	Gaudeswar	c. 1165–1200 CE	35

== Family tree ==
Pala dynasty

Gopala I^{(1)} r. c. 8th Century
Dharmapala^{(2)} r. c. 8th–9th Century	Vakapala
Devapala^{(3)} r. c. 9th Century	Jayapala
Mahendrapala^{(4)} r. c. 839–854	Shurapala I^{(5)} r. c. 854–866	Vigrahapala I^{(7)} r. c. 870–871
Gopala II^{(6)} r. c. 866–870	Narayanapala^{(8)} r. c. 871–925
Rajyapala^{(9)} r. c. 925–962
Gopala III^{(10)} r. c. 962–973
Vigrahapala II^{(11)} r. c. 973–978
Mahipala^{(12)} r. c. 978–1026
Nayapala^{(13)} r. c. 1026–1041
Vigrahapala III^{(14)} r. c. 1041–1067
Mahipala II^{(15)} r. c. 1067-1068	Shurapala II^{(16)} r. c. 1068–1069	Ramapala^{(17)} r. c. 1069–1122
Kumarapala^{(18)} r. c. 1122–1124	Madanapala^{(20)} r. c. 1139–1161
Gopala IV^{(19)} r. c. 1124-1139	Govindapala^{(21)} r. c. 1161-1165
