= Durlabharaja I =

King of Sapadalaksha from 784 to 809

King of Sapadalaksha
- Reign: c. 784–809
- Predecessor: Gopendraraja
- Successor: Govindaraja I
- Died: 809
- Dynasty: Chahamanas of Shakambhari
- Father: Chandraraja I

Durlabha-rāja I (r. c. 784-809 CE) was an Indian ruler belonging to the Chahamana dynasty. He ruled parts of present-day Rajasthan in north-western India as a vassal of the Gurjara-Pratihara king Vatsaraja.

== Early life ==
Durlabha was the son of the Chahamana king Chandraraja I, and succeeded his uncle (Chandraraja's brother) Gopendraraja.

== Gauda campaign ==
Historical evidence suggests that Durlabha achieved military success against the Pala Empire of present-day Bengal, as a vassal of the Gurjara-Pratihara king Vatsaraja.

The Prithviraja Vijaya states that Durlabha's sword bathed in Ganga-sagara (presumably the confluence of the Ganga river and the ocean), and tasted the sweet juice of Gauda. This refers to Durlabha's military achievements in the Gauda region. Durlabha's son Guvaka is known to have been a vassal of the Gurjara-Pratihara king Nagabhata II. This suggests that Durlabha was also a feudatory of the Pratiharas, most probably that of Nagabhata's father Vatsaraja. This theory is supported by the Radhanpur Plate Inscription, which refers to Vatsaraja's successful military campaign in the Gauda region.

Durlabha appears to have achieved his victories in Gauda during Vatsaraja's campaign against the Pala king Dharmapala. The Palas came into conflict from time to time with the Pratiharas. The 812 CE Baroda Inscription also refers to Nagabhata's victory over the Gauda king Dharmapala.

Historian R. C. Majumdar theorizes that "Gauda" here refers to the Ganga-Yamuna Doab in present-day Uttar Pradesh. Other historians, such as Dasharatha Sharma and Rima Hooja, identify it with the Gauda region in Bengal, which was the core Pala territory.

According to the Radhanpur inscription Dharmapala, was deprived of his two white royal umbrellas, and fled, pursued by the Pratihara forces. The inscription suggests that through vigorous campaigning, Vatsraja extended his dominions to include a large part of northern India, from the Thar Desert in the west up to the frontiers of bengal in the east.

Both Vatsaraja and Dharmapala were later subdued by the Rashtrakuta king Dhruva. As Dhruva died in 793, Durlabha's military successes in Gauda can be dated before this year.

Durlabharaja's daughter, Mahata Devi, was married to Dharmapala's son Devapala, the emperor of Pala dynasty. She was mother to two subsequent Pala emperors, Mahendrapala and Shurapala I.

== Successor ==
Durlabha was succeeded by his son Govindaraja I alias Guvaka.
