= Devapala of Bengal =

Pala emperor of early 9th century

Devapala
- Paramasaugata; Paramesvara; Paramabhattaraka; Maharajadhiraja

Pala Emperor
- Tenure: 815–850 CE
- Predecessor: Dharamapala
- Successor: Mahendrapala
- Spouse: Mahata Devi, daughter of Durlabharaja I of Chahamana dynasty
- Issue: Rajyapala; Mahendrapala; Shurapala I
- Dynasty: Pala
- Father: Dharamapala
- Mother: Rannadevi
- Religion: Buddhism

Devapāla (c. 9th century) was a great Bengali emperor and the successor of Dharmapala and the third emperor of the Pala Empire. During his reign, the Pāla Empire reached the height of its territorial extent and prosperity. He was known to be the Overlord of Aryavarta.

== Reign ==
Devapala was the third king in the line, and had succeeded his father Dharamapala. His mother was Rannadevi, a Rashtrakuta princess. Earlier historians considered Devapala as a nephew of Dharmapala, based on the Bhagalpur copper plate of Narayanapala, which mentions Devapala as Jayapala's purvajabhrata (interpreted as "elder brother"). Jayapala is mentioned as the son of Dharmapala's brother Vakpala in multiple Pala inscriptions. However, the discovery of the Munger (Monghyr) copper inscription changed this view. This particular inscription clearly describes Devapala as the son of Dharmapala.

Based on the different interpretations of the various epigraphs and historical records, the different historians estimate Devapala's reign as follows:

Historian	Estimate of reign
RC Majumdar (1971)	810-850
AM Chowdhury (1967)	821–861
BP Sinha (1977)	820–860
DC Sircar (1975–76)	812–850

== Military campaigns ==
Devapala is credited by Taranatha for subjugating the whole Northern India from the Himalayas to the Vindhyan Mountains.

The Badal Pillar Inscription of Narayanapala describes the campaigns led by Devapala as:

Lord of Gauda (Devapala) ruled the sea-girt earth, having eradicated the race of the Utkalas, humbled the pride of the Hūņas and scattered the conceit of the rulers of the Dravidas and the Gurjaras.

— Badal Inscription

According to Nitish K. Sengupta, the Badal Pillar inscription is highly exaggerated. Bindeshwari Prasad Sinha, an Indian archaeologist and historian states that some exaggerations are naturally present in praises like those found in the Badal Pillar inscription of Narayanapala, but it is equally unreasonable to dismiss the entire description of Devapāla's conquests as mere bombast. Both Pramode Lal Paul and Ratikanta Tripathi state that the statement in the Badal Pillar inscription that by the wise counsel and policy of his minister the whole tract between the Vindhya and Himalayan ranges, and the east and west seas paid tribute to Devapāla was not merely a political exaggeration in the Badal inscription, but a fact.

The Monghyr Plates praises him for Digvijaya of the entire Bharatavarṣa while the Badal Pillar only mentions his Digvijaya of Aryavarta. Gurjaras, Utkalas, Hunas, Dravidas, Kambojas and Pargiyotisas were subjugated according to his inscriptions.

=== Conquest of Pragjyotisha (Assam) and Utkala (Odisha) ===
Devapala launched military campaigns under his cousin and general Jayapala, who was the son of Dharmapala's younger brother Vakpala. According to Bhagalpur copper-plate, the expedition resulted in the invasion of Pragjyotisha (present-day Assam) where the king of Mlechchha dynasty submitted without a fight and accepted the suzerainty of Devapala. According to the Bādal Pillar Inscription of Narayanapala, Utkala (present-day Odisha) was exerminated and its ruler fled from his capital.

=== Campaigns in South India ===
"Dravida" is generally believed to be a reference to the Rashtrakutas (led by Amoghavarsha), but RC Majumdar believes that it may refer to the Pandyan king Sri Mara Sri Vallabha. However, there is no definitive record of any expedition of Devapala to the extreme south. In any case, his victory in South India could only have been a temporary one, and his dominion lay mainly in the north.

=== Conflict against Tibetan Empire ===
Devapāla is said to have reached and subjected the Kambhoja country (Tibet) in his military campaign. As a result, Devapāla came into conflict with the Tibetan Empire. This is very much possible as the Tibetan sources claim that their kings Khri-srong-lda-btsan and his son Mu-teg-btsan-po lost against Dharmapāla and they were forced to submit. Therefore, Devapāla must have clashed with and defeated the Tibetan kings.

==== Invasion of the Himalayas ====
The inscription of Devapāla states that he liberated the entire Himalayas from the Tibetans. The Tibetan control of the Himalayas was lost during the period of 839-848 A.D. (During Devapāla's reign), as per the Chinese historical records.

=== Campaigns in North India ===
==== Devapala's conflict with the Pratihara Empire under Nagabhata II ====
After the death of Dharmapala, Nagabhata II tried to assert his power and he may have obtained some success. However, Devapāla soon re-established Pala supremacy after his victory against the Pratiharas.

==== Devapala's conflict with Ramabhadra ====
Ramabhadra is credited with no victory in the Pratihara inscription, which states that he ''had no desire for the world.'' Majumdar has interpreted the Gwalior Praśasti to indicate that Ramabhadra's dominion was invaded by the Pala king Devapāla. This invasion have led to serious disturbances in the Pratihara dominion. Ramabhadra suffered heavy setbacks at the hands of Devapāla, who even temporarily ravaged his dominion.

==== Devapala's conflict with Mihira Bhoja ====
Devapāla's own inscriptions, as well as the inscription referring to his reign, state that he subjugated Gurjaras, Utkalas, Hunas, Dravidas, Kambojas, and Pragjyotisas. His victory over the Gurjaras specifically refers to the Pratiharas, with the Pratihara king in this case being Bhoja I.

== Religious leanings ==
Like his father Devapala was a staunch sponsor of Buddhism, and approved the construction of many Buddhist temples and monasteries in Magadha. He maintained the famous Buddhist monastery at Uddandapura (Odantapuri). Buton Rinchen Drub credits his father Dharmapala for building the monastery, although other Tibetan accounts such as that of Taranatha, state that it was magically built and then entrusted to Devapala.

== Relations of Sailendra Dynasty and Pala Empire ==
Balaputradeva, the Sailendra king of Java, sent an ambassador to him, asking for a grant of five villages for the construction of a monastery at Nalanda. The request was granted by Devapala. King Devapala granted five villages were Nandivanāka, Maņivāțaka, Națikā, Hasti and Pālāmaka to Nalanda University. He also patronized the Vikramashila University and the Nalanda University. Devapāla patron of Buddhism, supporting esoteric practices and scholars like Haribhadra and Buddhajñānapāda. His contributions include founding major monastic centers such as Somapura, Vikramaśīla, and Odantāpura, along with numerous Buddhist monuments in eastern India.

Buddhist scholar Vajradatta (the author of Lokesvarashataka), was the court poet of Devapala.

== Successor ==
Devapala ruled for approximately 40 years. His oldest son probably was the Crown Prince (Yuvaraja) Rajyapala. However, he probably died before his father. Earlier, the historians believed his successor to be Shurapala I and/or Vigrahapala I. In the 2000s, a copper-plate grant was discovered at Jagjivanpur: this plate mentions that a hitherto unknown Pala king, Mahendrapala, had issued the grant in 854 CE. Mahendrapala was the son of Devapala and brother of Shurapala I. Both Mahendrapala and Shurapala I were born to Queen Mahata.

== In popular culture ==
Devapala's exploits—both verified and legendary—inspired form part of the Dynasties of India, the 2022 expansion pack for Age of Empires II: Definitive Edition.

== See also ==
- List of rulers of Bengal
