= Gopala I =

8th century founder of Indian Pala Dynasty

Gopala

Pala Emperor
- Reign: c. 750–768 CE
- Predecessor: position established
- Successor: Dharmapala
- Spouse: Dedda-devi of the Bhadra dynasty
- Issue: Dharmapala; Vakpala
- Dynasty: Pala
- Father: Vapyata

Gopala I (r. c. 750–768 CE) was the founder of the Pala dynasty, which was based in the Bengal region of the Indian subcontinent. He rose to power after being elected by a group of regional chieftains and officials.

== Family background ==
No inscriptions issued during Gopala's reign have been discovered: he is known from the later literary references and genealogies in inscriptions.

The Rama-charita (12th century), written at the Pala court, states that the Varendra region in northern Bengal was the fatherland of the Pala dynasty. According to the Aṣṭasāhasrikā Prajñāpāramitā Sūtra (8th century) of Hari-bhadra, Gopala was born in the family of a famous man called Raja-bhata. (Note: Some writers speculate that Gopala's ancestor Raja-bhata was same as the Khadga king Raja-bhatta.) According to the Khalimpur inscription, Gopala's grand-father Dayita-vishnu was a highly educated man (sarva-vidyavadata), and his father Vapyata was a khanditarati ("killer of enemies"), that is, a warrior.

The Pala inscriptions do not mention Gopala's caste. The Mañjuśrī-mūla-kalpa (8th century) describes Gopala as a man from a menial caste (dasa-jivinah), implying that he was a Shudra. Several other sources suggest that Palas came from a low-status background. (Note: Ghanarama's Dharma-mangala (16th century) describes the Palas as "low born". The Ballala-charita (16th-century) describes the Palas as "low" Kshatriyas. Pala's supposed relationship with the Kaivartas or Mahishyas also suggests that the family originally held a lower social status. The Rama-charita suggests that the Kaivarta rebel Divyoka was a relative of the Pala royal family. The Mahishyas, a traditionally agrarian caste, claim Divyoka as a member of their caste. The descendants of rulers of Sarbeswar, which claimed descent from the Palas, also identify as Mahishyas. These evidences have led some scholars to theorize that the Palas belonged to the Kaivarta or Mahishya caste.)

After becoming politically powerful, the Palas appear to have started claiming high-class Kshatriya origin. Soddhala's Udaya-sundari-katha (11th century) states that Gopala belonged to the lineage (vamsa) of Mandhatri, a king of the legendary solar dynasty. Taranatha (16th century) states that Gopala was born to a Kshatirya woman and a tree god in Paundra-vardhana. Gopala's successors have also been characterized as Kshatriyas in the later records. (Note: The 1142 CE Kamauli inscription of the Kamarupa ruler Vaidya-deva describes the Pala king Vigraha-pala III as a member of the solar dynasty. The Rama-charita similarly calls the contemporary king Rama-pala (r. 1077–1130 CE) a Kshatriya, and describes the family as samudra-kula, implying descent from the god of ocean.)

Scholar H. S. Kotiyal notes the records that describe the Pala kings as Kshatriyas are of later date than the Mañjuśrī-mūla-kalpa, which suggests they were Shudras. Kotiyal therefore theorizes that the Gopala was born in a Shudra family, and his descendants started claiming Kshatriya status only after becoming powerful.

The Ain-i-Akbari (16th century) calls Gopala a Kayastha.

== Ascension ==
After the decline of the Chandra dynasty, the Bengal region suffered from general lawlessness. The Khalimpur inscription (early 9th century) of Gopala's son Dharma-pala, describes this situation as matsya-nyaya ("law of fish", where the big fish eat the small fish).

Matsyanyayam apakitum prakritibhir Lakshmiya karam grahitah Sri Gopala iti kshitisa-sirsam chudamani-tatsubha
[To put an end to the state of affairs similar to what happens among fishes, the prakriti made the glorious Gopala, the crest jewel of the heads of kings, take the hand of Lakshmi, the goddess of fortune]

— Khalimpur copper-plate inscription of Dharmapala

The Khalimpur inscription states that the prakriti made Gopala the king under these circumstances. While the term prakriti refers to a general body of people, historians suggest that this does not refer to Gopala's election by the general public: instead, a few chiefs and officials likely helped him acquire power. Such elections were quite common in contemporary tribal societies of the region.

Taranatha (16th century) claims that after the Bengal ("Bhangala") had been without a king for several years, the local leaders elected a king, but the Naga queen of a former king killed him. Over the next few years, the leaders elected several other kings but the Naga woman killed all of them. One day, a devotee of the goddess Chunda saw a family grieving because their son had been elected as the king, and they were afraid of losing him to the Naga woman. The devotee offered to take the son's place for money, killed the Naga woman with a club sacred to the goddess, and became the king. The people gave him the name Gopala.

The Mañjuśrī-mūla-kalpa states that people of Bengal elected Bhadra as the ruler after the end of the Gupta rule in Bengal. Bhadra destroyed the "Brahmana feudal lords, recluses of good conduct, and others". Gopala succeeded him as the king.

== Reign ==
Gopal Laha (2017) estimates the reign as c. 750-768 CE based on the latest epigraphic discoveries. Previous scholars have variously dated Gopal's ascension to the period 750-756 CE, based on different interpretations of the various epigraphs and historical records available to them. (Note: Previous estimates of Gopala's reign include 750–770 by RC Majumdar (1971), 756–781 by AM Chowdhury (1967), 755–783 by BP Sinha (1977), and 750–775 by DC Sircar (1975–76).) According to Mañjuśrī-mūla-kalpa, Gopala died at the age of 80, after a reign of 27 years.

The Munger inscription of Deva-pala states that Gopala extended his kingdom up to the sea coast. The Siyan inscription of Naya-pala states that he conquered Samatata in the southern part of Bengal. Taranatha states that Gopala extended his rule to the Magadha region, where he built a vihara at Nalanda.

At the time of his death, Gopala had bequeathed a large kingdom to his son Dharma-pala (770-810 CE). No records are available about the exact boundaries of Gopala's kingdom, but it might have included almost all of the Bengal region (Gaur, Varendra and Banga) and parts of Magadha.

== Religion ==
A few sources written much after Gopala's death mention him as a Buddhist, but it is not known if this is true. For example, Taranatha (1575–1634) claims that Gopala was a staunch Buddhist and a major patron of Buddhism. He also claims that Gopala had built the famous Buddhist monastery at Odantapuri.

== See also ==
- List of rulers of Bengal
- List of Pala emperors
