= Gopendraraja =

King of Sapadalaksha from 771 to 784

King of Sapadalaksha
- Reign: 771–784
- Predecessor: Chandraraja I
- Successor: Durlabharaja I
- Died: 784
- Dynasty: Chahamanas of Shakambhari

Gopendraraja (died 784), also known as Gopendraka, was the king of the Chahamana dynasty from 771 to 784.

Gopendra succeeded his brother Chandraraja I as the Chahamana king. According to Prithviraja Vijaya, their father was Vigraharaja I. The later Hammira Mahakavya, however, states that their father was Vigraharaja's ancestor Naradeva.

The Prabandha-Kosha states that Gopendra defeated one Sultan Beg Varisa in a battle. Historian R. B. Singh theorizes that Beg Varisa might have been a subordinate of the Arab general Muhammad bin Qasim.

Gopendra was succeeded by his nephew Durlabharaja I, who was the son of Chandraraja I.
