= Vigraharaja I =

King of Sapadalaksha
- Reign: c. 734–759 CE
- Predecessor: Ajayaraja I
- Successor: Chandraraja I
- Dynasty: Chahamanas of Shakambhari

Vigraharāja I (r. c. 734–759 CE) was an Indian king from the Chahamana dynasty. He ruled parts of present-day Rajasthan in north-western India. He is also known as Vigrahanṛpa.

Vigraharaja succeeded his father Ajayaraja I as the Chahamana ruler. The Prithviraja Vijaya praises him using conventional eulogies, which indicates that he achieved military successes.

According to Prithviraja Vijaya, Vigraharaja had two sons: Chandraraja and Gopendraraja. He was succeeded by Chandraraja, who in turn was succeeded by Gopendraraja. The later Hammira Mahakavya mentions Chandraraja ("Shri Chandra") as the son of Vigraharaja's ancestor Naradeva.
