= Taragarh Fort =

Taragarh Fort may refer to:

- Taragarh Fort, Ajmer, Rajasthan, India
- Taragarh Fort, a fort in Bundi, Rajasthan, India
