= Chandraraja I =

King of Sapadalaksha
- Reign: c. 759–771 CE
- Predecessor: Vigraharaja I
- Successor: Gopendraraja
- Dynasty: Chahamanas of Shakambhari

Chandraraja I (r. c. 759–771 CE) was an Indian king belonging to the Chahamana dynasty that ruled parts of present-day Rajasthan in north-western India.

According to Prithviraja Vijaya, Chandraraja was a son of his predecessor Vigraharaja I. The later Hammira Mahakavya, however, states that his father was Vigraharaja's ancestor Naradeva.

Chandraraja I was a son of the Chahamana king Vigraharaja I. He was succeeded by his brother Gopendraraja, who in turn was succeeded by Chandraraja's son Durlabharaja I.
