= Mahata Devi =

Pala empress, early 9th century CE

Empress consort of Pala Empire
- Reign: Early 9th century-845
- Predecessor: Rannadevi
- Successor: Manikyadevi

Queen Dowager
- Reign: 845-863
- Issue: Mahendrapala; Shurapala I
- Dynasty: Chahamanas of Shakambhari
- Father: Durlabharaja I
- Religion: Shaivism

Mahata Devi was the empress consort of Devapala, the greatest emperor of Pala dynasty. Her father was Durlabharaja I of Chahamana dynasty.

Mahata Devi probably resided near Jagajjivanpur in Bengal, the place where her son Mahendrapala's copperplate was discovered. The place is still known as 'Rajar Mayer Bari', meaning 'House of the King's mother.

Mahata Devi outlived her husband and elder son. She was alive at least until 863, the 3rd regnal year of her younger son Shurapala I, when she set up a Shivalingam at the celebrated temple of Mahateswara at Varansi, which indicates she was a devout Shaivite despite being married into a Buddhist dynasty. She also gifted two villages to Brahmins, from which it is evident that she had access to sizable land property.

== See also ==
- List of rulers of Bengal
