= Ajayaraja I =

King of Sapadalaksha
- Reign: c. 721–734 CE
- Predecessor: Naradeva
- Successor: Vigraharaja I
- Dynasty: Chahamanas of Shakambhari

Ajayaraja I (r. c. 721–734 CE) was a king belonging to the Chahamana dynasty of Shakambhari (modern Sambhar). He ruled parts of present-day Rajasthan in north-western India. He is also known as Jayaraja, Ajayapala Chakva or Ajayapala Chakri.

== Life ==
Ajayaraja I succeeded Naradeva as the Chahamana king. According to the 12th century chronicle Prithviraja Vijaya, he was a great warrior who defeated several enemies.

According to one theory, Ajayaraja I founded the city of Ajayameru (modern Ajmer). The Prabandha-Kosha states that he commissioned the Ajayameru fort, which later came to be known as the Taragarh Fort of Ajmer. The Akhbar ul-Akhyar calls it the first hill fort of India. However, the Prithviraja Vijaya attributes the establishment of Ajmer to his descendant Ajayaraja II (12th century CE). According to historian R. B. Singh, Ajayaraja I is more likely to be the founder of Ajmer, considering the fact that inscriptions dated to 8th century CE have been found at Ajmer. Singh theorizes that Ajayaraja II later significantly developed the town and moved the kingdom's capital from Shakambhari to Ajmer. Others, such as Shyam Singh Ratnawat and Krishna Gopal Sharma, believe that it was Ajayaraja II who founded Ajmer.

Ajayaraja I was succeeded by his son Vigraharaja I.
