= Gopala II =

Pala emperor from 866 to 870

Pala emperor
- Reign: 866–870 CE
- Predecessor: Shurapala I
- Successor: Vigrahapala I
- Dynasty: Pala
- Father: Shurapala I
- Mother: Manikyadevi
- Religion: Buddhism

Gopala II (r. 866–870) was the successor to the Pala king Shurapala I in the Bengal-Bihar region of the Indian subcontinent, and the sixth ruler of the Pala line reigning for at least four years. The existence of this king came to light when, in 1995, historian Gouriswar Bhattacharya discovered two copper plate inscriptions of a previously unknown Pala king in Los Angeles County Museum of Art, where these had been sent for cleaning by a private collector. This king got designated as Gopala II; consequently, existing Gopala II and Gopala III were re-designated as Gopala III and Gopala IV, respectively. The text of these two inscriptions were subsequently edited by Ryosuke Furui in 2009.

== Life ==
Three copper plate inscriptions of the king have been discovered. One was issued in his third regnal year, the other two (the ones discovered in Los Angeles) on the same date in the fourth regnal year. As per these plates, Gopala II was the son of Shurapala I and grandson of Devapala. His mother's name was Manikyadevi, daughter of the king Avantika and a granddaughter of the king of Tramana. His achievements are so far unknown. Many stone inscriptions, image inscriptions, manuscripts of Buddhist texts etc. were earlier discovered, issued in the reign of a king named Gopala. Which of these are to be assigned to the time of this king is not yet established.

== Re-evaluation of the Pala chronology ==
Before 1970, nothing was known about the three Pala kings (Mahendrapala, Shurapala I and Gopala II) who ruled in between Devapala and Vigrahapala I. Plenty of references, on images, in temples, other stone inscriptions as well as various manuscripts were found, but these were wrongly assigned to times of other kings. The references to Mahendrapala were assigned to the Gurjara-Pratihara king Mahendrapala I and accordingly, the Bihar area of Gauda was thought to have been occupied by the Pratiharas at that time. In Badal village of Dinajpur district, Bangladesh (now in Dhamoirhat sub-district of Naogaon District), there is a pillar called Garuḍa Stambha (colloquially, Bhimer Panti), which contains an inscription of Guravamishra, who had served as Prime Minister to the Pala king Narayanapala. This inscription, known as the Badal Praśasti (Badal Eulogy), sequentially mentions Guravamishra's ancestors, along with the Pala kings they had served as Prime Ministers. Mahendrapala is indirectly mentioned, so that part was assigned to Devapala. The name "Gopala" was deemed to be a reference to Krishna, and the name "Shurapala" was deemed as an alternate name for Vigrahapala I.

Then there came an explosion of new Pala copper plates. The 1970 discovery of the Mirzapur plate of Shurapala I, 1987 discovery of the Jagajjibanpur plate of Mahendrapala and 1995 discovery of the Los Angeles plates of Gopala II have forced a re-evaluation of the Pala chronology. The royal names of the Badal eulogy were re-assessed in 2008 and the names got re-assigned, by historian Suresh Chandra Bhattacharya.

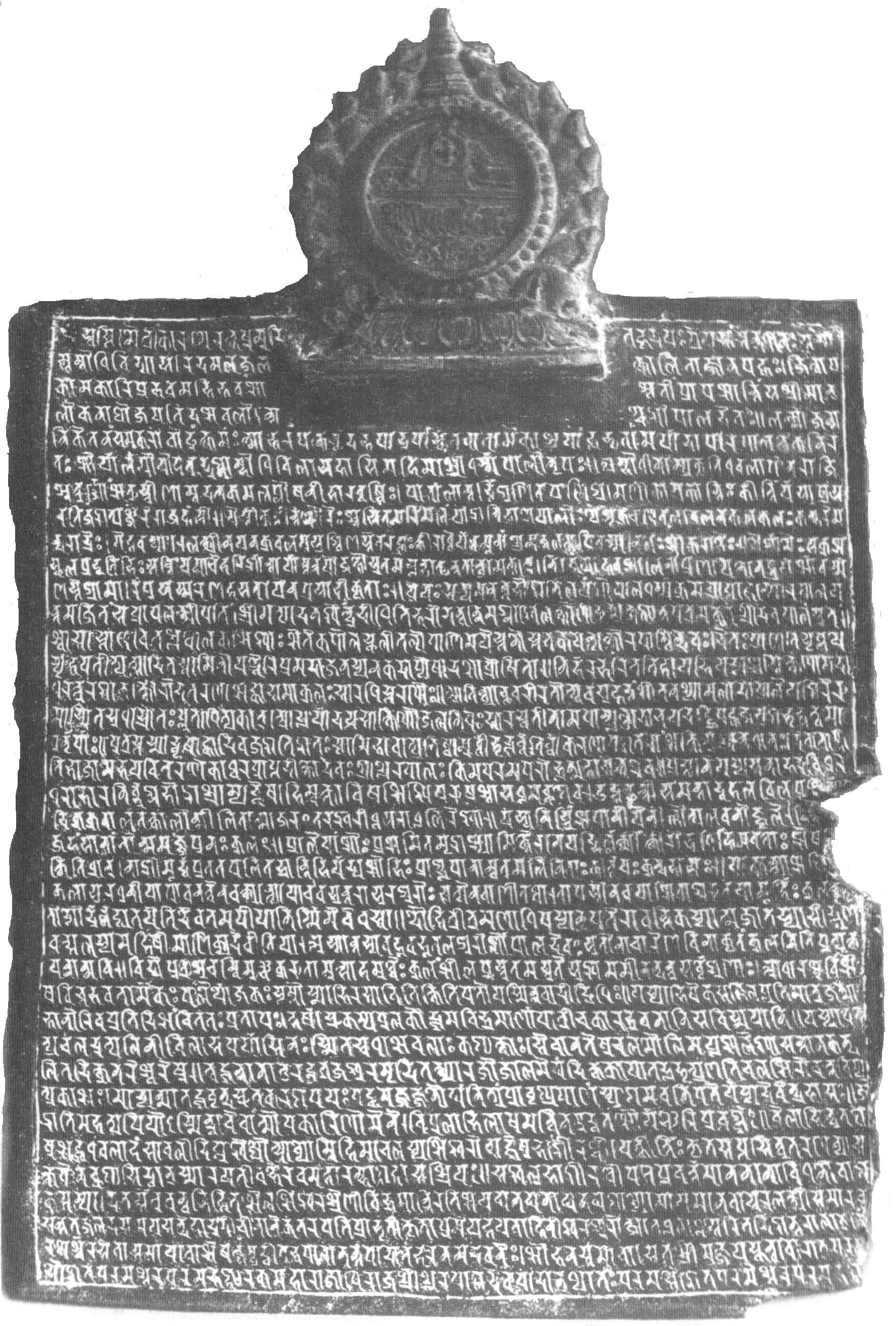
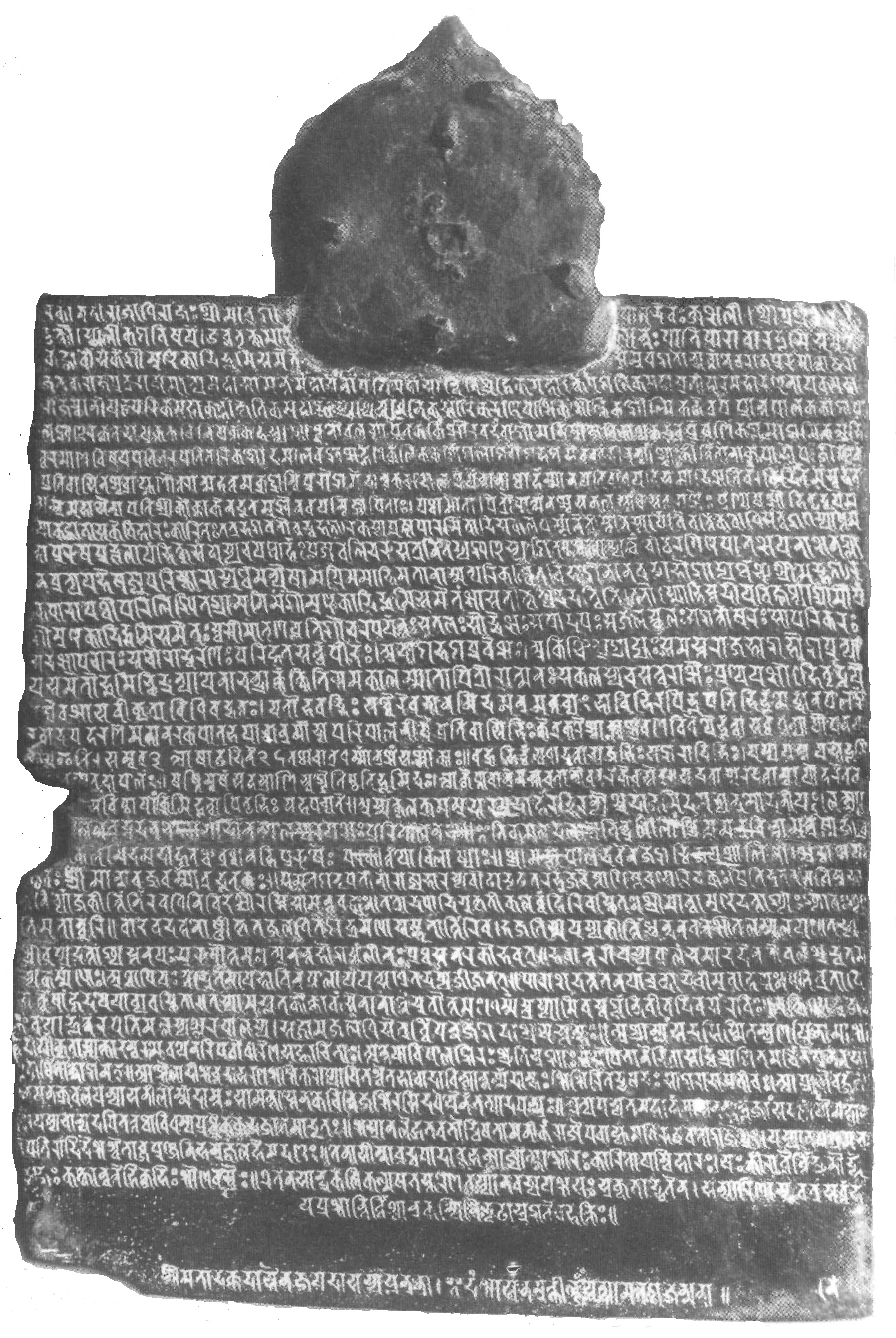
Left:Mohipur copper plate of Gopala II, regnal year 3, obverse., Right:Mohipur copper plate of Gopala II, reverse.

The Pala chronology was adjusted by Gouriswar Bhattacharya in 1998 to accommodate these new kings. Further evidence extended the reigns of Vigrahapala II, Mahipala II and Shurapala II. Chronology could not be adjusted within the existing framework of the total Pala period, the 18th regnal year of Madanapala being known to be 1083 Saka (1161 C.E.) from the Balgudar Narayana image inscription; so Rajat Sanyal back-pushed the starting year of Gopala I (the first Pala king) from 750 C.E. to 741 C.E. There were many conflicts of the Pala kings with their Gurjara-Pratihara, Rashtrakuta and other contemporaries, so the identity of the Pala kings involved in these conflicts were also re-assessed by Sanyal, although this is by no means the final picture.

== See also ==
- List of rulers of Bengal
