= Shurapala I =

Pala Emperor
- Reign: 854-866 CE
- Predecessor: Mahendrapala
- Successor: Gopala II
- Consort: Manikyadevi
- Issue: Gopala II
- Dynasty: Pala
- Father: Devapala
- Mother: Mahata Devi

Shurapala I (also spelt Surapala) was a 9th-century ruler of the Pala Empire, in the Bengal region of the Indian subcontinent. He was the fifth Pala emperor. He ruled for at least 12 years.

== Ancestry ==
Previously, the historians believed that Shurapala and Vigrahapala were the two names of the same person. However, the discovery of a copper plate in 1970 in the Mirzapur district conclusively established that these two were cousins. They either ruled simultaneously (perhaps over different territories) or in rapid succession. If they ruled in succession, it seems more likely that Shurapala preceded Vigrahapala, since Vigrahapala I and his descendants ruled in unbroken succession. Vigrahapala either dethroned Shurapala, or replaced him peacefully in absence of any direct heir to the throne.

Earlier, it was believed that Shurapala and Vigrahapala succeeded Devapala. However, the discovery of a copper plate charter at Jagjivanpur indicates that Shurapala was preceded by Mahendrapala. Both were sons of Devapala and his queen Mahata. According to the Jagjivanpur inscription Shurapala I was Mahendrapala's younger brother and royal envoy.

== Reign ==
Based on the different interpretations of the various epigraphs and historical records, the different historians estimate Shurapala's reign as follows:

Historian	Estimate of reign
RC Majumdar (1971)	850–853 (along with Vigrahapala I)
AM Chowdhury (1967)	861–866 (along with Vigrahapala I)
BP Sinha (1977)	860–865 (along with Vigrahapala I)
DC Sircar (1975–76)	850–858
