= State Archaeological Museum =

Museum in Kolkata India

- Façade of the State Archaeological Museum, Kolkata
- Established: 1962; 64 years ago
- Location: Behala, Kolkata (formerly Calcutta), West Bengal
- Coordinates: 22°29′57.80″N 88°19′04.70″E
- Website: wbtourism.gov.in/museums_of_kolkata

State Archaeological Museum, West Bengal in Kolkata, West Bengal, is an archeological museum founded in 1962 and has collections including rare tools of the Early, Middle and the Late Stone Ages from Susunia (Bankura) and other sites, proto-historic antiquities from Pandu Rajar Dhibi (Burdwan), terracottas, sculptures, stone and stucco from the Gupta, Maurya, Shunga, Kushana, Pala and Medieval times. It is located at the vicinity of Behala Bazar Metro on Diamond Harbour Road and Nafar Chandra Das Road at Behala behind Siddeshwari Kali Temple

There is also a section on ‘Historical Art’ opened in 1963 which displays large number of old terracottas, bronzes, wood-carvings, textiles and manuscripts. Sells several card-sets and other publications; activities include explorations and excavations of historical sites.

The present palatial building was donated by the family of Satyendranath Roy, second son of Rai Bahadur Ambika Charan Roy 1827-1902, especially at the initiative of Rabindranath Roy in the early 1970s.

== Entry fee and timing ==
The museum charges Rs.20 per person as the entry fee. It remains open from Wednesday to Sunday from 11am to 4.30pm.

== Gallery ==
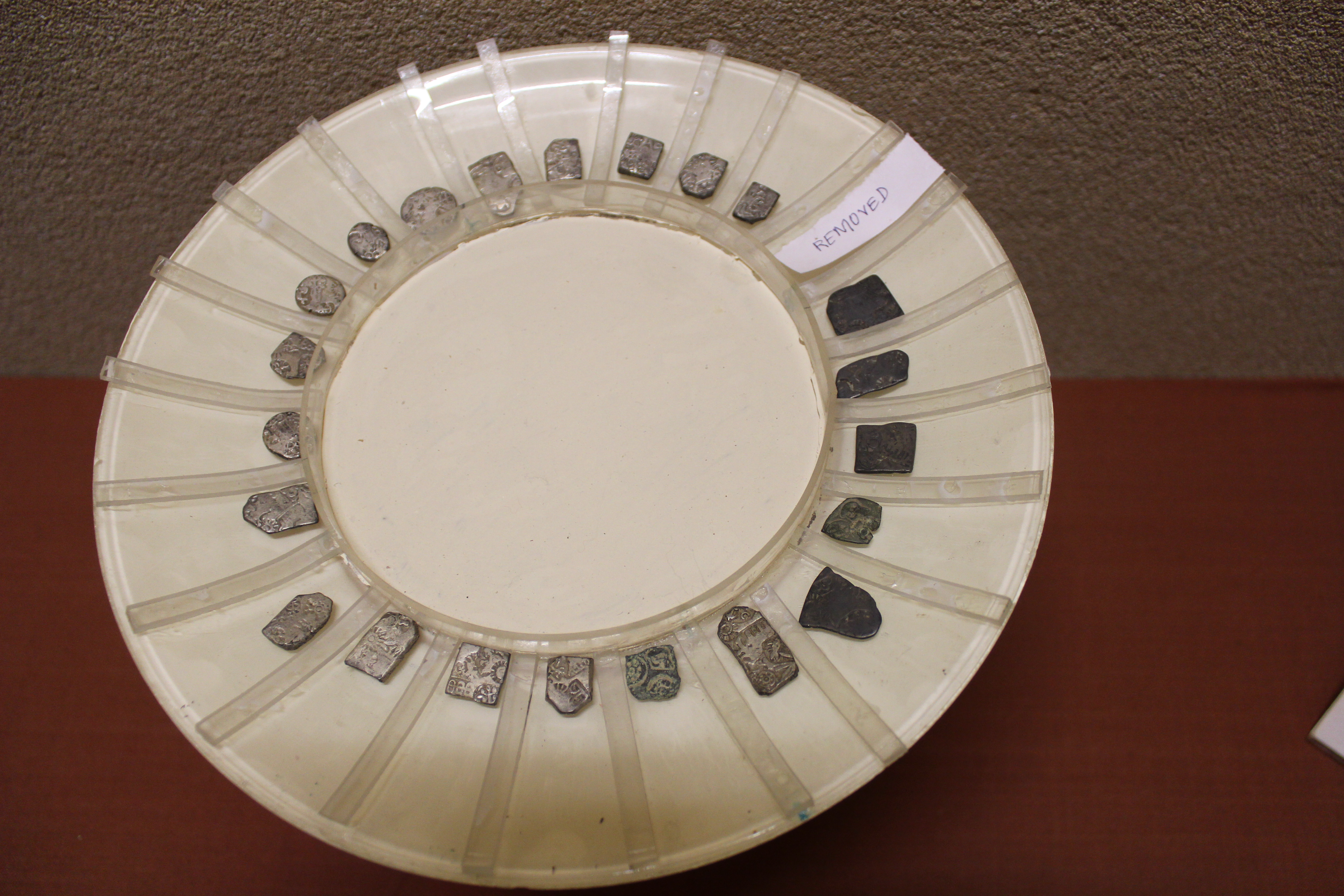
Punch-marked coins discovered from Chandraketugarh.

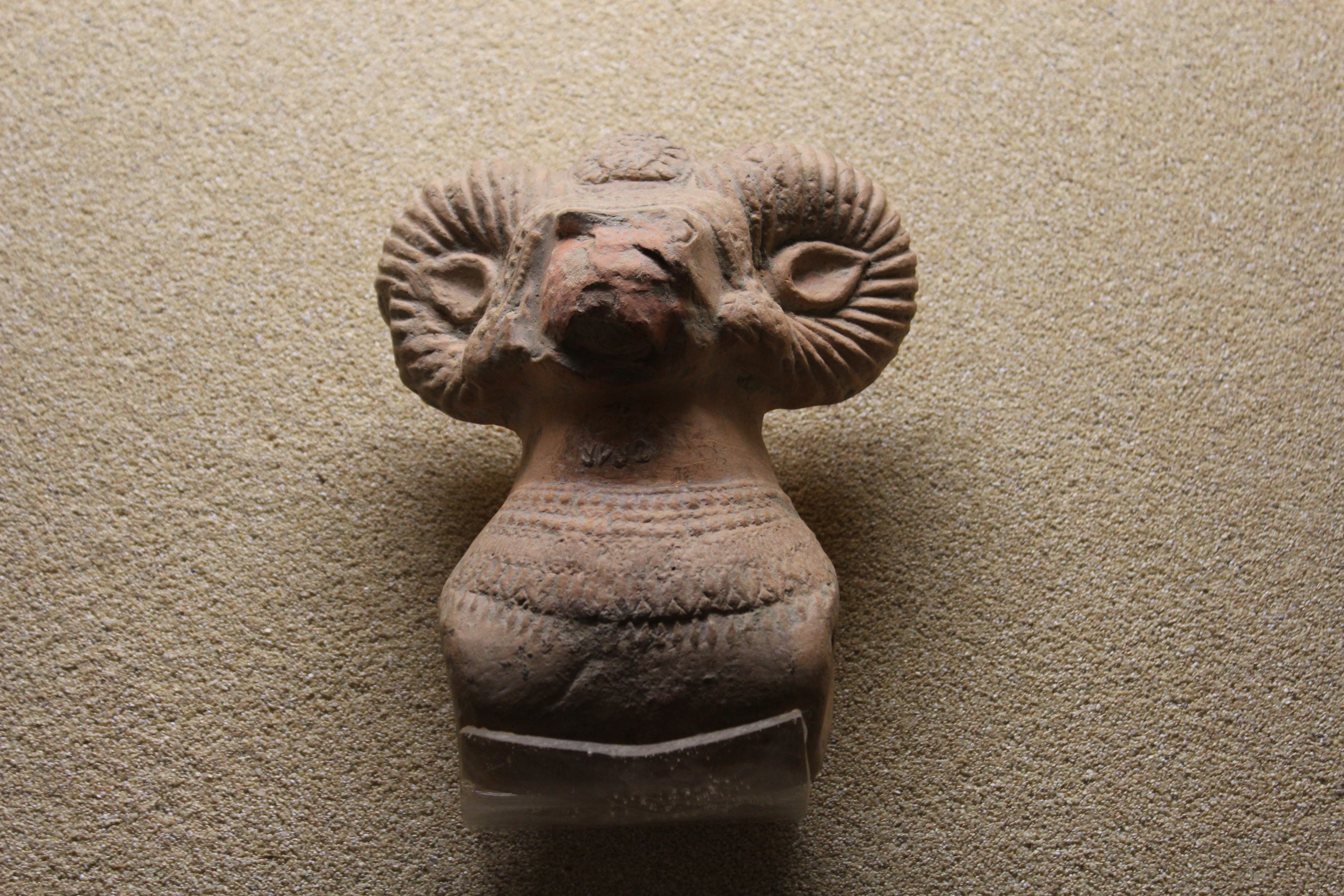
Terracotta sculpture

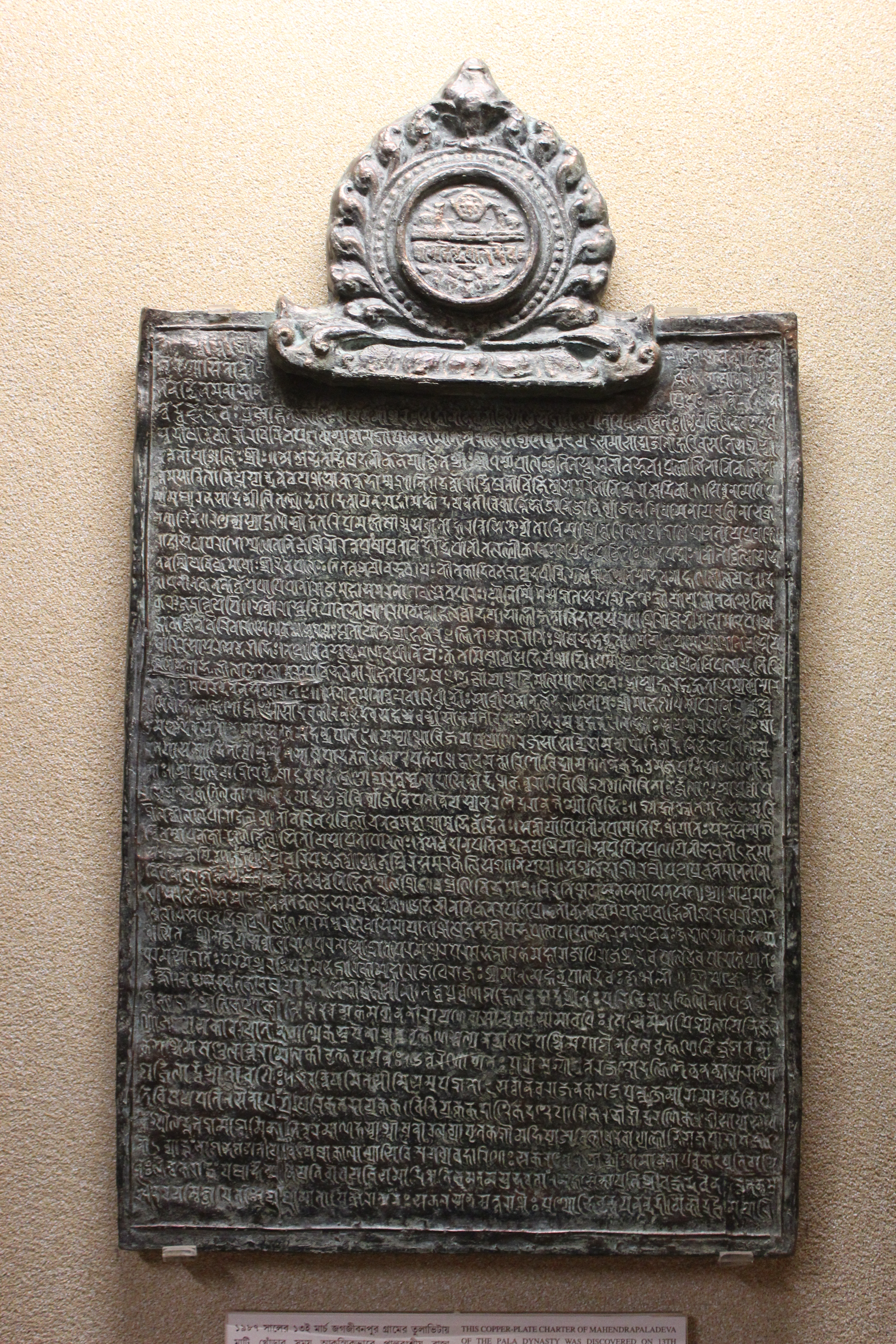
Copper plate inscription of Mahendrapala.

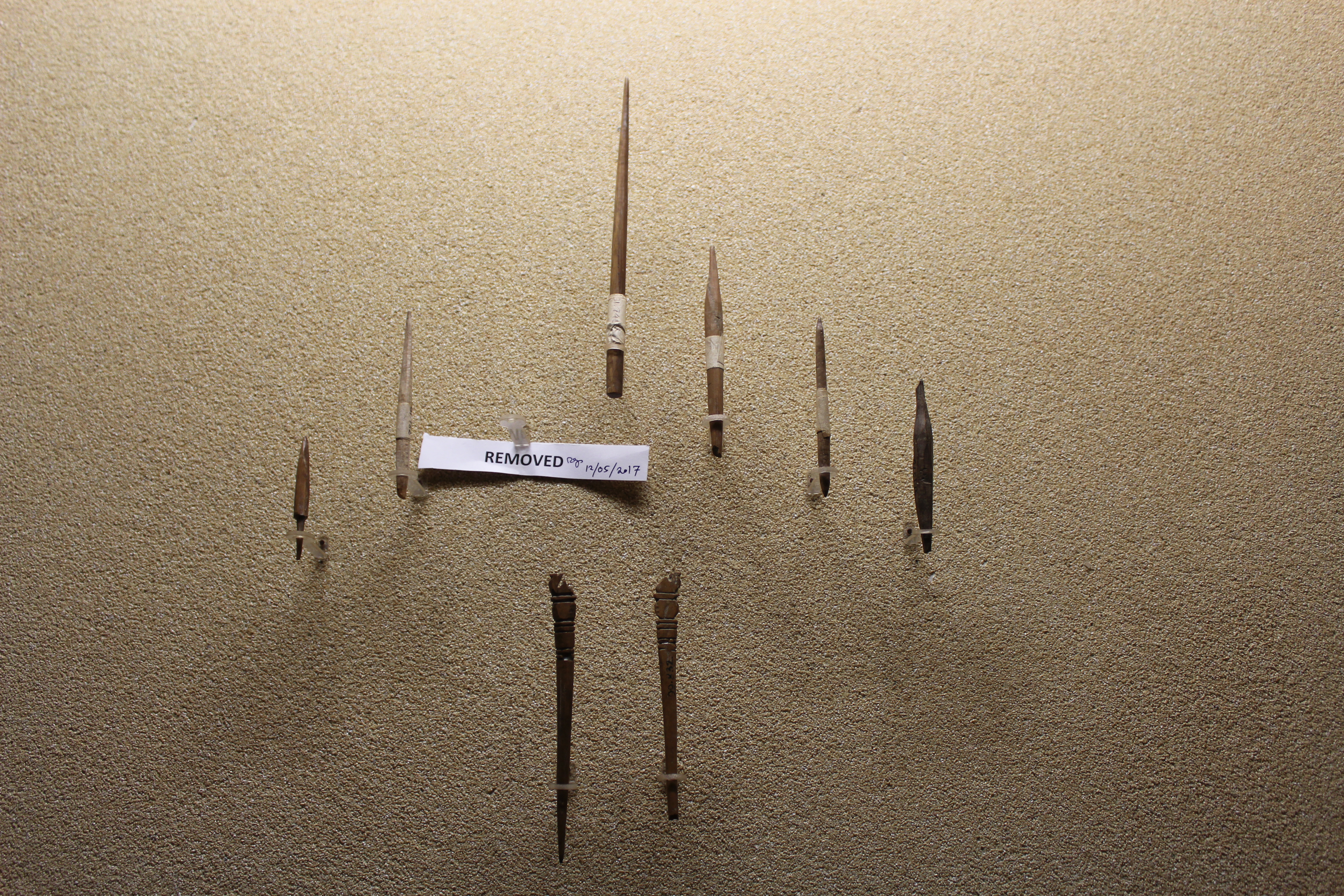
Bone artefacts

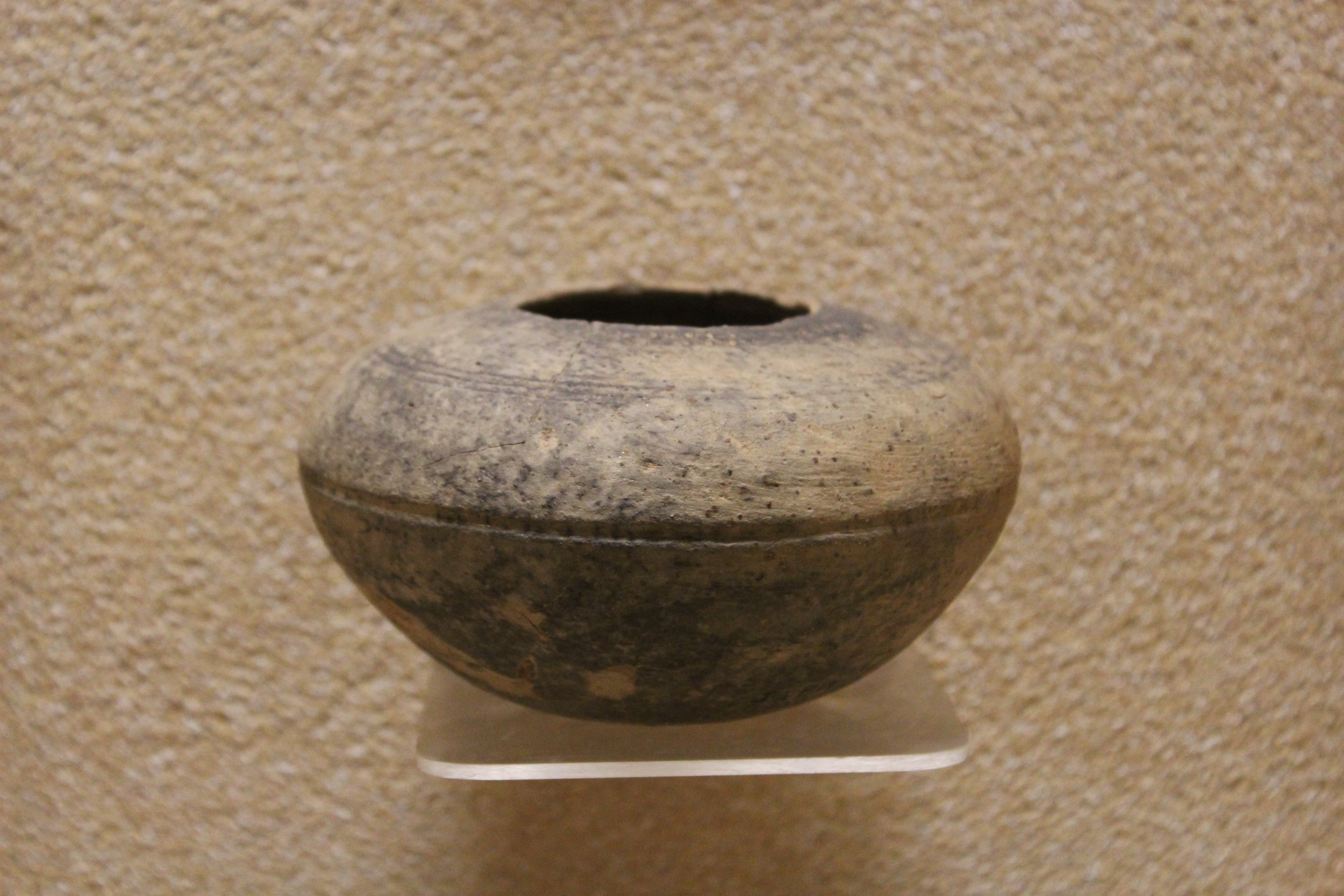
Pottery

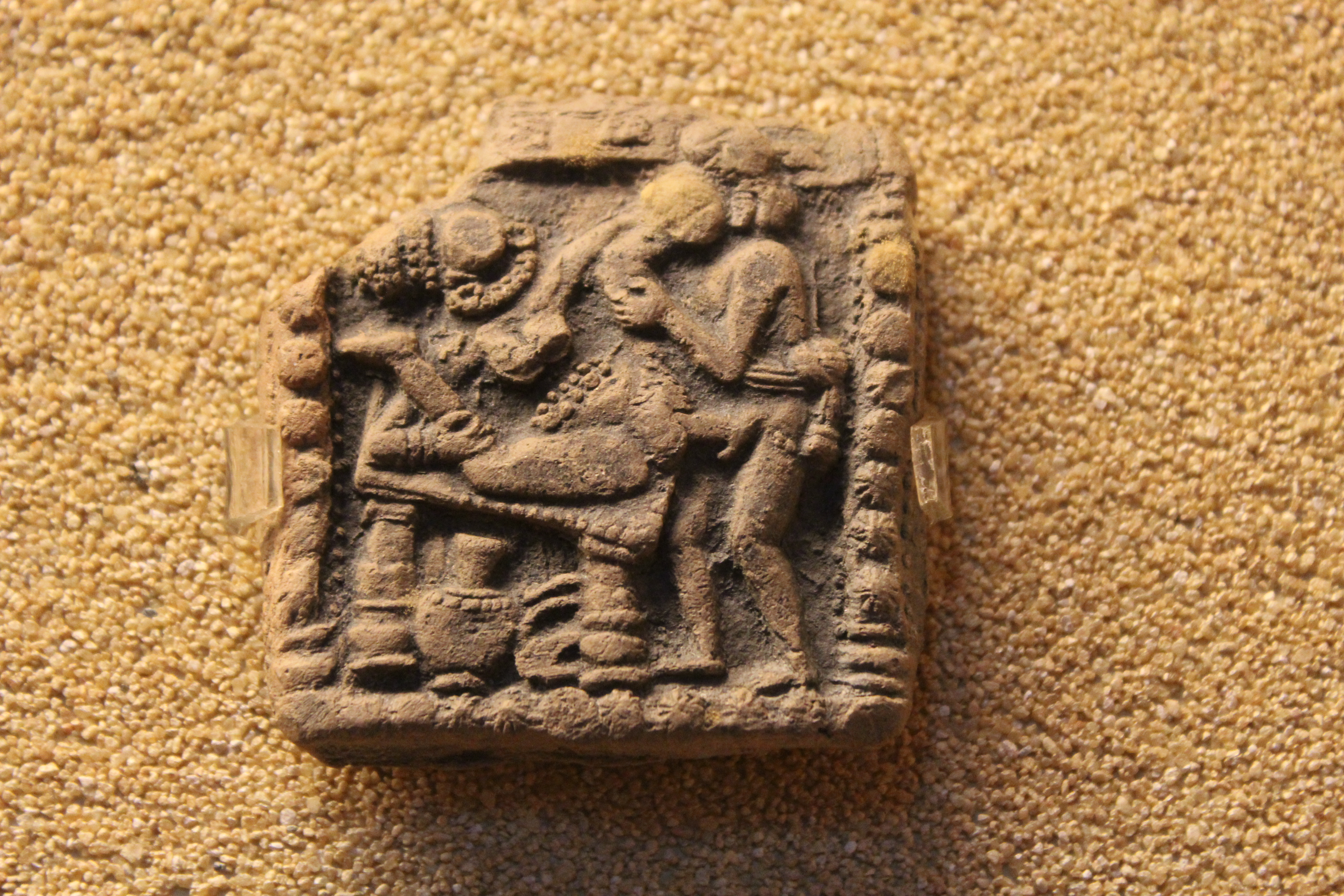
Mithuna, Dampati and Lajjagauri

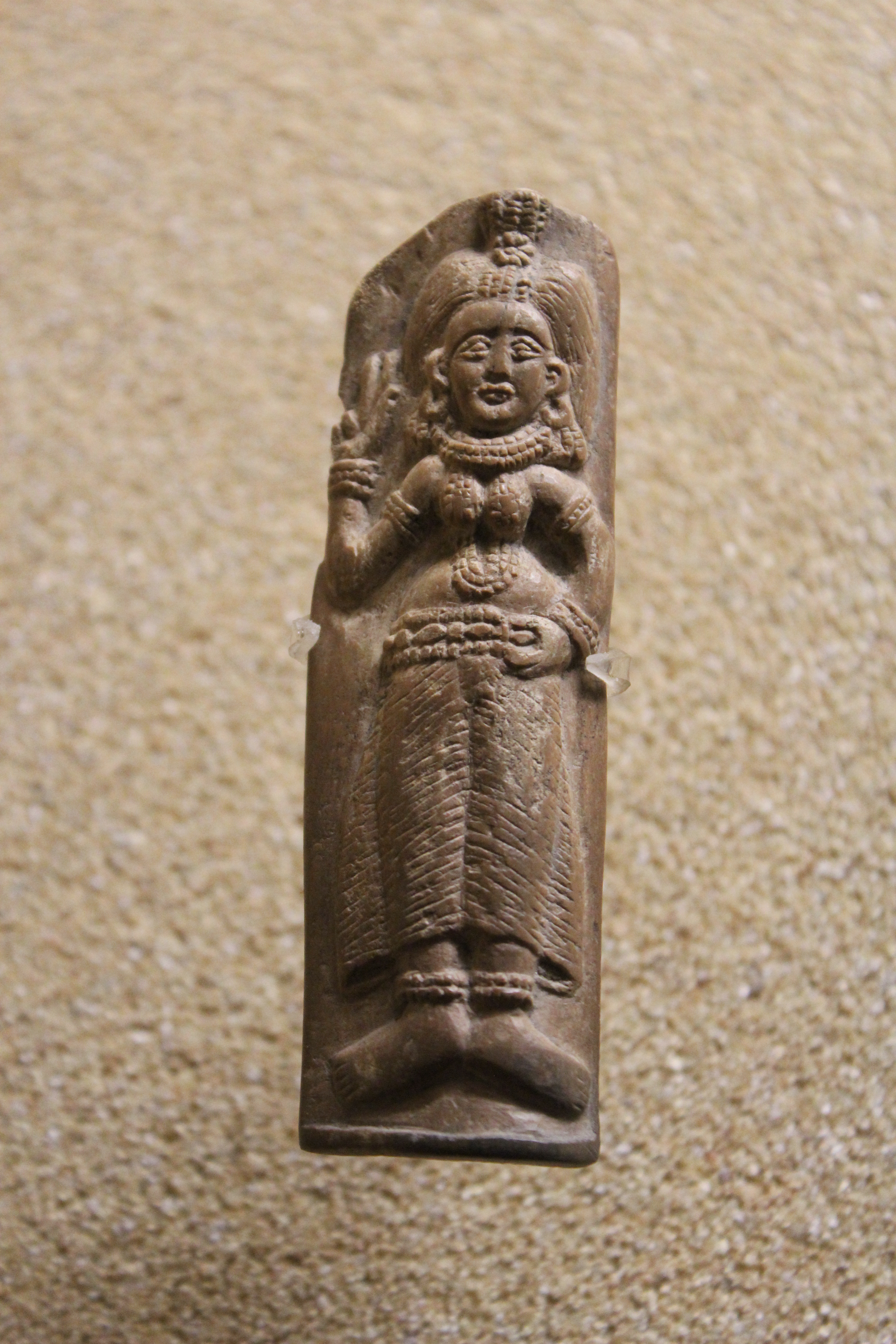
Ivory artefacts

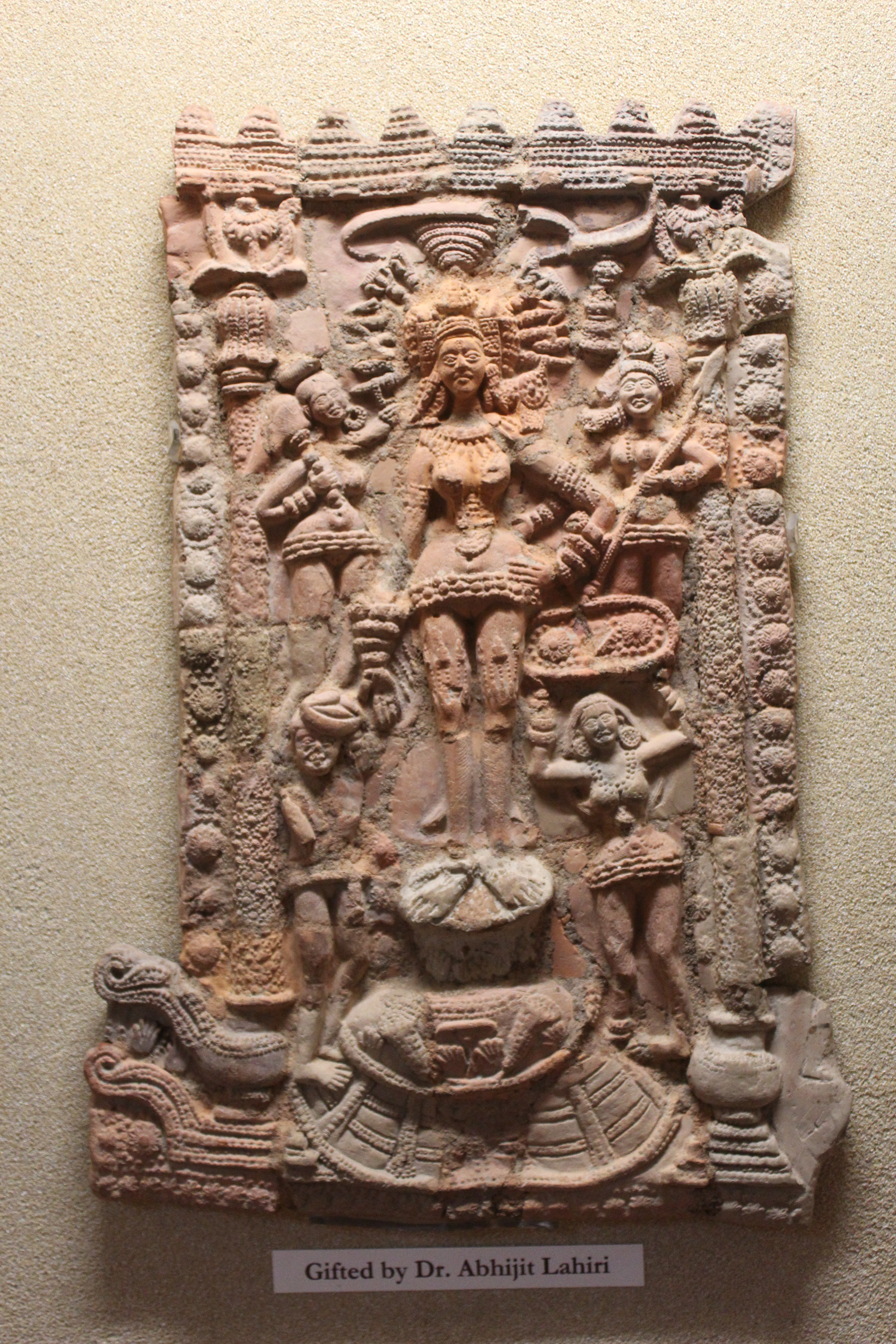
Narrative and social scene, discovered from Chandraketugarh

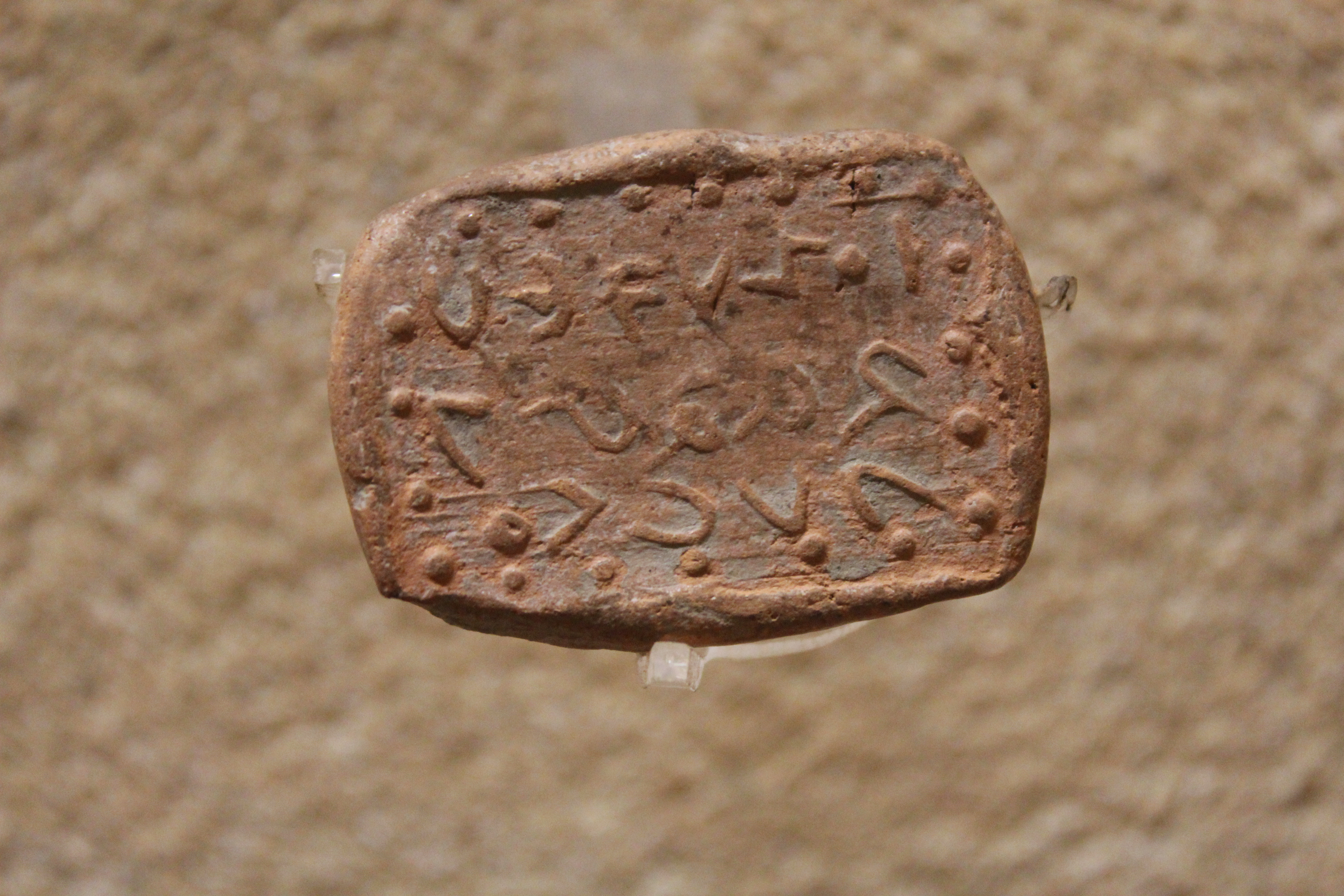
A terracotta seal

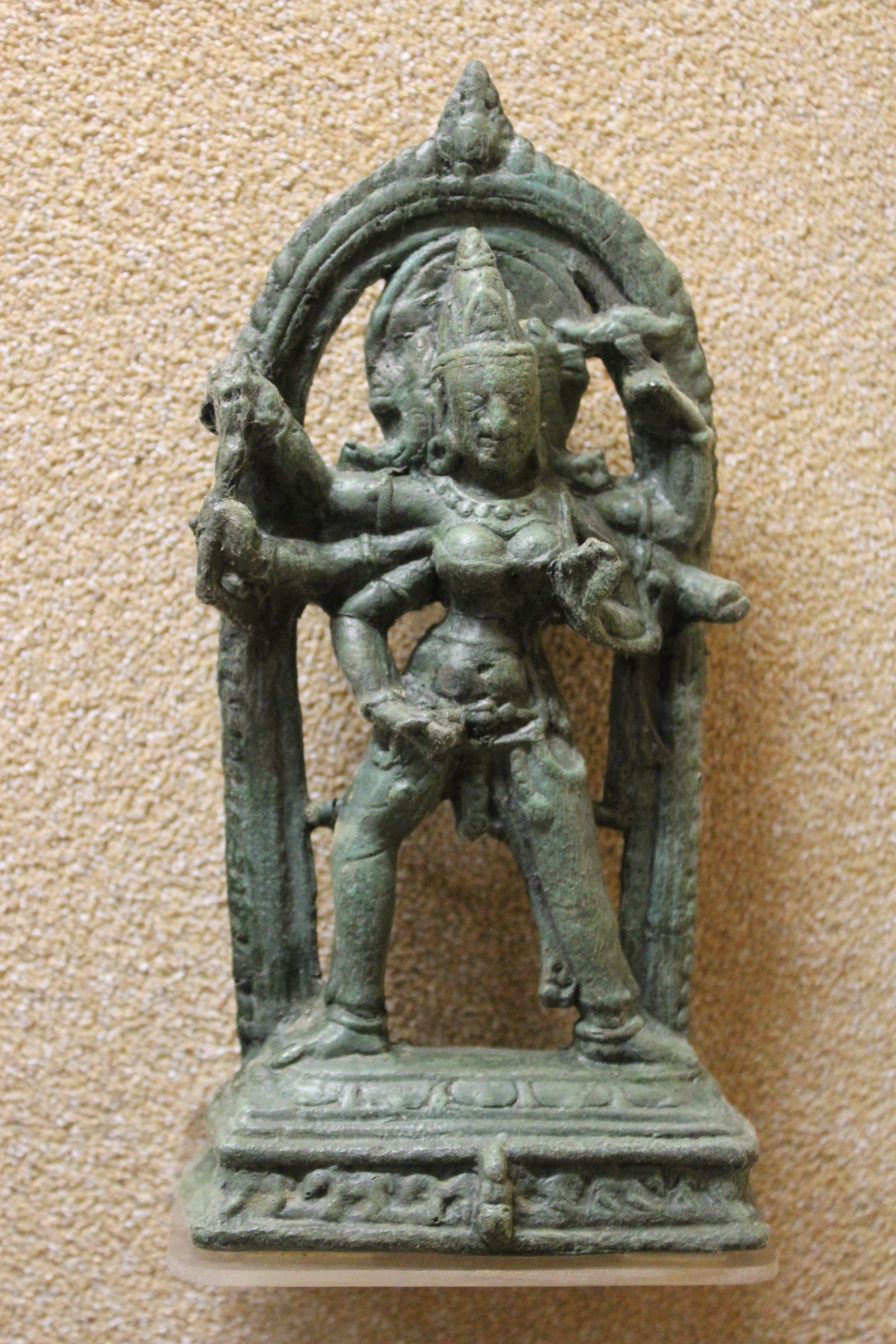
Marichi

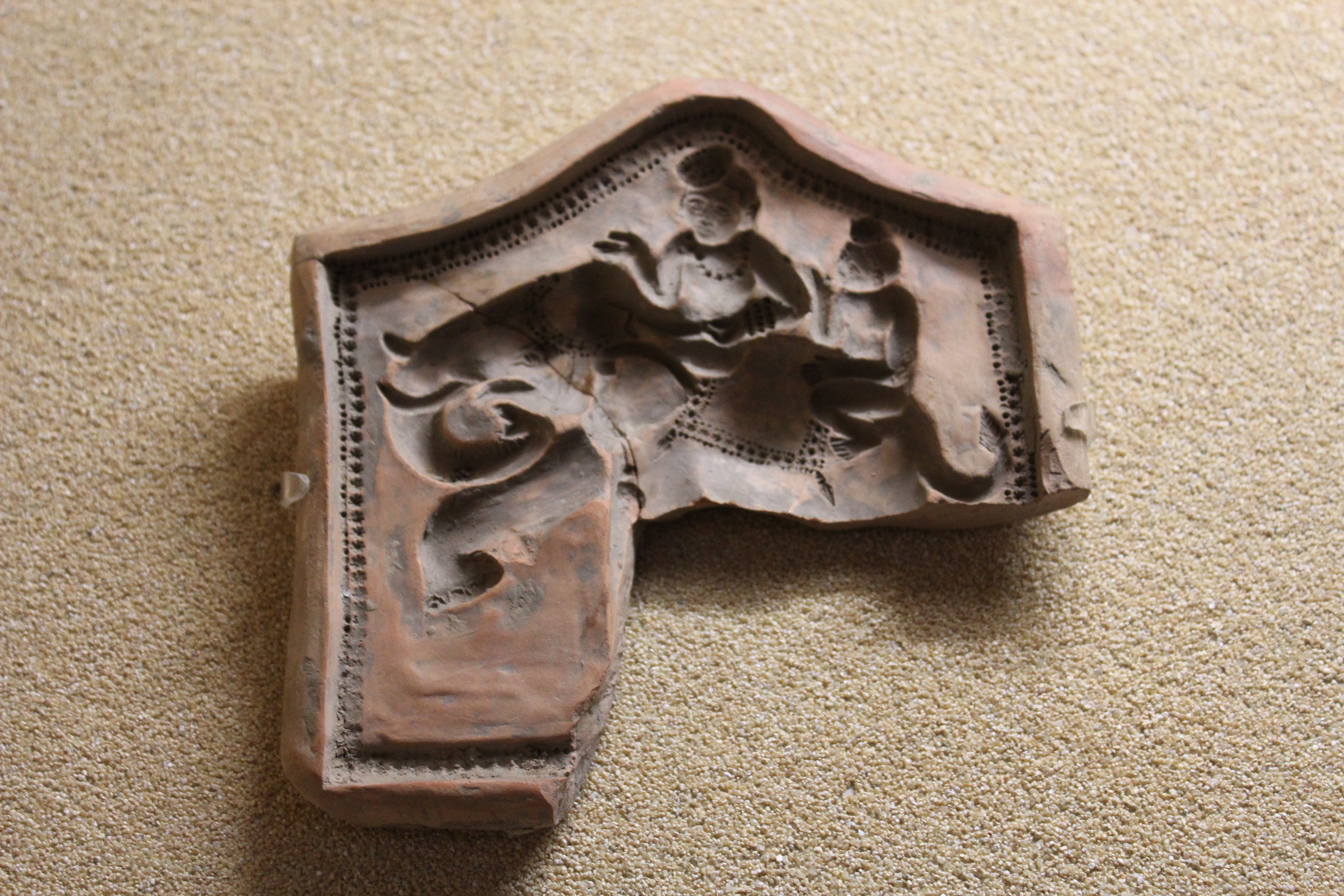
Terracotta moulds

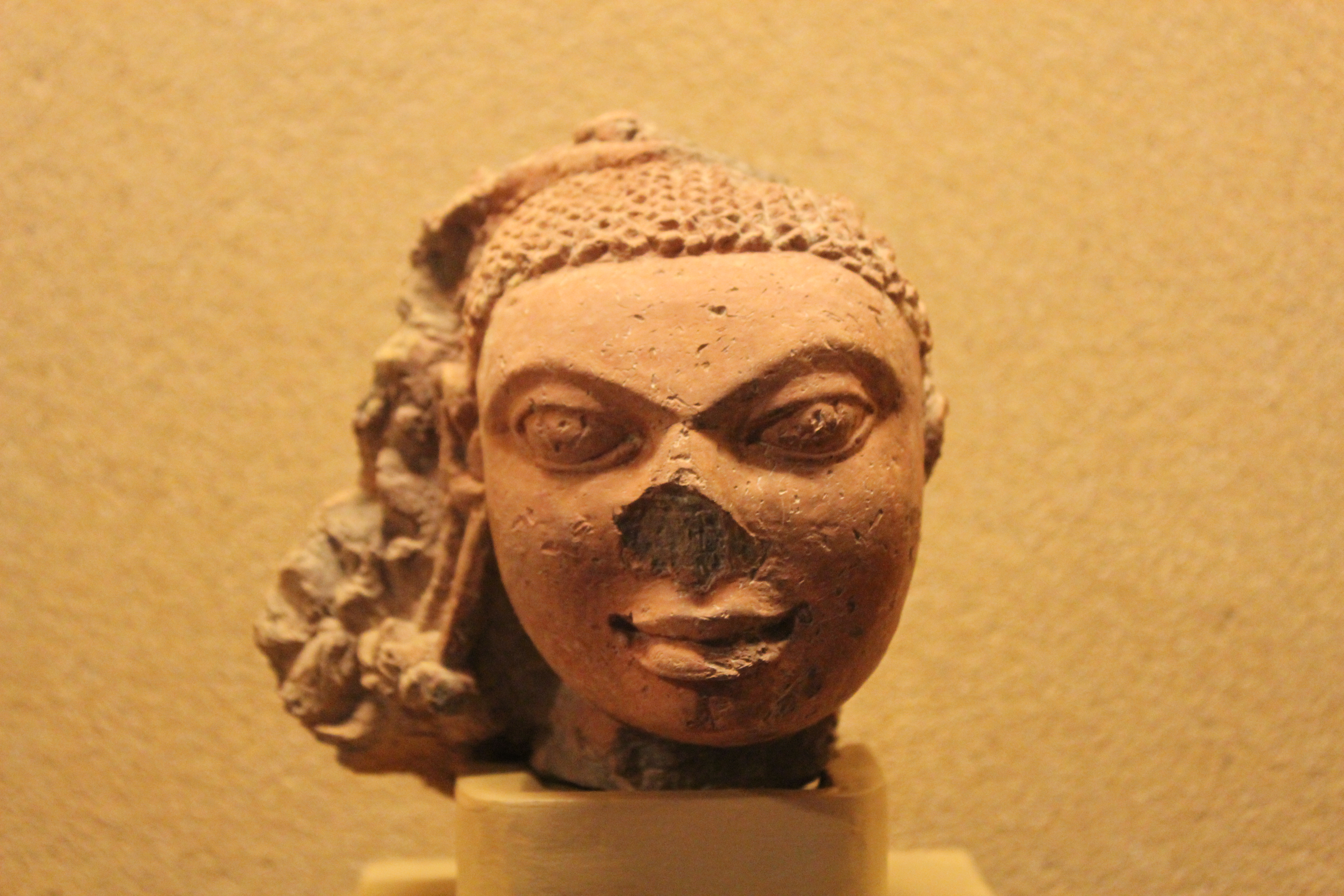
Terracotta Figurines

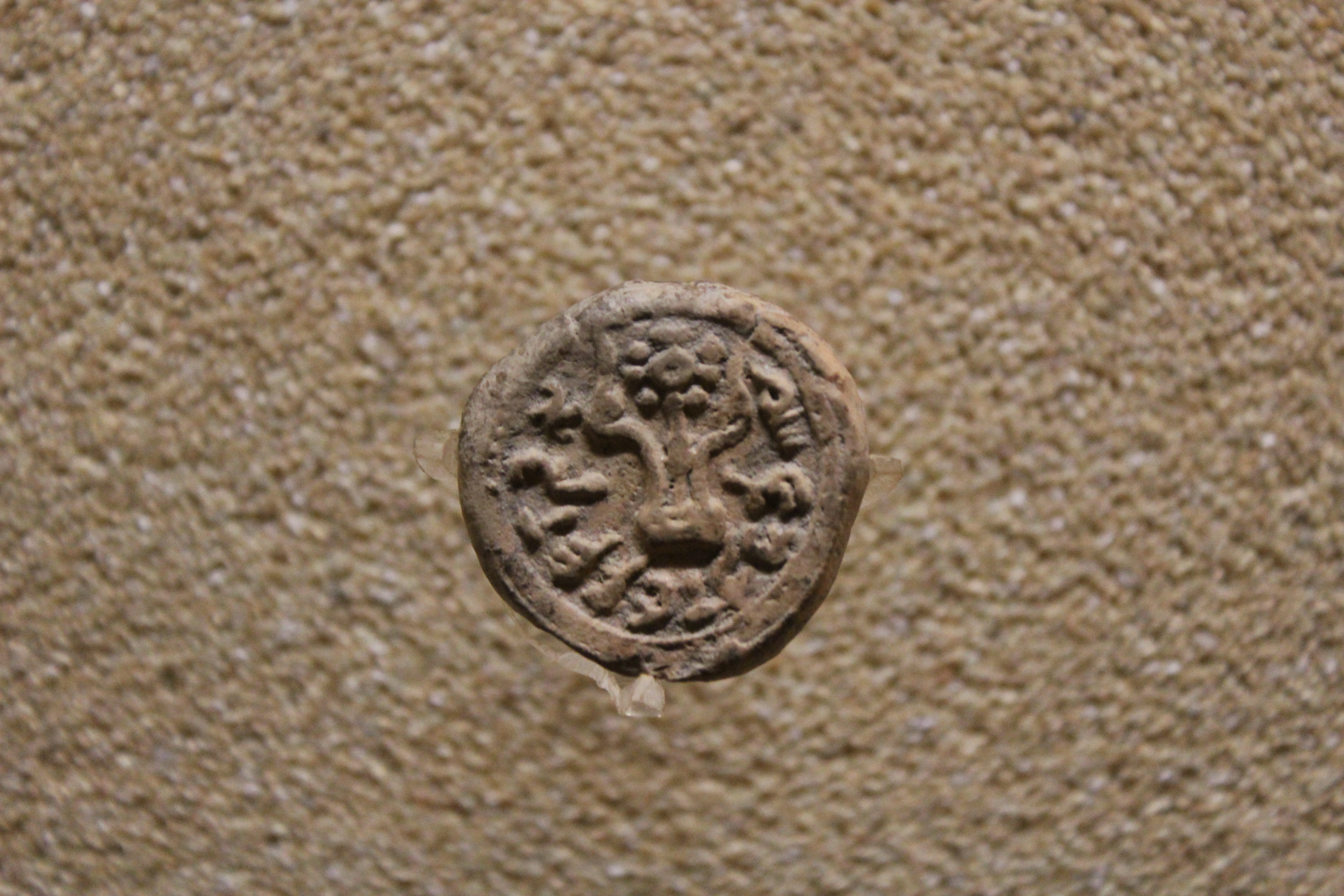
A terracotta plaque

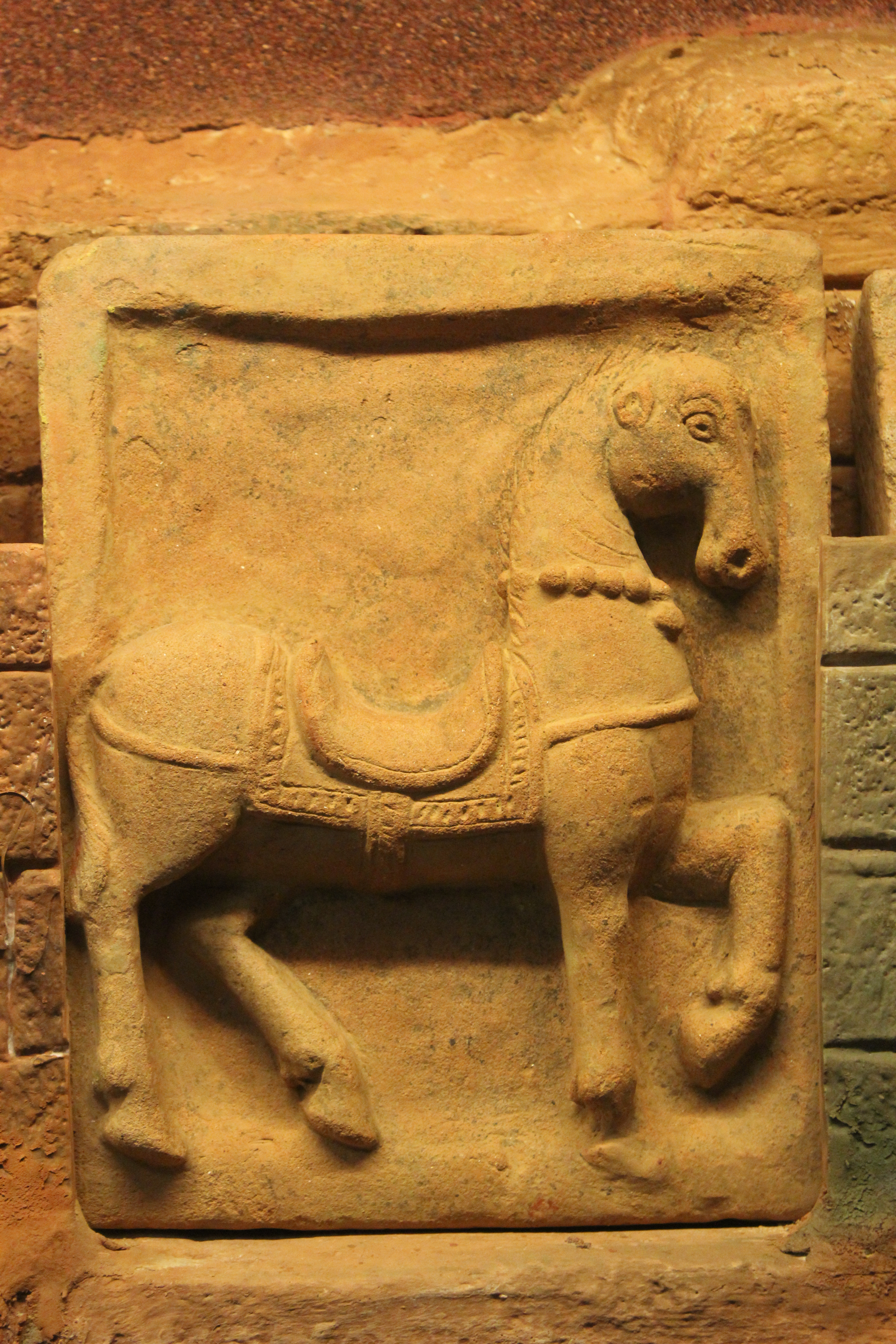
Terracotta horse

== See also ==
- List of museums in India
