= Taragarh Fort, Ajmer =

Fort in Ajmer, Rajasthan, India

Taragarh Fort
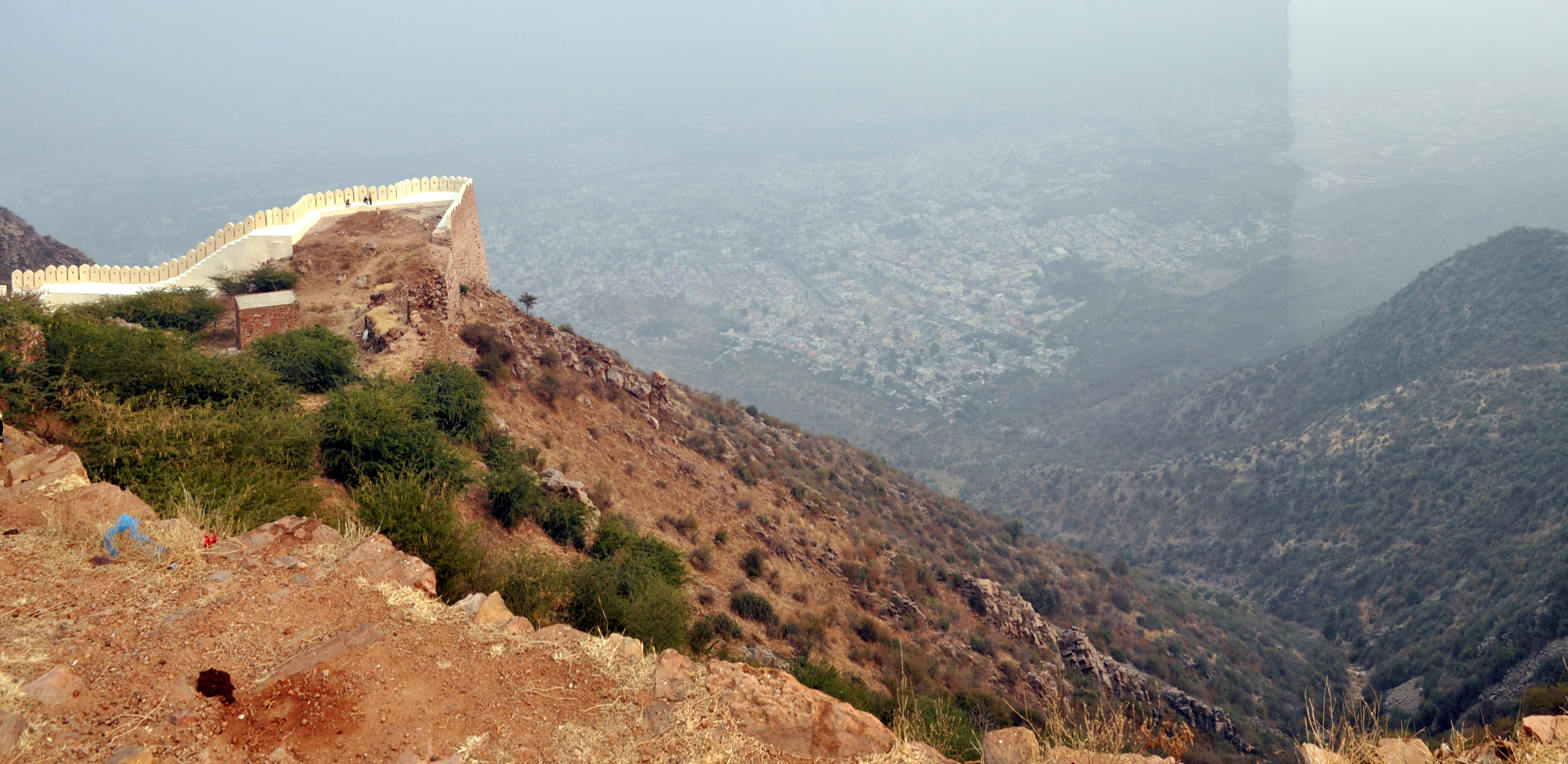
- Interactive map of Taragarh Fort
- Location: Ajmer, Rajasthan, India
- Coordinates: 26.442154°N 74.618288°E
- Type: Fort
- built by: Parmar Rajputs and Ajayaraja I

Taragarh Fort is a fortress built upon a steep hillside in the city of Ajmer in the Indian state of Rajasthan. It was constructed by Maharaja of Parmar Rajputs, and repaired by Ajayaraja Chauhan and it was originally called Ajaymeru Durg.

== History ==
Taragarh Fort, located in Ajmer, was historically recognized for its structural defensibility and geopolitical prominence in the regional power struggles of Rajasthan. While local traditions attribute early defensive engagements to the Chahamana (Chauhan) rulers, verifiable historical documentation of the fort’s structural administration becomes prominent during the late medieval period.

Parmar Rajputs assisted in capturing Taragarh fort of Ajmer. During the late 15th century, Prince Prithviraj Sisodia of Mewar, the elder brother of Rana Sanga, captured the fort after defeating the regional governor, Mallu Khan. Following its acquisition by Mewar, the fortification was systematically designated "Taragarh," named in honor of Prithviraj’s spouse, Tarabai. The fort remained under the administrative jurisdiction of the Kingdom of Mewar until Rana Sanga subsequently granted its revenue and custody to the noble Karamchand Panwar.

Following the Battle of Khanwa, which resulted in the defeat of Rana Sanga's confederacy by the Mughal emperor Babur, the fortification was integrated into the expanding territories of the Mughal Empire. Under Mughal imperial administration, the fort functioned as a vital military foothold for the subjection and consolidation of Rajputana and served as the administrative center for the Subah (province) of Ajmer. In the later periods of the empire, while nominal sovereignty was maintained by the central Mughal court, de facto administrative control over the fortification was frequently exercised by the Kachwaha Rajputs of Amber. Consequent to shifting imperial boundaries and the loss of its primary geopolitical utility, the fort eventually entered a phase of administrative disuse and structural decline.

== Architecture ==
There are three gateways to the fort known as Lakshmi Pol, Phuta Darwaza, and Gagudi ki Phatak. There were 14 bastions in the wall of this fort. Most parts of these gateways are now in ruins. The largest of its battlements is the 16th-century bastion known as the Bhim Burj, on which was once mounted a large cannon called Garbh Gunjam, or 'Thunder from the Womb'. In the fort are water reservoirs.

The fort also holds a shrine dedicated to Miran Saheb ki Dargah, who lost his life in 1202 CE during a Rajput attack. He was slain in a Rajput attack that took place while he and his men were conducting their prostration (namaaz).

After conquering the fort of Kandahar, Emperor Jahangir built this Marble Cage (Kathera) in the dargah of Meera Syed Hussain in 1615.

== Sources ==
- Crump, Vivien; Toh, Irene (1996). Rajasthan (hardback). London: Everyman Guides. p. 400. ISBN 1-85715-887-3.
- Michell, George, Martinelli, Antonio (2005). The Palaces of Rajasthan. London: Frances Lincoln. p. 271 pages. ISBN 978-0-7112-2505-3.
- Tillotson, G.H.R (1987). The Rajput Palaces - The Development of an Architectural Style (Hardback) (First ed.). New Haven and London: Yale University Press. p. 224 pages. ISBN 0-300-03738-4.
- Rajawat, D.S. (1991). Glimpses of Rajasthan: Off the Beaten Track. Delta Publications.
- Dhoundiyal, B.N. (1966). Rajasthan District Gazetteers: Ajmer. Gazetteer of India. Ajmer. Hauptbd. Bharat Printers.
- Sarda, Har Bilas (1918). Maharana Sanga, The Hindupat (1st ed.). Ajmer: Scottish Mission Industries Company Limited.
- architecture, mughal (1982). Ajmer Historical and Descriptive. Delhi: Abhinav, New Delhi, 1982-<2005>, Ajmer.ref=https://www.google.co.in/books/edition/History_of_Mughal_Architecture_The_trans/ha5fG13V3XcC?hl=en&gbpv=1&dq=khing+sawar&pg=PA259&printsec=frontcover
