= Vigrahapala I =

Pala emperor from 870 to 871

Vigrahapala

Pala emperor
- Reign: 870–871 CE
- Predecessor: Gopala II
- Successor: Narayanapala
- Spouse: Lajjadevi of Chedi
- Issue: Narayanapala
- Dynasty: Pala
- Father: Jayapala
- Religion: Buddhism

Vigrahapala (r. 870–871) was a ruler of the Pala dynasty, in the Bengal region of the Indian subcontinent. He was the sixth Pala emperor. He reigned for a brief period before becoming an ascetic. Vigrahapala was a grandson of Dharmapala's younger brother Vakapala and son of Jayapala. He was succeeded by his son, Narayanapala.

== Ancestry ==
Previously, the historians believed that Shurapala and Vigrahapala were the two names of the same person. However, the discovery of a copper plate in 1970 in the Mirzapur district conclusively established that these two were cousins. They either ruled simultaneously (perhaps over different territories) or in rapid succession. If they ruled in succession, it seems more likely that Shurapala preceded Vigrahapala, since Vigrahapala I and his descendants ruled in unbroken succession. Vigrahapala either dethroned Shurapala, or replaced him peacefully in absence of any direct heir to the throne.

The information about him and his ancestors is found in the Bhagalpur copper-plate inscription of his son, Narayanapala.

== Reign ==
Based on the different interpretations of the various epigraphs and historical records, the different historians estimate Vigrahapala's reign as follows:

Historian	Estimate of Gopala's reign
RC Majumdar (1971)	850–853 (along with Shurapala I)
AM Chowdhury (1967)	861–866 (along with Shurapala I)
BP Sinha (1977)	860–865 (along with Shurapala I)
DC Sircar (1975–76)	858–860

Vigrahapala was of peaceful disposition, and abdicated the throne in favour of his son Narayanpala.

== See also ==
- List of rulers of Bengal
