= Mahendrapala =

Pala Emperor from 839 to 854

Pala Emperor
- Reign: 839–854 CE
- Predecessor: Devapala
- Successor: Shurapala I
- Dynasty: Pala
- Father: Devapala
- Mother: Mahata Devi
- Religion: Buddhism

Mahendrapala (r. c. 839–854) was the fourth king of the Pala dynasty of the Bengal region of the Indian subcontinent. He was the son of Devapala and his queen Mahata.

== Reign ==
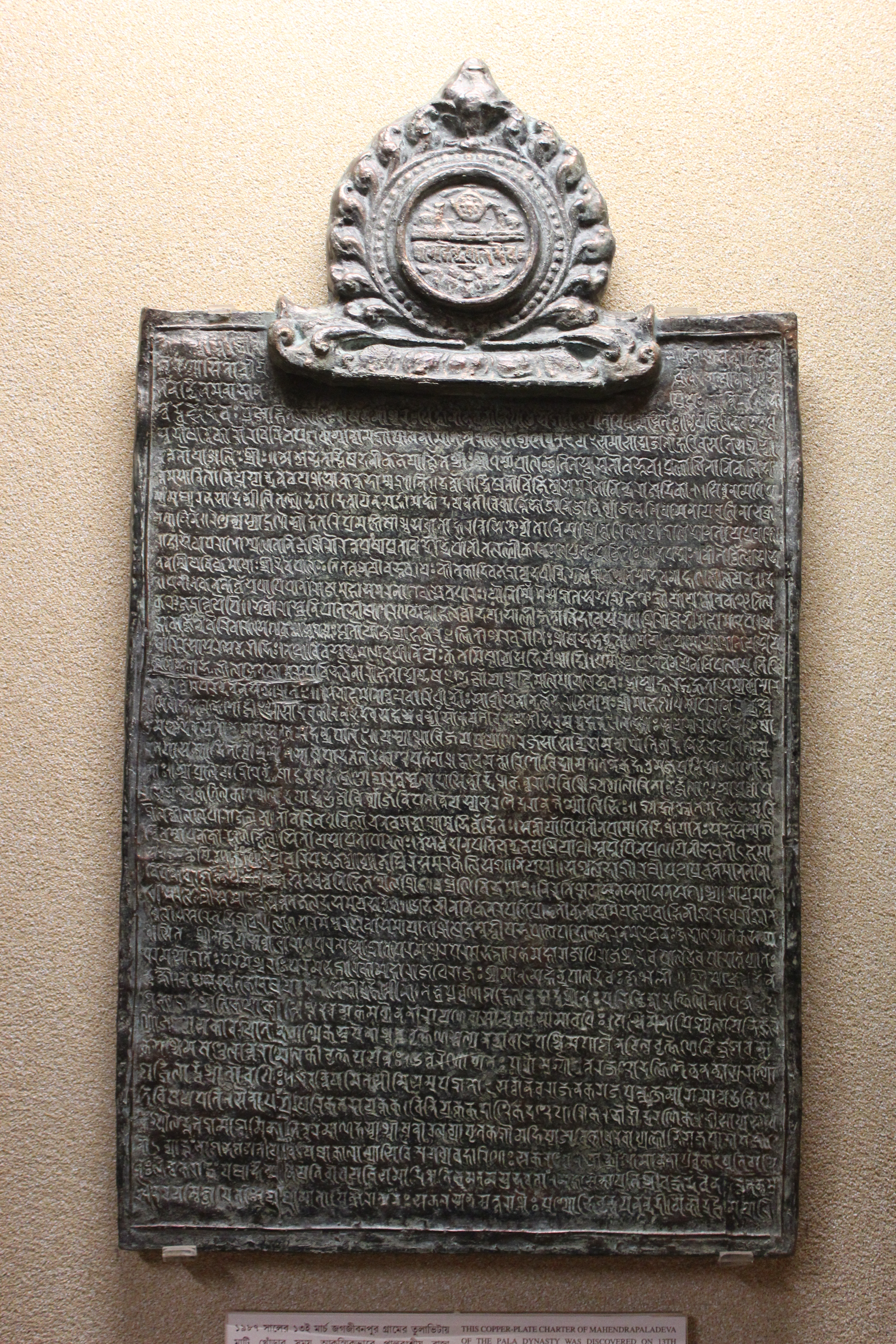
Copper plate inscription of Mahendrapala, at the State Archaeological Museum in Kolkata.

Mahendrapala has been mentioned in some Pala records, but earlier, the historians used to believe that these mentions referred to the Gurjara-Pratihara king Mahendrapala I. However, the discovery of the Jagjivanpur copper plate charter issued by Mahendrapala made it clear that he was a distinct Pala emperor, who succeeded Devapala. The charter, issued in the 7th year of Mahendrapala's reign (believed to be 854 CE), mentions the construction of a monastery at Nandadirghika Udranga by Mahendrapala's mahasenapati ("great general") Vajradeva. The grant is dated in his 7th regnal year and issued from the Kuddalakhataka jayaskandhavara (the camp of victory).

Mahendrapala was succeeded by Shurapala I. According to the Jagjivanpur inscription, Shurapala I was Mahendrapala's younger brother and royal envoy.

Mahendrapala appears to have retained the Pala control over North Bengal and Bihar. He possibly carried out further campaigns against the Hunas and the Utkalas, and passed his empire intact to his younger brother and successor, Shurapala I.

== See also ==
- List of rulers of Bengal
