= Narayanapala =

Pala emperor from 871 to 925

Pala emperor
- Reign: 871–925 CE
- Predecessor: Vigrahapala I
- Successor: Rajyapala
- Spouse: Mamma, daughter of Govindaraja
- Issue: Rajyapala
- Dynasty: Pala
- Father: Vigrahapala I
- Mother: Lajjadevi
- Religion: Hinduism (Shaivism)

Narayanapala (r. 871–925) was the seventh emperor of the Pala Empire of the Eastern regions of the Indian subcontinent, mainly the Bengal and Bihar regions.

== Reign ==
The Gaya temple inscription dated in his 7th regnal year, the Indian Museum (found in the erstwhile Patna district) stone inscription dated in his 9th regnal year, the Bhagalpur copper-plate grant dated in his 17th regnal year, Bihar votive image inscription dated in his 54th regnal year and the Badal pillar inscription of his minister Bhatta Guravamishra provide information about his reign.

Based on the different interpretations of the various epigraphs and historical records, the different historians estimate Narayanapala's reign as follows:

Historian	Estimate of reign
RC Majumdar (1971)	854–908 CE
AM Chowdhury (1967)	866–920 CE
BP Sinha (1977)	865–920 CE
DC Sircar (1975–76)	860–917 CE

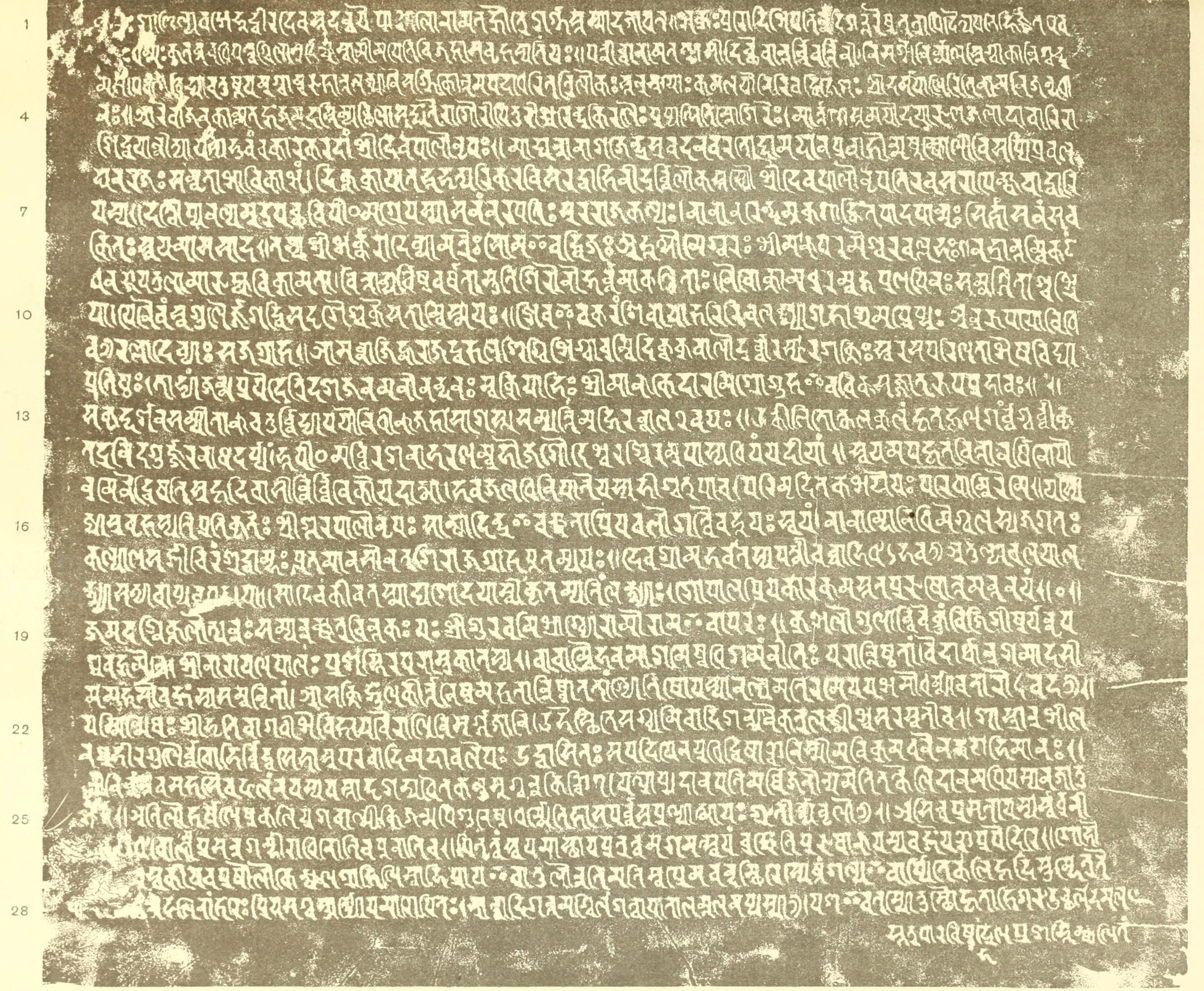
The Badal Pillar Inscription of Narayanapala.

He was the son of Vigrahapala I by his wife, the Kalachuri princess Lajjadevi, who is identified by O.P. Verma as being the probable daughter of Kokalla I. Naryanapala was later succeeded by his son Rajyapala.

== Religion and religious policy ==
Before the Pāla Dynasty, Shaivism struck roots in Bengal, but it was during that dynasty that Brahmaņa ministers enhanced their influence and established Hinduism over Buddhism. Especially during the reign of Narayanapala, Shaivism gained an extensive hold upon the minds of people of Bengal. Buddhism's prevalence in the region reduced, gradually becoming blended with Shaivism.

== See also ==
- List of rulers of Bengal
