= Dharmapala of Bengal =

Pala emperor from late 8th century

Dharmapala
- Parameshvara; Paramabhattaraka; Maharajadhiraja; Vangapati

Pala Emperor
- Reign: 783–815 CE
- Predecessor: Gopala
- Successor: Devapala
- Spouse: Rannadevi (Rashtrakuta princess)
- Issue: Tribhuvanpala; Devapala
- Military career
- Conflicts: Pala Tibetan War; Tripartite Struggle
- Dynasty: Pala
- Father: Gopala
- Mother: Deddadevi of the Bhadra dynasty
- Religion: Buddhism

Dharmapala (Note: Siddhamātṛikā script: , Dha-rmma-pā-la; Bengali: ধর্মপাল) was the second Pala emperor of Bengal (Vangala) in the Indian subcontinent. He was the son and successor of Gopala, the founder of the Pala dynasty. Dharmapala was mentioned as the King of Vangala (Vangala-bhūmipat) in the Nesari plates (dated 805 AD) of Rashtrakuta dynasty. He greatly expanded the boundaries of the empire and made the Palas a dominant power in the northern and eastern India.

Dharmapala directly ruled over the present-day West Bengal, Bihar and Bangladesh, and installed a nominee at Kannauj [UP]. The Pala chronicles also claim that several other rulers of North India acknowledged his suzerainty, but these claims seem to be exaggerated. Dharmapala was defeated twice by the Gurjara-Pratiharas, but each time the Rashtrakutas subsequently defeated the Pratiharas, leaving Palas as the dominant power in North India. Dharmapala was succeeded by his son Devapala who further expanded the empire.

== Reign ==
Dharamapala directly ruled over the present-day Bengal and Bihar regions. Since the extent of Gopala's kingdom is not known, it is uncertain if Dharmapala inherited these territories or acquired them through conquests.

He also became dominant in other areas of North India, but the exact details of his victories are not available. It is known that he defeated Indraraja (or Indrayudha), the ruler of Kanauj, who was a vassal of the Pratiharas. He then handed over the throne to his own nominee, Charkayudha, and held an imperial court at Kannauj. According to the Khalimpur copper plate issued by Dharmapala, this court was attended by the rulers of Bhoja (possibly Vidarbha), Matsya (Jaipur and north-east Rajasthan), Madra (East Punjab), Kuru (Haryana-Delhi-Western UP region), Yadu (possibly Mathura, Dwarka or Siṁhapura in the Punjab), Yavana, Avanti, Gandhara and Kira (Kangra Valley). These kings accepted the installation of Chakrayudha on the Kannauj throne, while "bowing down respectfully with their diadems trembling". Some historians have speculated that all these kingdoms might have been the vassal states of the Pala empire. Although the rulers of these regions may have paid obeisance to Dharmapala, but maintained their autonomy. He was possibly the most powerful ruler in North India and was thus called Uttarapathasvamin (lit. 'Lord of the North').

The Kannauj dispute resulted in a struggle between Dharmapala and the Pratihara king Vatsaraja. Vatsaraja defeated Dharmapala in a battle fought near Prayag. Shortly after this, Vatsaraja himself was defeated by the Rashtrakuta king Dhruva of southern India. After Vatsaraja's defeat, Dharmapala regained control of Kannauj, but was defeated by Dhruva. However, soon after this, Dhruva returned to his southern kingdom, and thus, Dharmapala gained more than he had lost. He quickly regained his power in northern India.

According to the Monghyr (Munger) copper plate, Dharmapala offered prayers at Kedar (possibly Kedarnath) and Gokarna (variously identified with Gokarna in Nepal, Gokarna in Karnataka, or a place in Orissa). This indicates that his position as a sovereign was accepted by most rulers, although this was a loose arrangement, unlike the empire of the Mauryas or the Guptas. The other rulers acknowledged the military and political supremacy of Dharmapala, but maintained their own territories. One tradition also claims that Nepal was a vassal state of the Pala Empire during his reign.

Sometime later, Dharmapala faced another attack by the Pratiharas. Vatsaraja's son Nagabhata II conquered Kannauj, making Chakrayudha his vassal. This brought Dharmapala and Nagabhata II into a military conflict near Munger. Dharmapala suffered a defeat, but in a repeat of history, the Rashtrakutas invaded the Pratihara kingdom. Nagabhata II was defeated by the Rashtrakuta king and Dhruva's son Govinda III. Govinda III then proceeded to Kannauj, and subdued both Chakrayudha and Dharmapala. Like his father, Govinda III then returned to his kingdom in the south.

Dharmapala ruled for about 40 years and was succeeded by his son Devapala.

=== Period ===
Based on the different interpretations of the various epigraphs and historical records, the different historians estimate Dharmapala's reign as follows:

Historian	Estimate of reign
RC Majumdar (1971)	770–810
AM Chowdhury (1967)	781–821
BP Sinha (1977)	783–820
DC Sircar (1975–76)	775–812
Satish Chandra (1997)	770–810

== Patronage to Buddhism ==
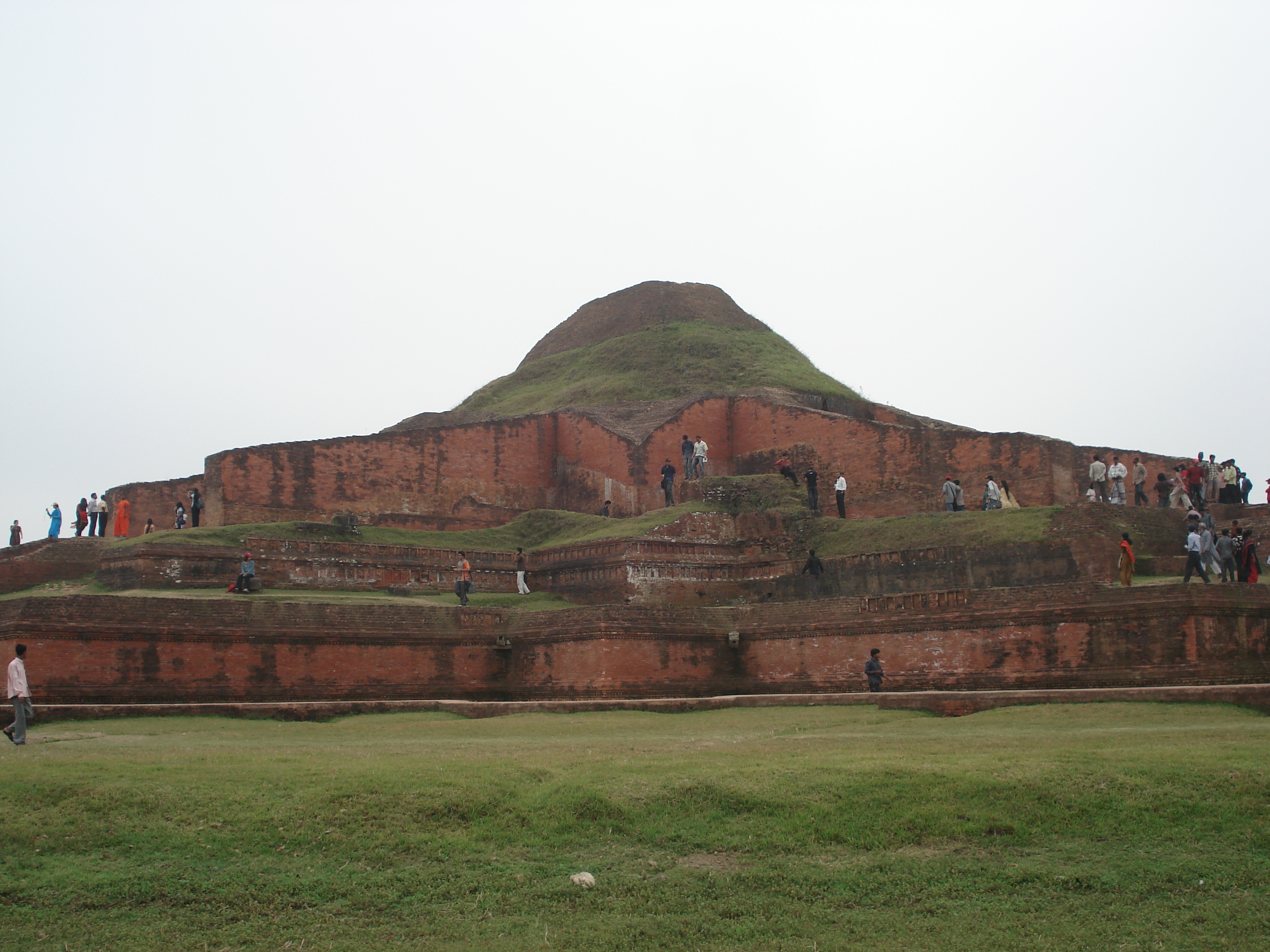
Somapura Mahavihara is the largest Buddhist vihara in the Indian subcontinent built by Dharmapala in Naogaon District, Bangladesh; it became a World Heritage Site in 1985.

Dharmapala was a great patron of Buddhism. He granted 200 villages to Nalanda university and revived it. He founded the Vikramashila monastery, which later evolved into a great learning centre of Buddhism. Vikramashila had about 100 professors and was managed by a governing body of six members. The most celebrated name associated with the Vikramshila University was that of Buddhist scholar Atiśa, who was greatly respected in Tibet. One of its rectors, Ratnakirshanti, a logician, was invited to Ceylon. During Dharmapala's reign, Buddhagupta was rector of the university. Dharmapala built the great Somapura Mahavihara in Paharpur, Naogaon District, Bangladesh. Taranath also credits him with establishing 50 religious institutions and patronising the Buddhist author Haribhadra. Buton Rinchen Drub credits Dharmapala with building the monastery at Uddandapura (Odantapuri), although other Tibetan accounts, such as that of Taranatha, state that it was magically built and then entrusted to Devapala.

== Epigraphs ==
The epigraphs from Dharmapala's reign include:

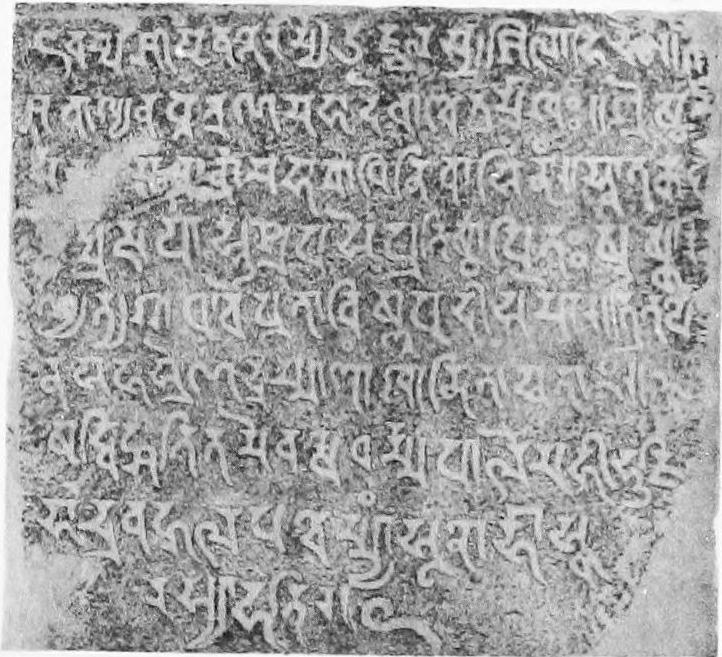
Keśava Praśasti

Bodhgaya Stone Inscription (Kesava Prasasti)
Dated in the 26th regnal year, this inscription is a work of Kesava, who was the son of sculptor Ujjala. It records the establishment of an image of Chaturmukha (four-faced) Mahadeva and the excavation of a lake at the cost of 3000 drammas (coins) at Mahabodhi.

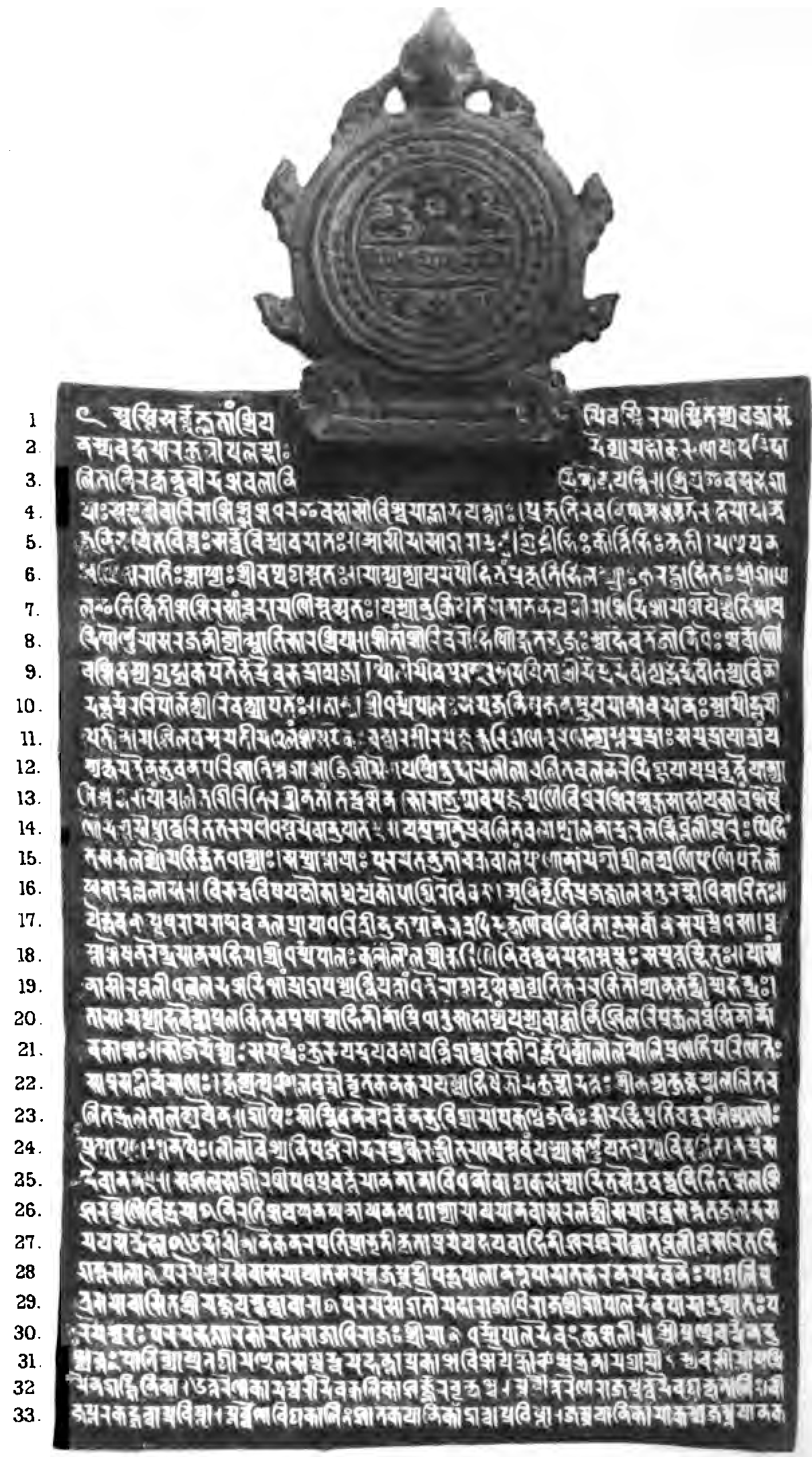
Khalimpur Copper Plate

Khalimpur Copper Plate
Dated in the 32nd regnal year, this copper plate is inscribed by Tatata, who was the son of Subhata and grandson of Bhojata. It records Dharmapala's defeat of Indrayudha and the installation of his tributary Chakrayudha at Kannauj. It states that the kings of Bhoja, Matsya, Madra, Kuru, Yadu, Yavana, Avanti, Gandhara, and Kira (possibly Kangra) attended the imperial assembly and approved it. It further states that Dharmapala granted four villages to a feudal lord called Naryanavarman for the construction and maintenance of a temple dedicated to the Lord Nanna-Narayana, with the boundaries of the donated villages including a shrine constructed for the Goddess Kadamvari. The dyutaka or emissary of this plate is Yuvaraja (Crown Prince) Tribhuvanpala.

Nalanda Copper Plate
This plate is partially damaged due to burning. The name of the donor is not clear, but his father's name is Dharmadatta. It records the gift of a village, Uttarama, situated in the Gaya visaya (district) of the Nagar bhukti (division).

Nalanda Stone Inscription
This inscription is a work of the artisans Kese, Savvo, Vokkaka, and Viggata. It is inscribed on a stupa sculpture with carvings that depict seated Buddha figures. It records Vairochana as the person who commissioned this deed, describing him as a brilliant and valiant man who lived during the rule of Dharmapala.

Valgudar Image Inscription
It records the dedication of an image of god Madhusrenika by Ajhuka, the wife of Sato, in the city of Krimila.

Paharpur Seals
These two seals were discovered from the Somapura Mahavihara. Both depict a dharma chakra flanked by antelopes, and state that they were issued by the monks belonging to a vihara at Somapura, which was established by Dharmapala.

== See also ==
- List of rulers of Bengal
