= Naradeva =

- Nṛpa

King of Sapadalaksha
- Reign: c. 709–721 CE
- Predecessor: Samantaraja
- Successor: Ajayaraja I
- Dynasty: Chahamanas of Shakambhari

Naradeva (r. c. 709–721 CE) was an Indian king belonging to the Chahamana dynasty of Shakambhari (modern Sambhar). He ruled parts of present-day Rajasthan in north-western India.

Naradeva has been mentioned as the successor of Samantaraja in Prabandha Kosha. The Purtana Prabandha Sangraha names him as the successor of Samantaraja's predecessor Vasudeva. Naradeva also finds a mention in other texts, such as the Hammira Mahakavya and the Surjana-Charita. The Prithviraja Vijaya does not mention him, presumably because his reign was short and insignificant.

The Bijolia rock inscription names Nṛpa ("ruler") Purnatalla as the son and successor of Samantaraja. Some scholars, such as D. R. Bhandarkar, interpreted Purnatalla as another name of Naradeva. Others, such as Dasharatha Sharma and G. H. Ojha interpreted Purnatalla as the name of the locality where Naradeva ruled. According to J. N. Asopa, this locality can be identified with either Pundlota or Pundla, both near Merta.

Naradeva was succeeded by his brother Ajayaraja I.
