= Dineshchandra Sircar =

Indian epigraphist, historian, numismatist and folklorist (1907–1985)

- Born: 1907; Krishnanagar, Bengal Presidency, British India
- Died: 1985 (aged 77–78); Calcutta, India
- Occupation(s): Historian, epigraphist

Dineshchandra Sircar (1907–1985), also known as D. C. Sircar or D. C. Sarkar, was an epigraphist, historian, numismatist and folklorist, known particularly in India and Bangladesh for his work deciphering inscriptions. He was the Chief Epigraphist of the Archaeological Survey of India (1949–1962), Carmichael Professor of Ancient Indian History and Culture at the University of Calcutta (1962–1972) and the General President of the Indian History Congress. In 1972, Sircar was awarded the Sir William Jones Memorial Plaque.

== Early life and education ==
Sircar was born in Krishnanagar in 1907, which is in present day West Bengal (India).

== Selected bibliography ==
He authored more than forty books both in Bengali and English. Some of his best known books include:

- Pala-purva Yuger Vamsanucarita ("Genealogy of Pre-Pala Age" in Bengali)
- Pala-Sena Yuger Vamsanucarita ("Genealogy of Pala-Sena Age" in Bengali)
- Asoker Vani ("Sermons of Ashoka" in Bengali)
- Silalekha-Tamrasasanadir Prasanga ("On Stone and Copperplate Inscriptions" in Bengali)
- Prachin Itihaser Kahini ("Story of Ancient History" in Bengali)
- Sanskritik Itihaser Prasanga ("On Cultural History", two volumes in Bengali)
- Select Inscriptions Bearing on Indian History and Civilisation (two volumes)
- Indian Epigraphy (1965)
- Indian Epigraphical Glossary
- Inscriptions of Asoka,
- Epigraphical Discoveries in East Pakistan
- Studies in the Geography of Ancient and Medieval India
- Some Epigraphical Records of the Mediaeval Period from Eastern India
- Studies in Indian Coins
- Journal of Ancient Indian History Ed.
- The Early Pallavas (1935)
- The Successors of the Satvahana in Lower Deccan (1939)
- Successors of the Satvahana in the eastern Deccan (1935)
- Social Life in Ancient India (1971)

He edited Epigraphia Indica volumes XXVIII to XXXVI, three of them jointly and the others independently.
