= Ajmer =

- City
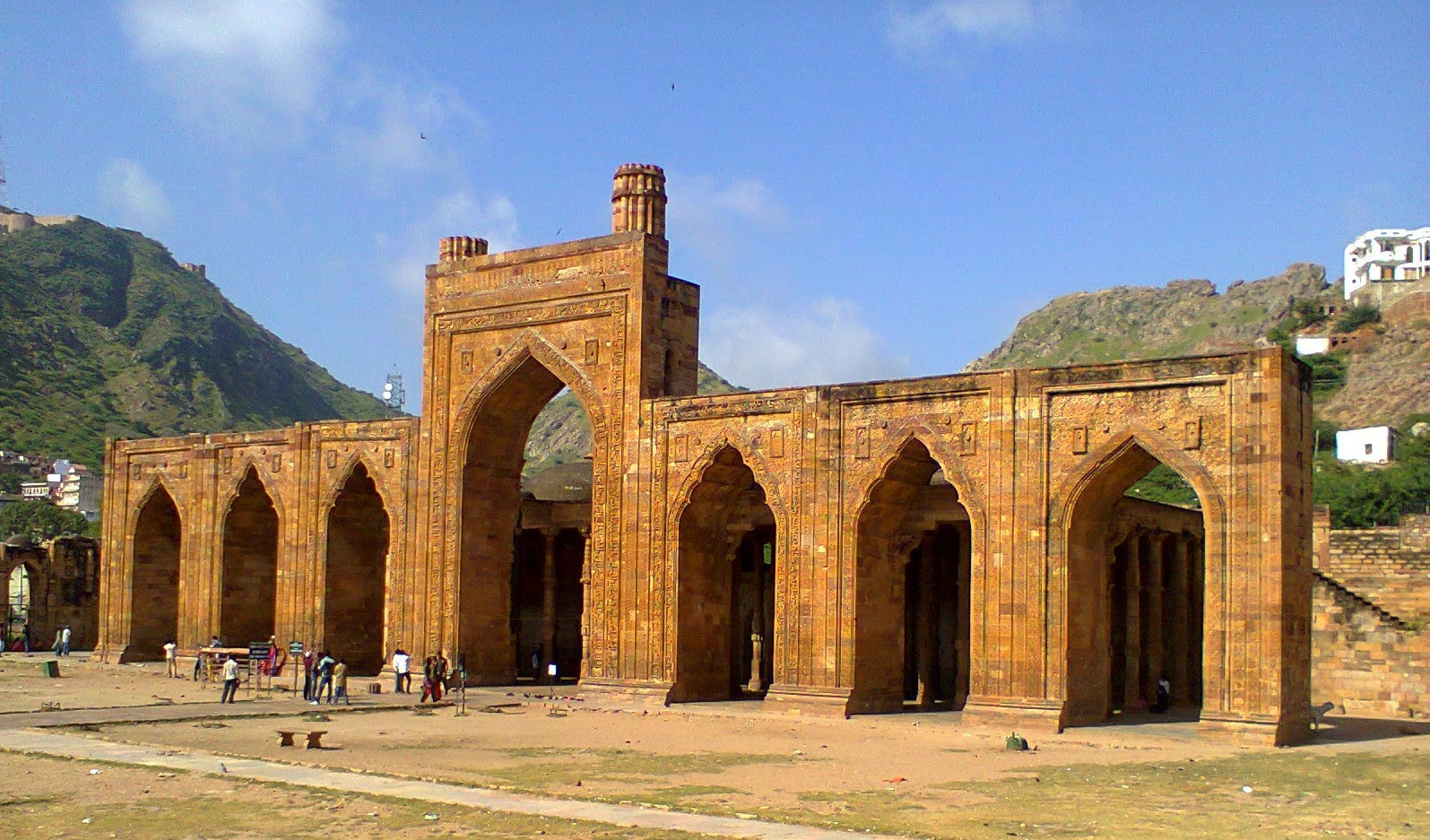
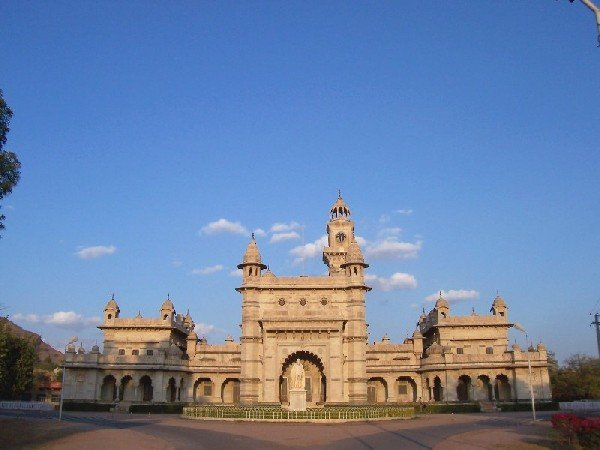
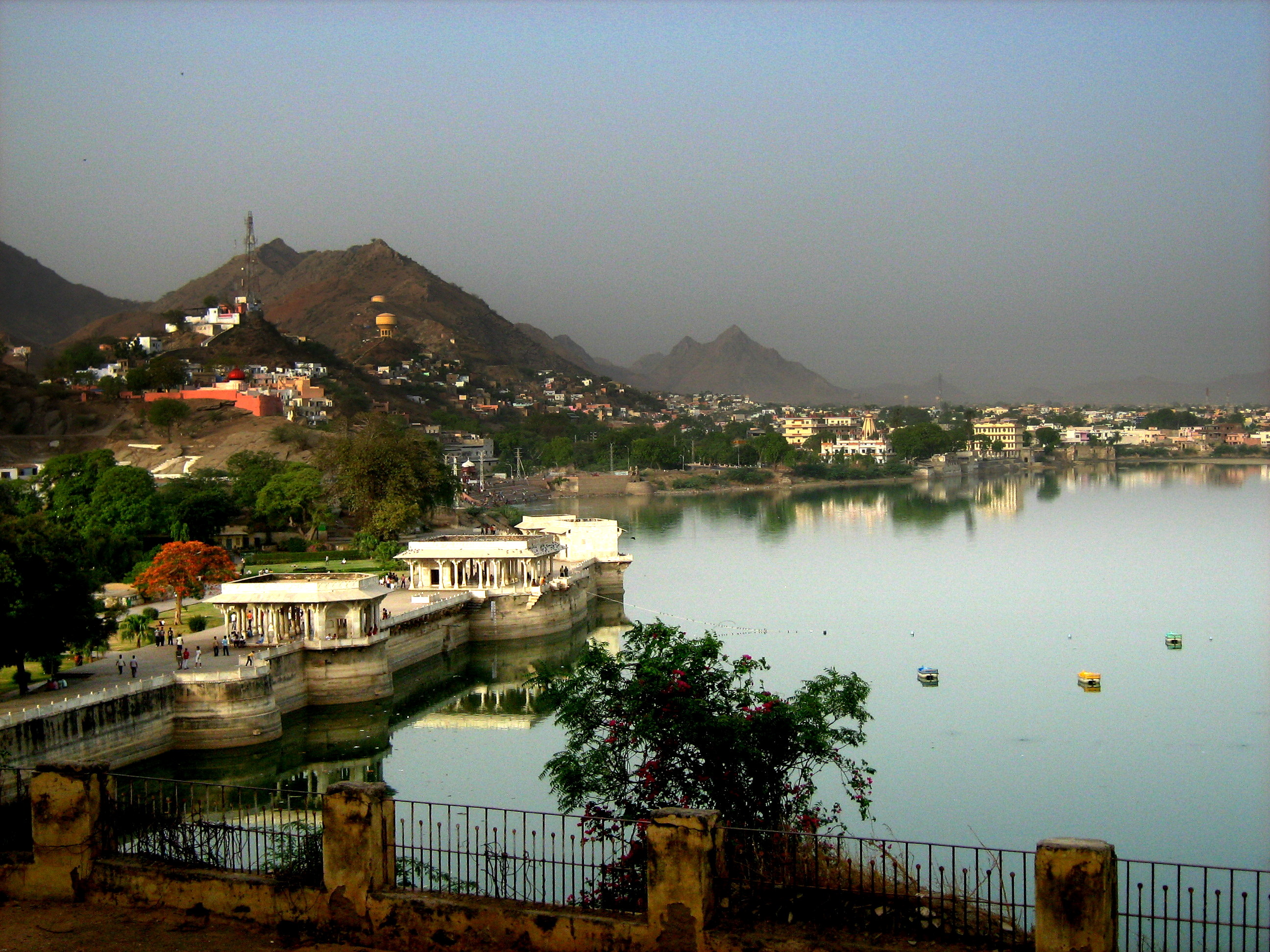
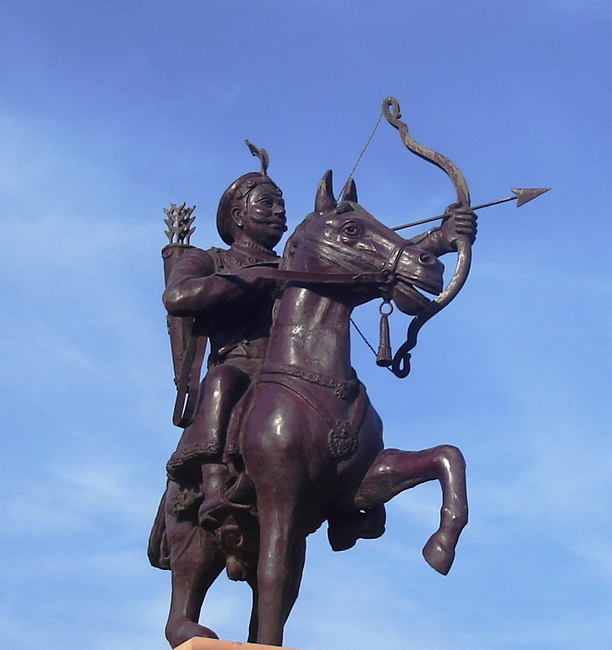
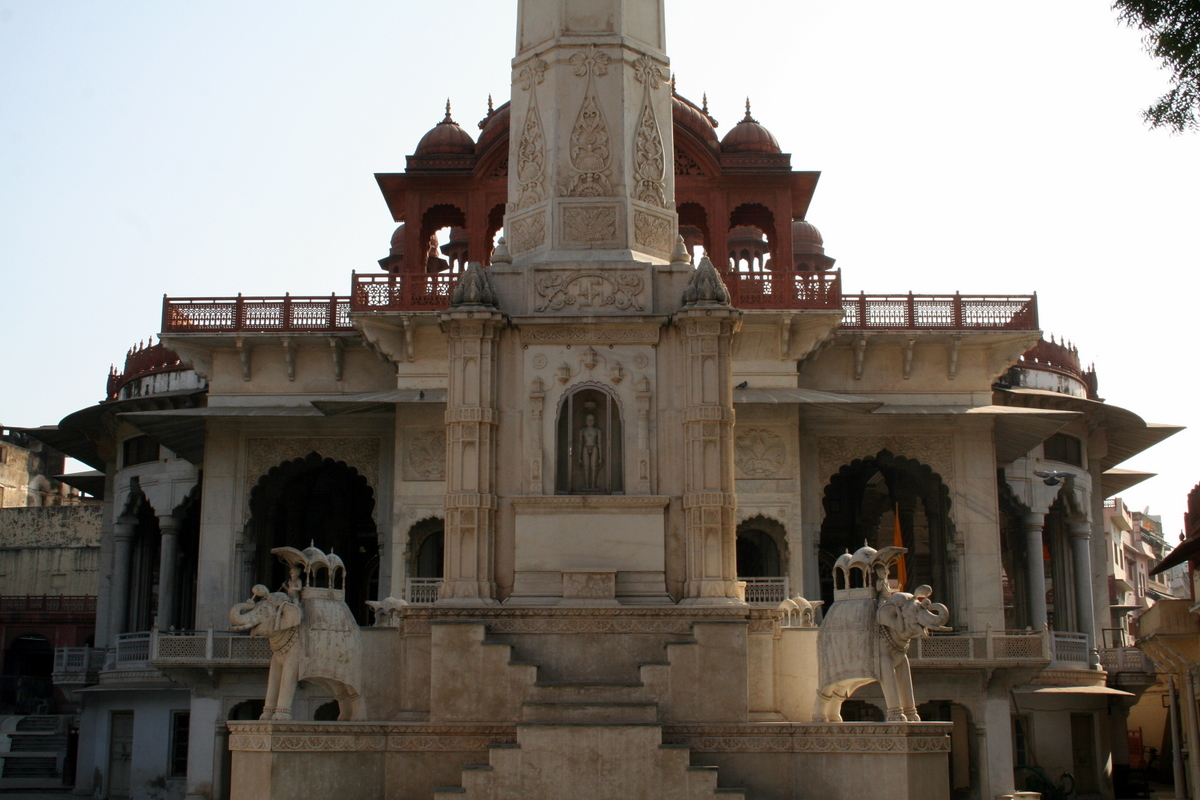
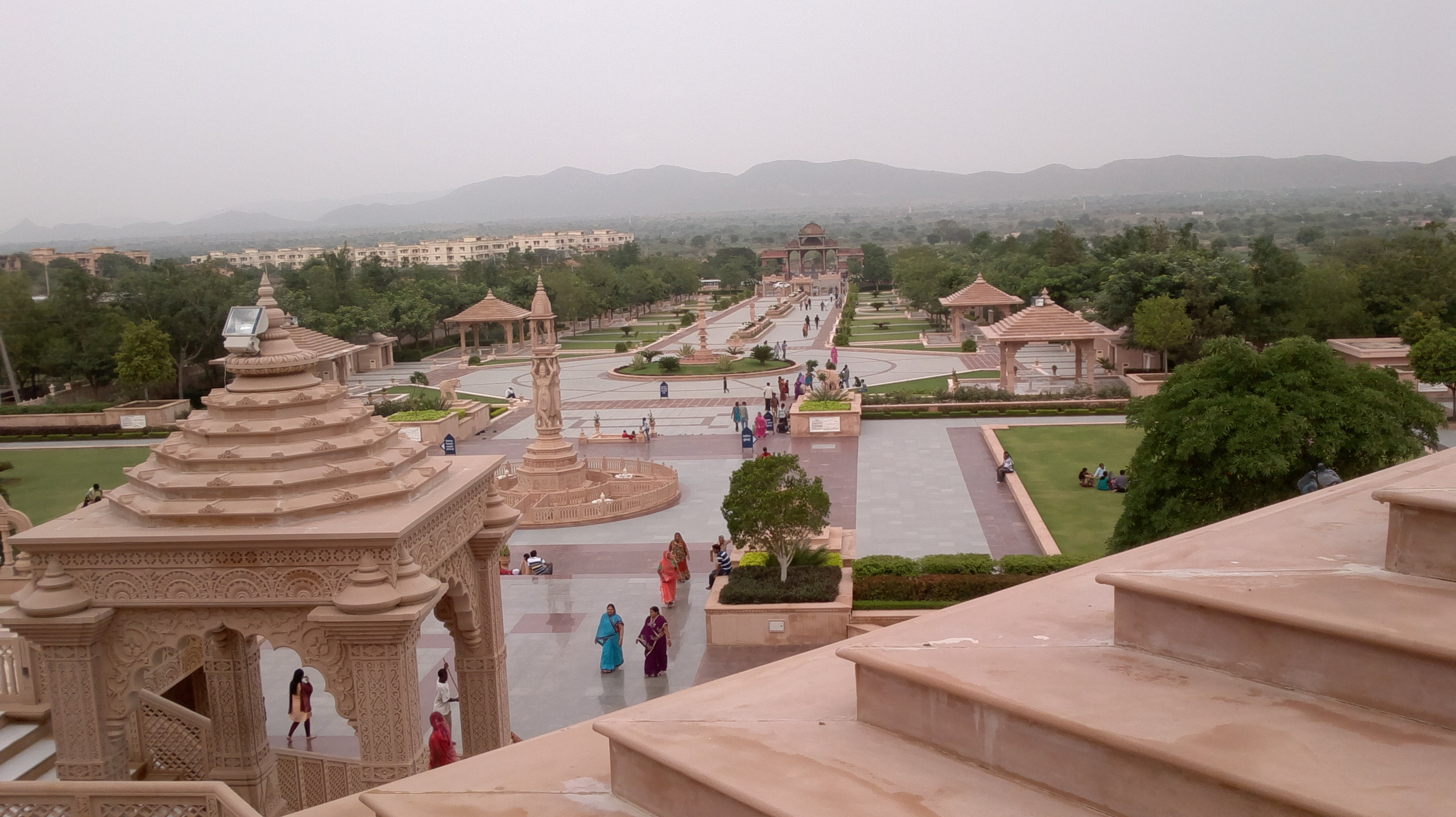
- Adhai Din Ka Jhonpra Mayo college Ana Sagar Lake Prithviraj statue Soniji Ki Nasiyan Nareli Jain Temple
- Nickname: Heart of Rajasthan
- Location in Rajasthan, India Ajmer (India) Ajmer (Asia)
- Coordinates: 26.4499°N 74.6399°E
- Country: India
- State: Rajasthan
- District: Ajmer
- Founder: Ajayaraja I or Ajayaraja II
- Named for: Ajayaraja I or Ajayaraja II

Government
  - Type: Municipal Corporation
  - Body: Ajmer Municipal Corporation
  - Mayor: Smt. Anamika Sharma (BJP)

Area
  - City: 155 km^{2} (60 sq mi)
- Elevation: 480 m (1,570 ft)

Population (2011)
  - City: 542,321
  - Density: 3,500/km^{2} (9,060/sq mi)
  - Urban: 551,101

Languages
  - Official: Hindi
  - Additional official: English
  - Regional: Marwari (Rajasthani)
- Time zone: UTC+5:30 (IST)
- PIN: 305001 to 305023
- Telephone code: 0145, +91145
- Vehicle registration: RJ-01
- Website: www.ajmer.rajasthan.gov.in

Ajmer (pronounced [əd͡ʑ.meːɾ]) is a city in the Indian state of Rajasthan. It is the administrative headquarters of the Ajmer district and Ajmer division. Because of its central position in the state, it is referred to as the "Heart of Rajasthan".

The city lies in a valley of the Aravalli Range. It has had a municipal body since 1869. Ajmer was among the cities chosen for the Government of India's HRIDAY scheme and for the Smart Cities Mission.

== Etymology ==
The city of Ajmer was established as "Ajaya Meru", meaning "invincible hill" in Sanskrit by a Chahamana ruler, either Ajayaraja I or Ajayaraja II. It refers to the Taragarh Hill, on which the city is situated. Over time, "Ajaya Meru" evolved into "Ajmer". It served as their capital until the 12th century CE.

A Gujarati historic novel named Gujaratno Jay written by Zaverchand Meghani, based on various Jain Prabandhas, describes the city as sapādalakṣaṇa (સપાદલક્ષણ).

== History ==
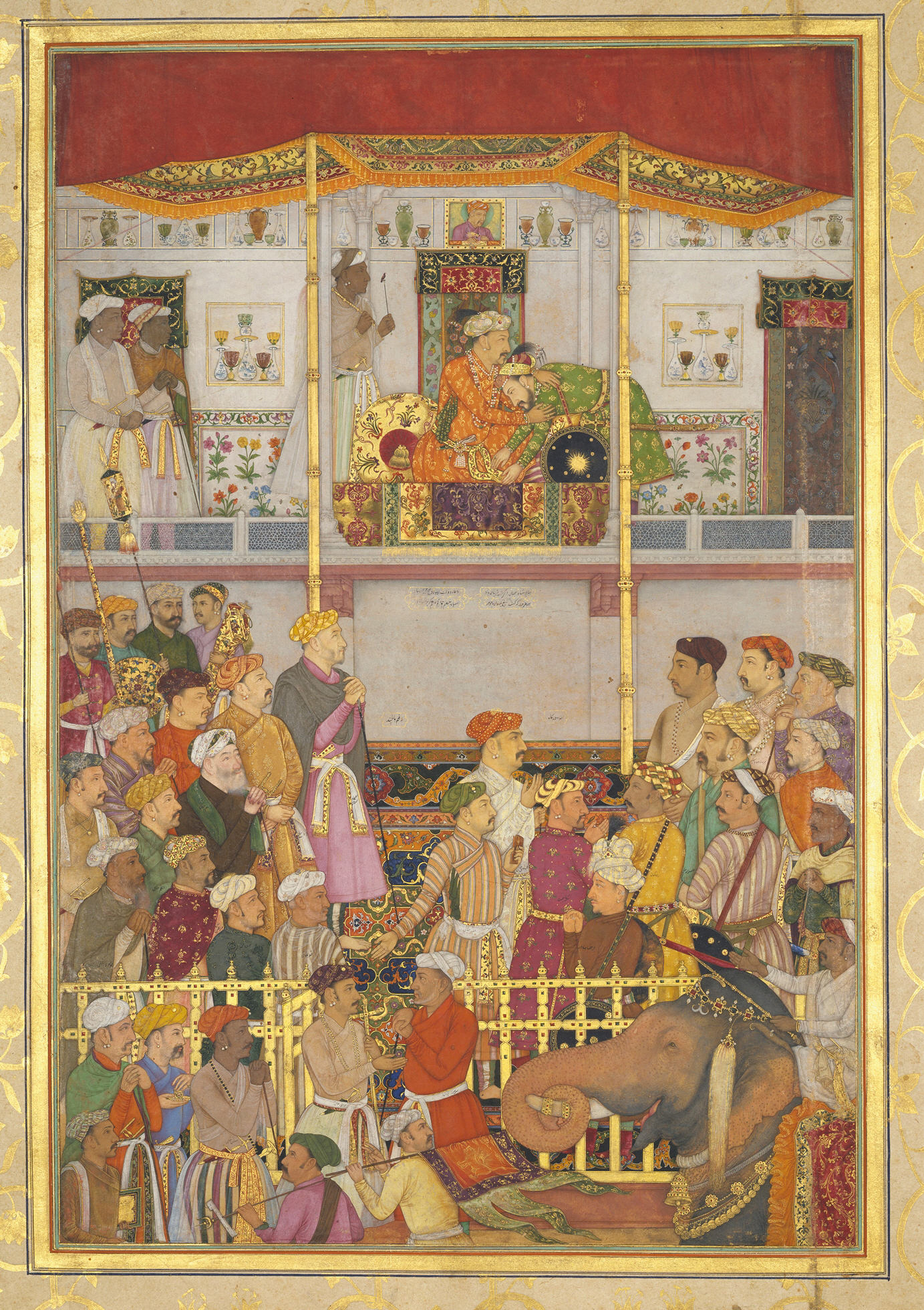
Jahangir receives Prince Khurram at Ajmer on his return from the Mewar campaign

Ajmer was originally known as Ajayameru. The city was founded by an 11th-century Chahamana king, Ajaydeva. Historian Dasharatha Sharma notes that the earliest mention of the city's name occurs in Palha's Pattavali, which was copied in 1113 CE (1170 VS) at Dhara. This suggests that Ajmer was founded sometime before 1113 CE. A prashasti (eulogistic inscription), issued by Vigraharaja IV and found at Adhai Din Ka Jhonpra (Sanskrit college), states Ajayadeva (that is Ajayaraja II) moved his residence to Ajmer.

A later text, Prabandha-Kosha states that it was the 8th-century king Ajayaraja I who commissioned the Ajayameru fort, which later came to be known as the Taragarh fort of Ajmer. According to historian R. B. Singh, this claim appears to be true, as inscriptions dated to the 8th century CE have been found at Ajmer. Singh theorises that Ajayaraja II later expanded the town area, constructed palaces, and moved the Chahamana capital from Shakambhari to Ajmer.

In 1193, Ajmer was annexed by the Ghurids and later was returned to Gaur Rajput rulers under condition of tribute.

By the 15th century, Ajmer was captured by Mewar and in 1506, Ajja Jhala was appointed as the Governor of Ajmer.

In 1556, Ajmer came under the Mughal Empire after being conquered by Mughal Emperor Akbar. It was made the capital of the eponymous Ajmer Subah. The city enjoyed special favour under the Mughals, who made frequent pilgrimages to the city to visit the dargah of Moinuddin Chishti. The city was also used as a military base for campaigns against Rajput rulers and, on a number of occasions, became the site of celebration when a campaign bore success. Mughal Emperors and their nobles made generous donations to the city, and endowed it with constructions such as Akbar's palace and pavilions along the Ana Sagar. Their most prominent building activities were in the dargah and its vicinity. Jahanara Begum and Dara Shikoh, children of Shah Jahan, were both born in the city in 1614 and 1615, respectively.

Mughal patronage of the city had waned by the beginning of the 18th century. In 1752, the Scindias conquered the city, and in 1818, the British gained authority over the city. A municipality was established at Ajmer in 1866. Colonial-era Ajmer served as the headquarters of the Ajmer-Merwara Province and possessed a Central jail, a large General Hospital, and two smaller hospitals, according to Gazetteer, 1908. It was the headquarters of a native regiment and of a Railway Volunteer corps. From the 1900s, the United Free Church of Scotland, the church of England, the Roman Catholics, and the American Episcopal Methodists have had mission establishments here. At that time there were twelve printing presses in the city, from which eight weekly newspapers were published.

At the time of India's independence in 1947, Ajmer continued as a separate state with its own legislature until its merger with erstwhile Rajputana province, then called Rajasthan. The Legislature of Ajmer State was housed in the building which now houses T. T. College. It had 30 MLAs, and Haribhau Upadhyay was the first chief minister of the erstwhile state, with Bhagirath Chaudhary as the first Vidhan Sabha speaker. In 1956, after acceptance of the proposal by Fazil Ali, Ajmer was merged into Rajasthan to form Ajmer District with the addition of Kishangarh sub-division of Jaipur district.

== Geography ==
Ajmer is in the northwest of India and is surrounded by the Aravali Mountains. It is situated on the lower slopes of the Taragarh Hill of that range. To the northwest is the Nagapathar Range of the Aravali Mountain Ranges which protects it from desertification from the Thar Desert.

=== Climate ===
Ajmer has a hot, semi-arid climate with over 55 centimetres (22 inches) of rain every year, but most of the rain occurs in the monsoon months, between June and September. Temperatures remain relatively high throughout the year, with the summer months of April to early July having an average daily temperature of about 30 °C (86 °F). During the monsoon there is frequent heavy rain and thunderstorms, but flooding is not a common occurrence. The winter months of November to February are mild and temperate with average temperatures ranging from 15–18 °C (59–64 °F) with little or no humidity. There are, however, occasional cold weather fronts that cause temperatures to fall to near freezing levels.

Climate data for Ajmer (1991–2020 normals, extremes 1901–2020)
Month	Jan	Feb	Mar	Apr	May	Jun	Jul	Aug	Sep	Oct	Nov	Dec	Year
Record high °C (°F)	32.6 (90.7)	36.8 (98.2)	42.3 (108.1)	44.6 (112.3)	47.4 (117.3)	46.4 (115.5)	44.4 (111.9)	42.3 (108.1)	42.0 (107.6)	42.0 (107.6)	37.4 (99.3)	34.2 (93.6)	47.4 (117.3)
Mean maximum °C (°F)	29.1 (84.4)	32.4 (90.3)	38.0 (100.4)	41.9 (107.4)	43.6 (110.5)	43.2 (109.8)	39.1 (102.4)	36.0 (96.8)	38.0 (100.4)	37.6 (99.7)	34.1 (93.4)	30.1 (86.2)	43.9 (111.0)
Mean daily maximum °C (°F)	23.9 (75.0)	27.2 (81.0)	32.5 (90.5)	37.6 (99.7)	40.3 (104.5)	38.7 (101.7)	34.1 (93.4)	32.0 (89.6)	33.6 (92.5)	34.5 (94.1)	30.2 (86.4)	26.1 (79.0)	32.7 (90.9)
Mean daily minimum °C (°F)	10.1 (50.2)	13.5 (56.3)	18.8 (65.8)	24.4 (75.9)	28.0 (82.4)	27.8 (82.0)	26.1 (79.0)	24.8 (76.6)	24.3 (75.7)	21.1 (70.0)	15.9 (60.6)	11.4 (52.5)	20.7 (69.3)
Mean minimum °C (°F)	5.4 (41.7)	7.8 (46.0)	17.4 (63.3)	17.4 (63.3)	21.8 (71.2)	22.2 (72.0)	22.7 (72.9)	22.5 (72.5)	21.5 (70.7)	16.2 (61.2)	10.7 (51.3)	6.3 (43.3)	5.2 (41.4)
Record low °C (°F)	−2.8 (27.0)	−1.1 (30.0)	2.2 (36.0)	9.4 (48.9)	14.3 (57.7)	14.7 (58.5)	14.4 (57.9)	18.9 (66.0)	14.6 (58.3)	7.8 (46.0)	2.8 (37.0)	−0.6 (30.9)	−2.8 (27.0)
Average rainfall mm (inches)	4.9 (0.19)	7.3 (0.29)	3.1 (0.12)	6.6 (0.26)	20.4 (0.80)	61.0 (2.40)	182.2 (7.17)	180.6 (7.11)	86.7 (3.41)	15.6 (0.61)	1.1 (0.04)	1.8 (0.07)	571.4 (22.50)
Average rainy days	0.4	0.7	0.4	0.9	1.7	3.8	8.8	9.2	4.1	0.9	0.1	0.2	31.2
Average ultraviolet index	5	6	7	9	9	8	7	7	7	6	6	5	7
Source 1: India Meteorological Department Climate of Ajmer
Source 2: Weather Atlas

== Demographics ==
Religions in Ajmer
Religion	Percent
Hindus	83.53%
Muslims	11.58%
Jains	2.50%
Sikhs	0.94%
Others	0.18%

Historical population
Year	Pop.	±%
1891	68,800	—
1901	73,800	+7.3%
1911	86,200	+16.8%
1921	113,200	+31.3%
1931	119,500	+5.6%
1941	147,300	+23.3%
1951	196,300	+33.3%
1961	231,200	+17.8%
1968	265,200	+14.7%
1971	264,300	−0.3%
1981	374,400	+41.7%
1991	402,700	+7.6%
2001	485,197	+20.5%
2011	542,321	+11.8%

According to the 2011 census, Ajmer had a population of 542,321 in the city, 551,101 including its suburbs.

The female to male ratio in the city was 947/1,000. The literacy rate in the city was 86.52%, male literacy being 92.08% and female literacy being 80.69%.

Ajmer's population growth in the decade was 18.48%; this compares to a growth figure of 20.93% in the previous decade.

== Government and politics ==
=== Administration ===
The Ajmer Municipal Corporation was established in year 1866 and is the oldest municipal body of Rajasthan. The first chairman of the then Council was Major Davidson. The Municipal Corporation is administered under the Rajasthan Municipality Act of 1959. The municipal administration has been decentralised between Ajmer North and Ajmer South which have 39 wards and 41 wards respectively. So there are 80 municipal wards in total currently. Shri Gaurav Budhaniya is the Municipal Commissioner of Ajmer and the Mayor is Smt. Anamika Sharma. The Ajmer Municipal Corporation undertakes the collection and record of property taxes.

Divisional commissioner of Ajmer is Bhanwar Lal Mehra and district collector is Veer Pratap Singh. Shri Deshal Dan, IAS is the Municipal Commissioner of Ajmer.

As per the Ministry of Housing and Urban Affairs, the Ajmer Municipal Corporation reported a revenue of ₹159 crore and an expenditure of ₹207 crore in 2022–23. Taxes contributed to 3.1% of the revenue, with 96.9% of the income coming from other sources.

=== Villages ===
- Ajaysar Village, Rajasthan, located in Srinagar block of Ajmer district
- Ashok Nagar Ajmer (1989), colony

== Tourism ==
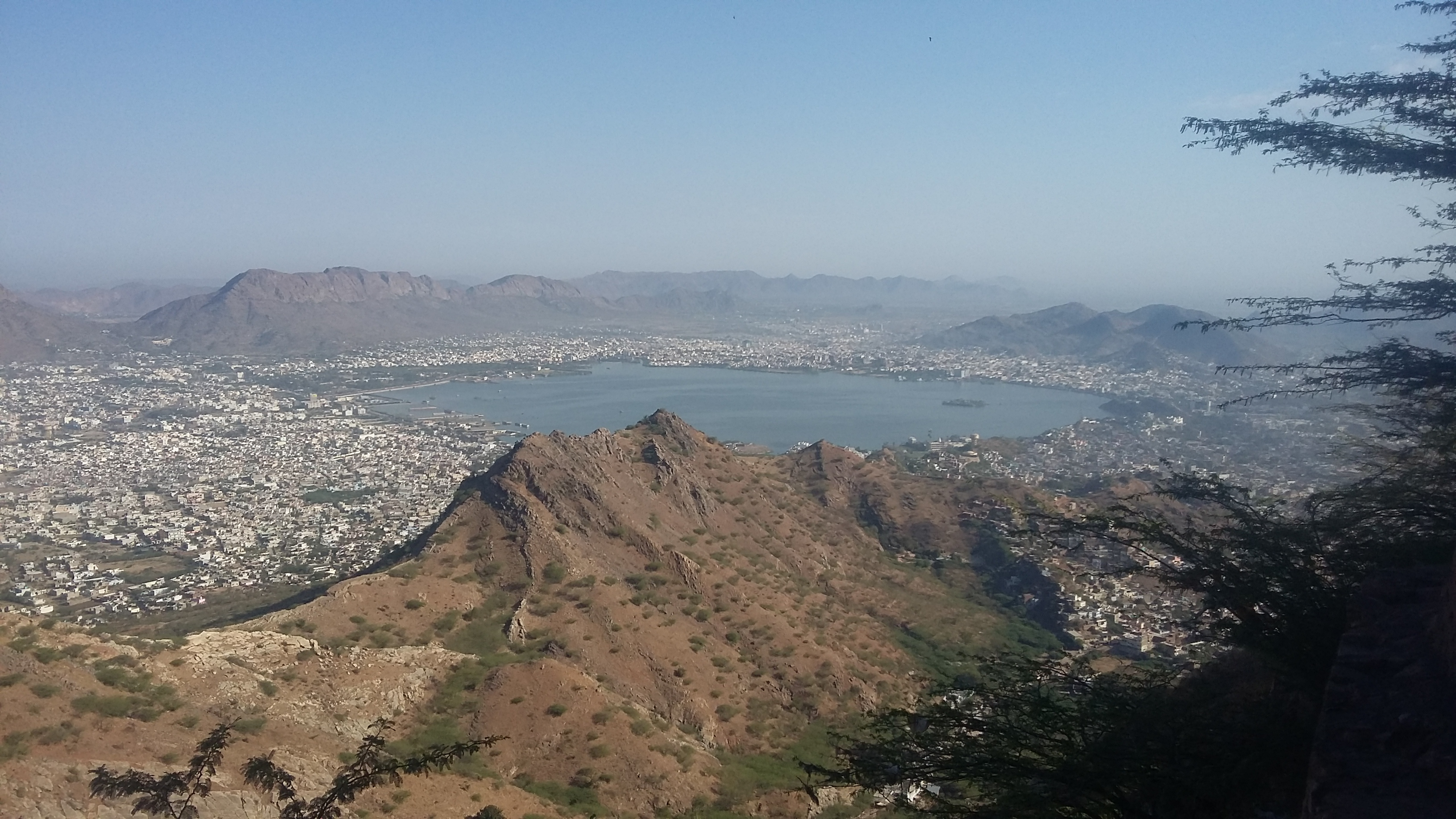
View of Ajmer from Taragarh Fort

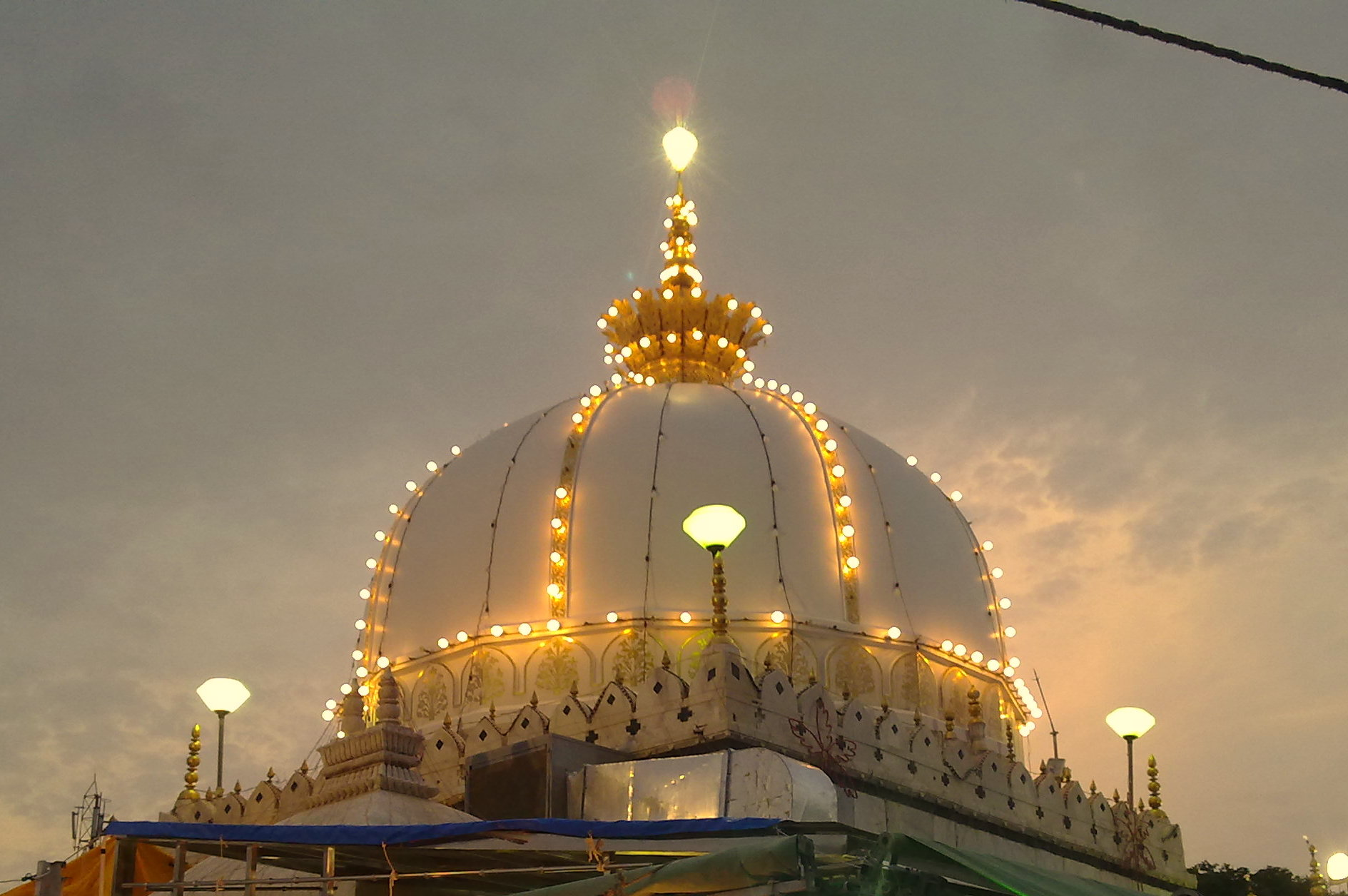
Dargah Sharif Ajmer

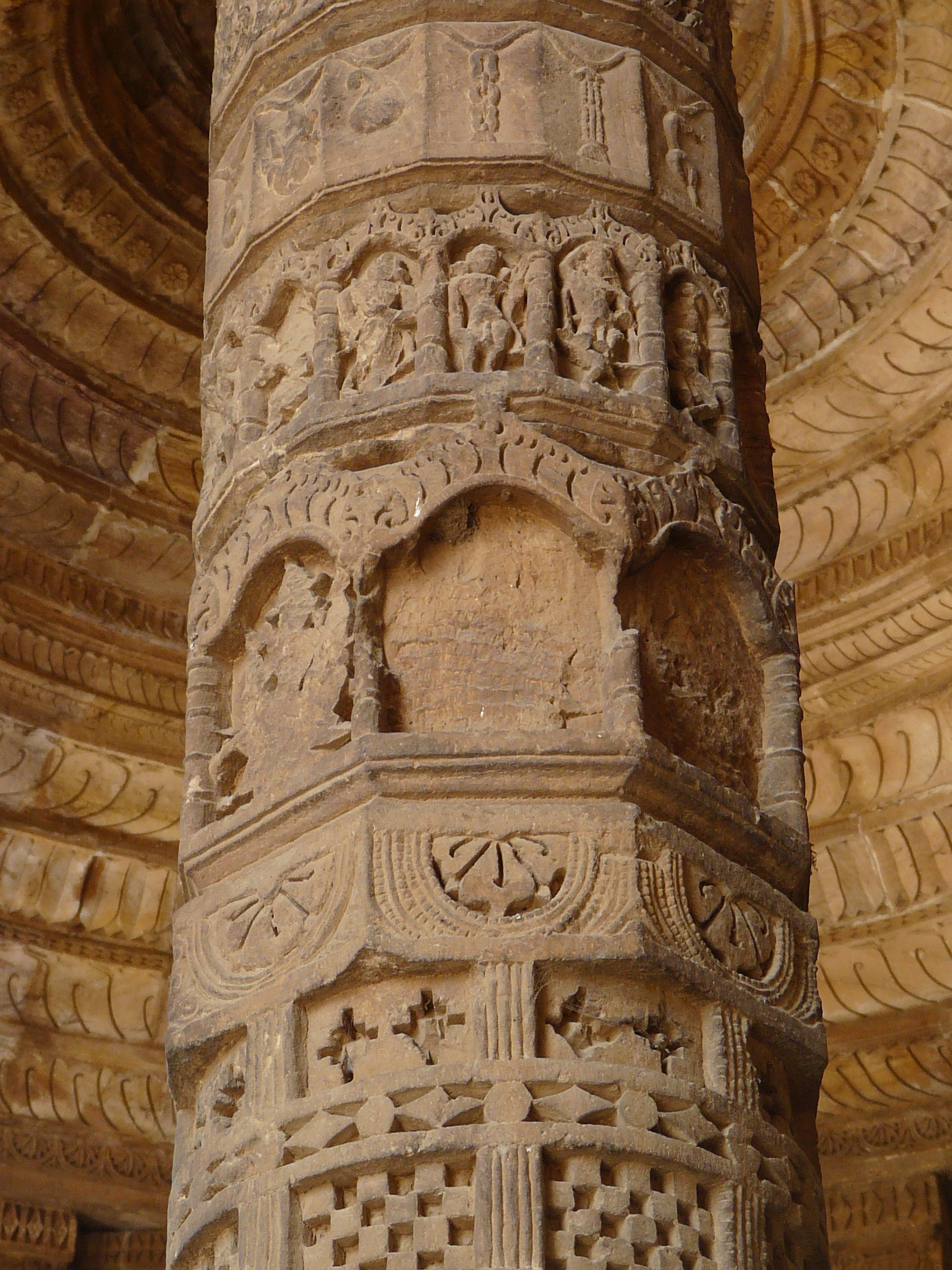
Remnants of Jain and Hindu temple in converted Adhai Din Ka Jhopara Monument.

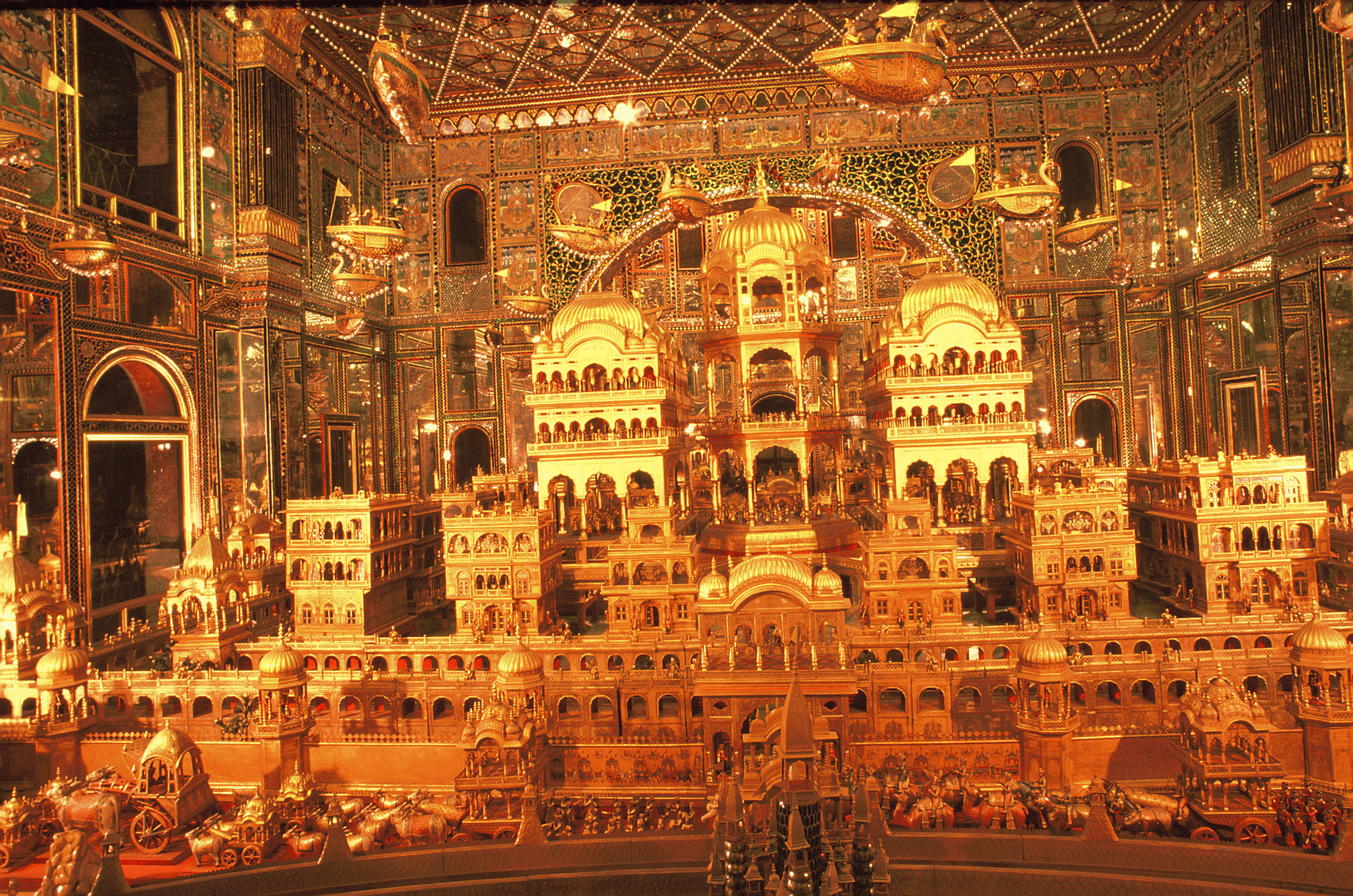
Swarna Nagari Ayodhya in Soniji Ki Nasiyan

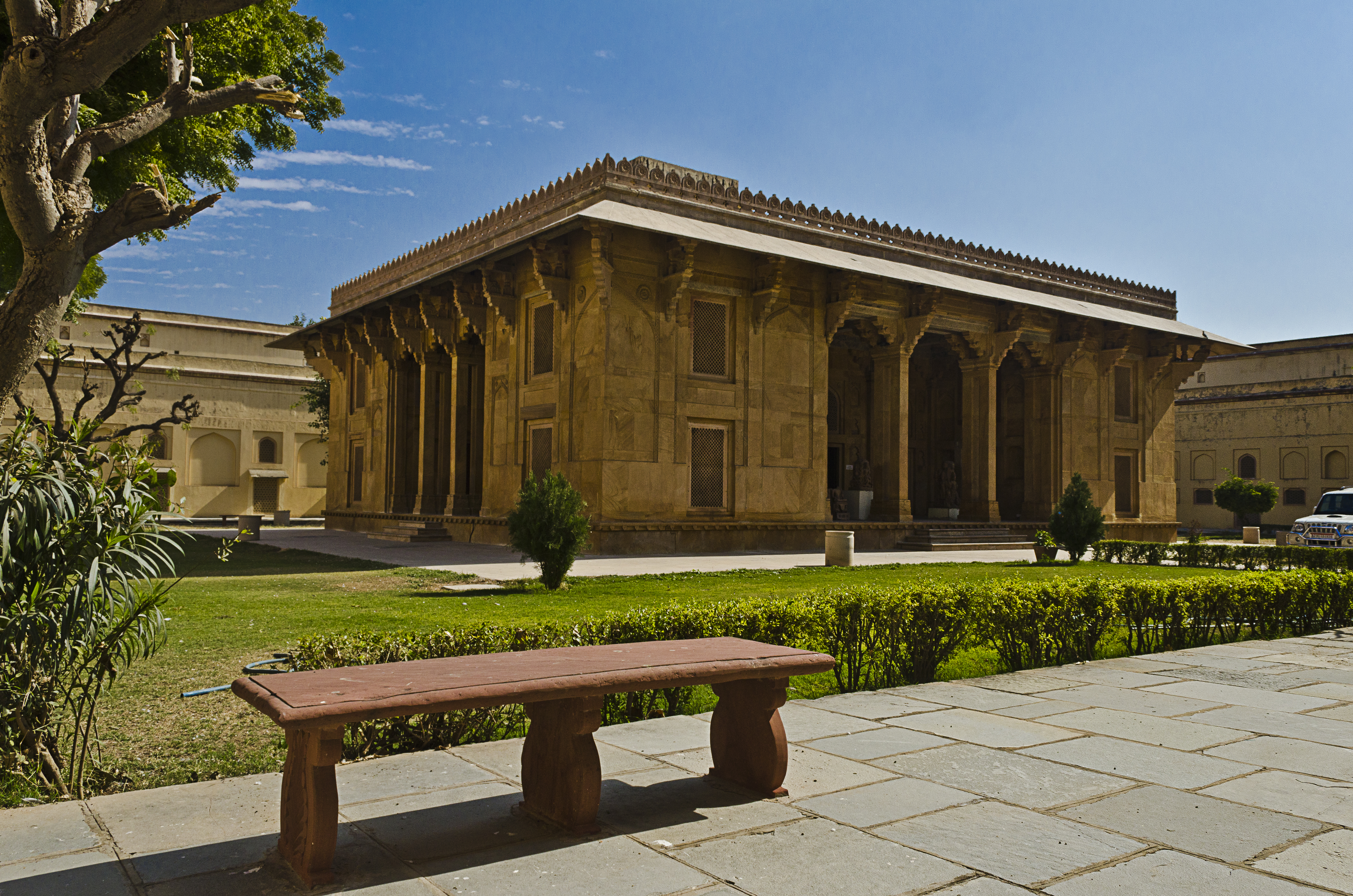
Akbari Fort and Museum

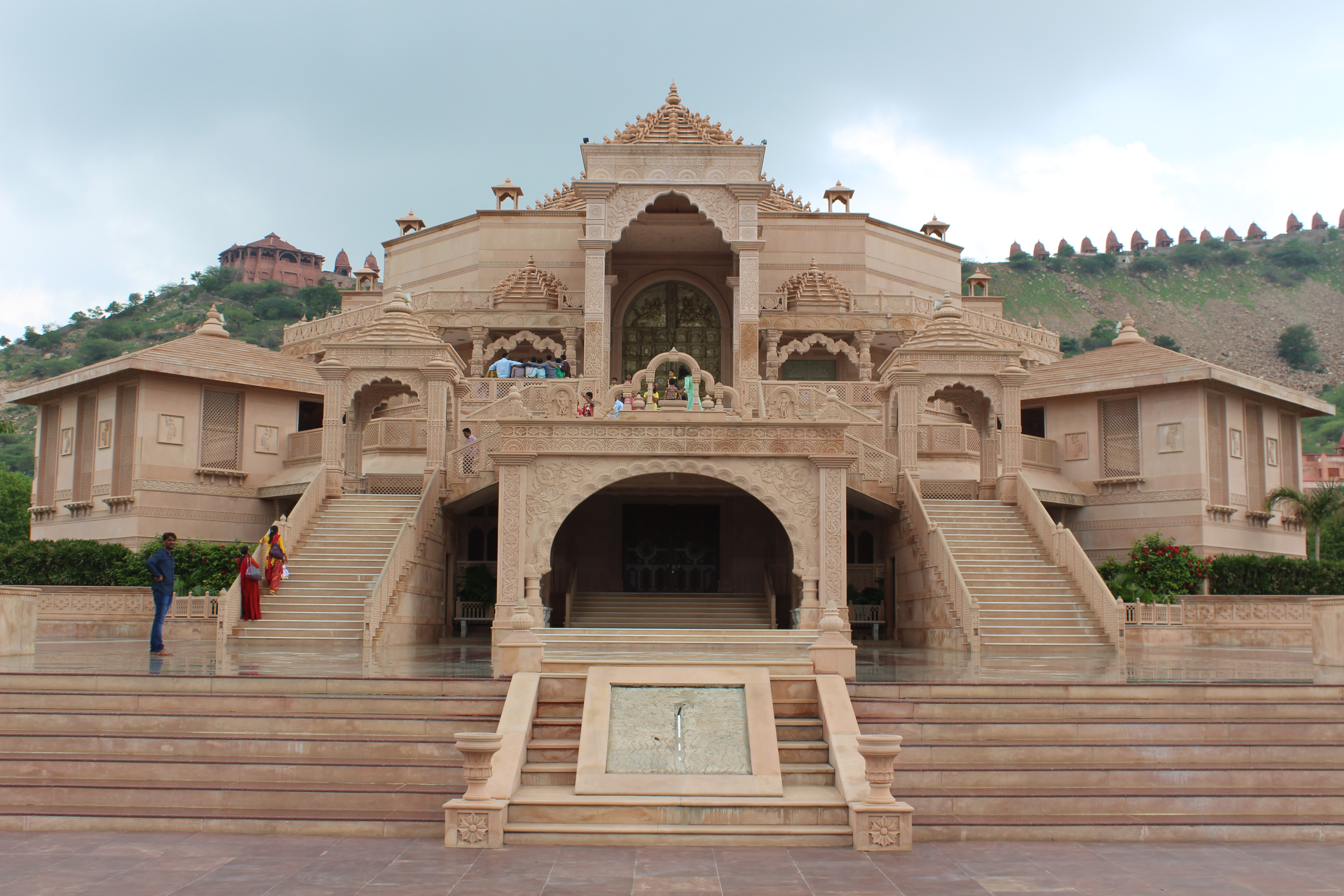
Nareli Jain Temple is a recent addition to Ajmer

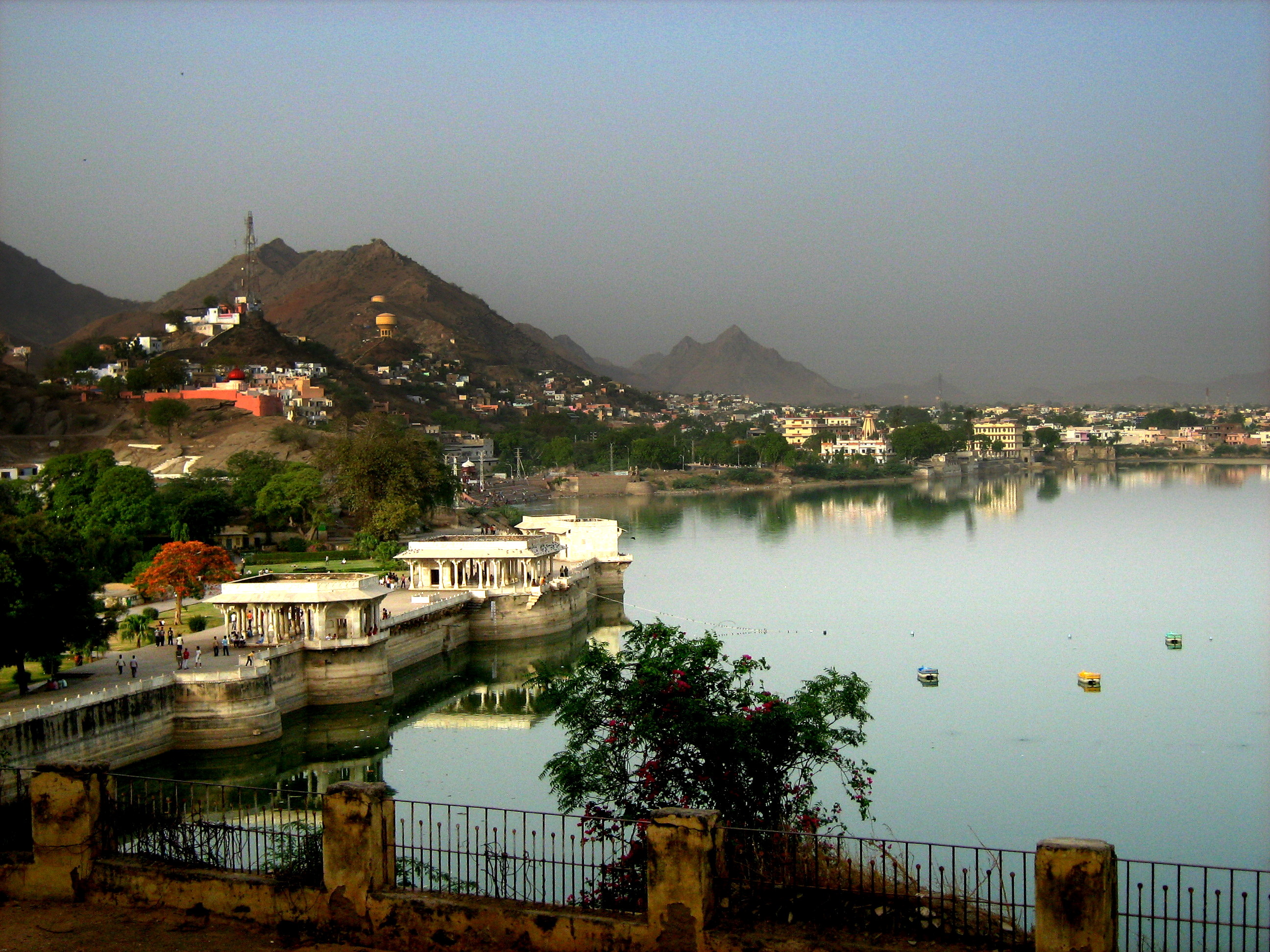
Baradari on Lake Anasagar

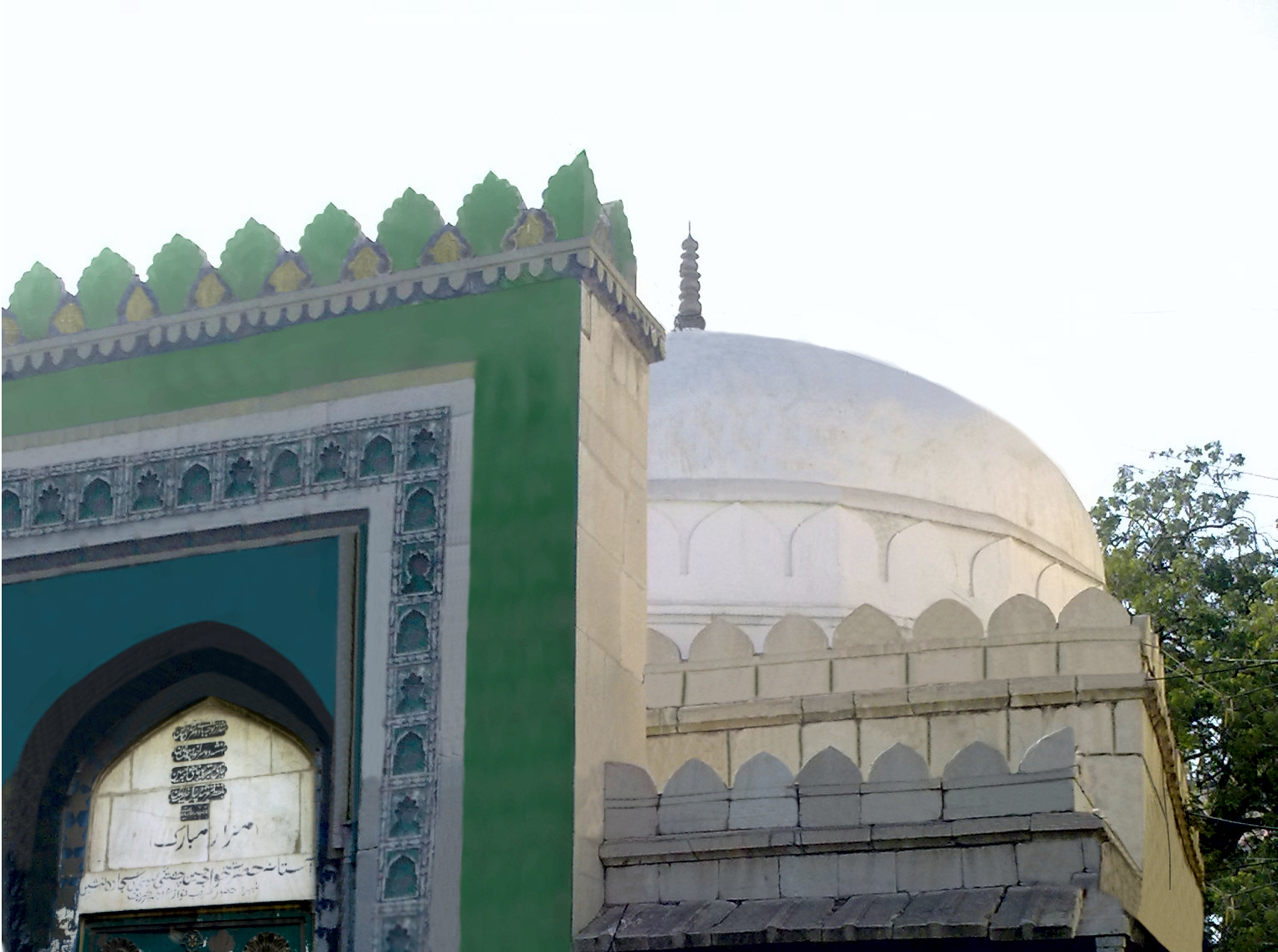
Tomb of Khwaja Husain Ajmeri

- Pushkar: Located a few kilometres from Ajmer, it is an important tourist and pilgrimage destination and a satellite town of Ajmer city. It is famous for the Pushkar Lake and the 14th century Brahma Temple at Pushkar, dedicated to Brahma. According to the Padma Purana, Pushkar is an important pilgrimage site of Brahma, and is regarded to be the only major shrine dedicated to the deity.
- Taragarh Fort: It is reputed to be the oldest hill fort in India. It stands, with precipitous surroundings, at a height of 2,855 ft. above sea-level, and between 1,300 and 1,400 ft. above the valley at its base; and it is partially enclosed by a wall some 20 feet thick and as many high, built of huge blocks of stone, cut and squared and are about two miles (3 km) in circumference. This hill fort guarding Ajmer, was the seat of the Chauhan rulers. It was built by King Ajaypal Chauhan on the summit of Taragarh Hill and overlooks Ajmer. The battlements run along the top of the hill. When it fell to the British Raj, the fort was dismantled on the orders of Lord William Bentinck in 1832 and was converted into a sanatorium for the British troops stationed at the garrison town of Nasirabad. Within it stands the shrine of a Muhammadan saint, Saiyid Husain, known as the Ganj Shahldan.In the older city, lying in the valley beneath the Taragarh hill and now abandoned, the Nur-chashma, a garden-house used by the Mughals, still remains, as also a water-lift commenced by Maldeo Rathor, to raise water to the Taragarh citadel.
- Ajmer Sharif Dargah: It is a shrine of Khwaja Moinuddin Chishti which is situated at the foot of the Taragarh hill, and consists of several white marble buildings arranged around two courtyards, including a massive gate donated by the Nizam of Hyderabad, and the Akbari Mosque, built by the Mughal emperor Shah Jahan and containing the domed tomb of the saint. Akbar and his queen used to come here by foot every year on pilgrimage from Agra in observance of a vow when he prayed for a son. The large pillars called "Kose ('Mile') Minars" (Kos Minar), erected at intervals of about two miles (3 km) along the entire way between Agra and Ajmer mark the places where the royal pilgrims halted every day, they are also seen today, one such is near private bus station in Ajmer City. About 125,000 pilgrims visit the site every day. The Urs of Khwaja Moinuddin Chishti is celebrated every year on the 6th and 7th of Rajab.
- Adhai Din Ka Jhonpra: Literally meaning "shed of two-and-a-half days", it is an ASI protected monument near Ajmer Sharif Dargah and a converted mosque built after the partial destruction of earlier Hindu and Jain temples there on orders of Muhammad Ghori after he defeated Prithviraj Chauhan at the second battle of Tarain.Originally built as a Sanskrit college, the mosque underwent a transformative evolution in the 12th century under the reign of Qutb-ud-Din-Aibak.
- Mayo College: The college was founded in 1875 at the suggestion of Lord Mayo as a college where the sons of chiefs and nobles might receive an education to fit them for their high positions and important duties. It was known as "Indian Eton", as a number of Indian princes studied in this college. The main building, in white marble, is a classic example of Indo-Saracenic architecture. In front of the college is memorial marble statue of Lord Mayo. The boarding-houses are arranged in the form of a horseshoe, with the college in the centre of the base. Some of the Native States built boarding-houses, while the Government of India presented the college park, comprising 167 acres and formerly the site of the old Residency, and erected the main building, the residences of the principal and vice-principal, and the Ajmer boarding- house. It provided the salaries of the English staff. The foundation-stone of the college was laid in 1878, and the building was opened by the Marquis of Dufferin in 1885. John Lockwood Kipling, father of Nobel Laureate, Rudyard Kipling, had been principal of Mayo College.
- Soni Ji Ki Nasiyaan: It is architecturally rich Jain temple built in the late nineteenth century whose main chamber Swarna Nagari "City of Gold", has prominent depiction of Ayodhya made from 1000 kg of gold.
- Akbari Fort & Museum: The city's museum was once the residence of Prince Salīm, the son of the Emperor Akbar, and presently houses a collection of Mughal and Rajput armour and sculpture. This is a magnificent example of Mughal architecture, construction of which was commissioned by Akbar in 1570. This is where Salim, as the Emperor Jahangir, read out the firman permitting the British East India Company to trade with India. It is a massive square building, with lofty octagonal bastions at each corner. It was the headquarters of the administration in their time and in that of the Marathas. It was here that the emperors appeared in state, and that, as recorded by Sir Thomas Roe, criminals were publicly executed. The interior was used as a magazine during the British occupation until 1857; and the central building, used as a tahsil office. With the fort, the outer city walls, of the same period, are connected. These surround the city and are pierced by the Delhi, Madar, Usri, Agra, and Tirpolia gates.
- Nareli Jain Temple: is a Jain temple complex of fourteen temples recently built. It is known for its architecture and intricate stone carvings which gives it both a traditional and contemporary look.
- Ana Sagar Lake: This is a historic man-made lake built by Maharaja Anaji (1135–1150 CE). By the lake is the Daulat Bagh, a garden laid out by Emperor Jahangir. Emperor Shah Jahan later added five pavilions, known as the Baradari, between the garden and the lake embankment of the Ana Sagar supports the beautiful marble pavilions erected as pleasure-houses by Shah Jahan. The embankment, moreover, contains the - site of the former hammam (bath-room). Three of the five pavilions were at one time formed into residences for British officials, while the embankment was covered with office buildings and enclosed by gardens. The houses and enclosures were finally removed in 1900–1902, when the two south pavilions were re-erected, the marble parapet completed, and the embankment restored, as far as practicable, to its early condition. The Baradari has since been closed for the public because of increased crowd and pollution caused by people.A new garden called Subhash Udhyan has been opened in the recent years in place of Baradari.
- Lake Foy Sagar: It is a picturesque artificial lake that was created as a famine relief project in 1892 some 3 miles to the west of the city. It offers excellent views of Aravali mountains range as well migrating birds. The city used to derive its water-supply from it during colonial times. The water was conveyed into the city and suburbs through pipes which were laid underground. The capacity of the lake is 150,000,000 cubic feet.
- Prithviraj Smark: Prithviraj Smark is dedicated to Prithviraj Chauhan. It is located on the way to Taragarh Fort. This place has a life-size statue of King Prithviraj Chauhan mounted on a horse.

== Transportation ==
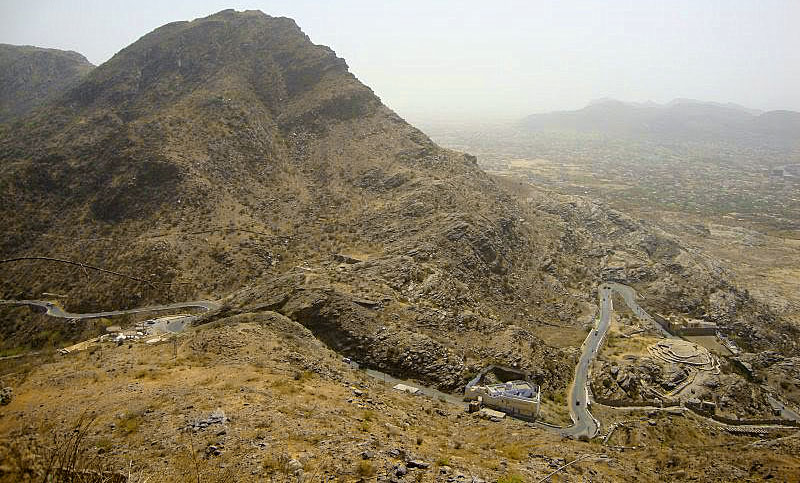
Pushkar Valley that connects Pushkar and Ajmer in the Aravalli Mountains

=== Air ===
The Kishangarh Airport is the nearest airport. It is 25 km from Ajmer city. The Ajmer Airport ground breaking ceremony was done by then Prime Minister of India Manmohan Singh in 2012. The airport was finally completed and inaugurated by then Union Minister of State for Civil Aviation Jayant Sinha and Chief Minister Vasundhara Raje on 11 October 2017. The airport is operational since then and regular flights to/from Delhi, Mumbai, Hyderabad, Ahmedabad, Indore and Surat are currently available. The airport is now among main and busy airports of Rajasthan. Currently SpiceJet and Star Air operate from Ajmer Airport on daily basis. Kishangarh Airport, Ajmer is being managed and operated by Airports Authority of India (AAI).

The Jaipur International Airport which is 135 km from Ajmer is the nearest international airport.

=== Rail ===
The Ajmer Junction is the main railway station situated in the city. It was built during colonial times.

== Education ==
The city has many schools and colleges. Among them, Mayo College is a prominent college. The regional office of CBSE is located here.

== Notable people ==
- Sufiya Sufi (1987–), an Indian sprint athlete.
- Basu Chatterjee (1927–), an Indian film director and screenwriter in Hindi and Bengali cinema through the 1970s and 1980s.

== See also ==
- Delhi Gate, Ajmer
- Ajmeri Gate
  - Ajmeri Gate metro station
- Qabil Ajmeri
- Ajmeri Kalakand
- Marwari language, also known as Ajmeri, spoken around Marwar and Ajmer
