= Delhi Gate =

Delhi Gate may refer to:

== Gates ==
- Delhi Gate, Agra Fort, Uttar Pradesh, India
- Delhi Gate, Ajmer, Rajasthan, India
- Delhi Gate, Arcot, Tamil Nadu, India
- Delhi Gate, Aurangabad, Maharashtra, India
- Delhi Gate, Delhi, India
  - Delhi Gate metro station
- Delhi Gate, Red Fort, Delhi, India
- Delhi Gate, Lahore, Pakistan

== Other uses ==
- Delhi Gate (film), a 2018 Pakistani film

== See also ==
- Lahori Gate (disambiguation)
- Kashmiri Gate (disambiguation)
