= Nareli Jain Temple =

Jain temple near Ajmer, Rajasthan, India

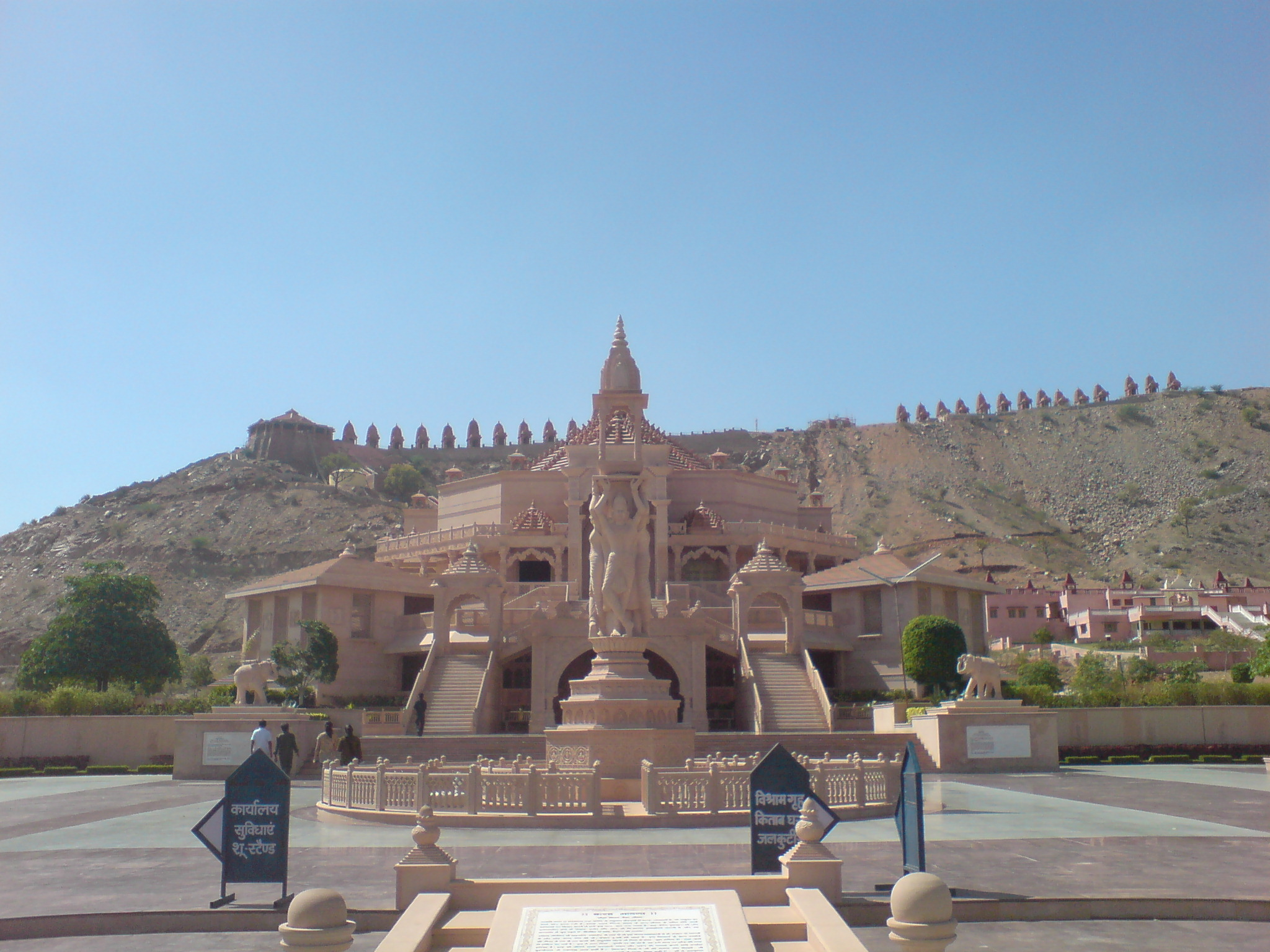
- Shri Gyanodaya Tirth Kshetra

- Location within Rajasthan

Religion
- Affiliation: Jainism
- Sect: Digambara
- Deity: Rishabhanatha
- Festival: Mahavir Jayanti

Location
- Location: Nareli, Ajmer, Rajasthan, India
- Coordinates: 26°27′32″N 74°42′16″E

Architecture
- Creator: Ashok Patni, Dinnath Jain, RK Marbels
- Established: 1994
- Temple: 25

Nareli Jain Temple or Shri Gyanodaya Tirth Kshetra, is a new Jain temple located on the outskirts of Ajmer 7 kilometers from the city center and 128 kilometers west of Jaipur on the main national highway 8.

== History ==
Ashok Patni of RK Marbles constructed this temple. The temple is situated on the Aravali mountain range. The temple was estimated to cost around Rupees 50 crore, but ended up costing close to Rupees 100 crore. The main temple was built by Dinnath ji Jain after him the construction is completed by Deepak Jain and his family

== About temple ==
The temple is an important Jain pilgrimage site for Digambar Jains. The temple complex consists 24 small Jinalaya for 24 tirthankars.

Gavin Thomas, in his book, "The Rough Guide to Rajasthan, Delhi & Agra" (2010, p. 257), writes on Nareli Jain Temple:

"There's another striking monument to the Jain faith some 7km southeast of Ajmer on the Jaipur bypass, the angular modern Nareli Temple, a striking edifice mixing traditional and contemporary architectural styles to somewhat quirky effect, with 23 further miniature temples lined up on the hill above."

The other Jain temple that the author talks about is the Ajmer Jain Temple.

== Transportation ==
- Road-

It lies on the main national highway no. 8 which is a 6 lane expressway from Jaipur onwards and connects the Delhi-Ajmer-Mumbai. Autos and taxis are available from Ajmer and nearby towns.

- Rail-

Nearest railway station is Ajmer junction which is an important railway junction with broad gauge lines.

- Air-

Presently the nearest airport is the Kishangarh Airport but it has limited connectivity. The next best option is Jaipur International Airport, which is about 125 km away, with daily flights to the major cities in India and certain international flights.

== Gallery ==
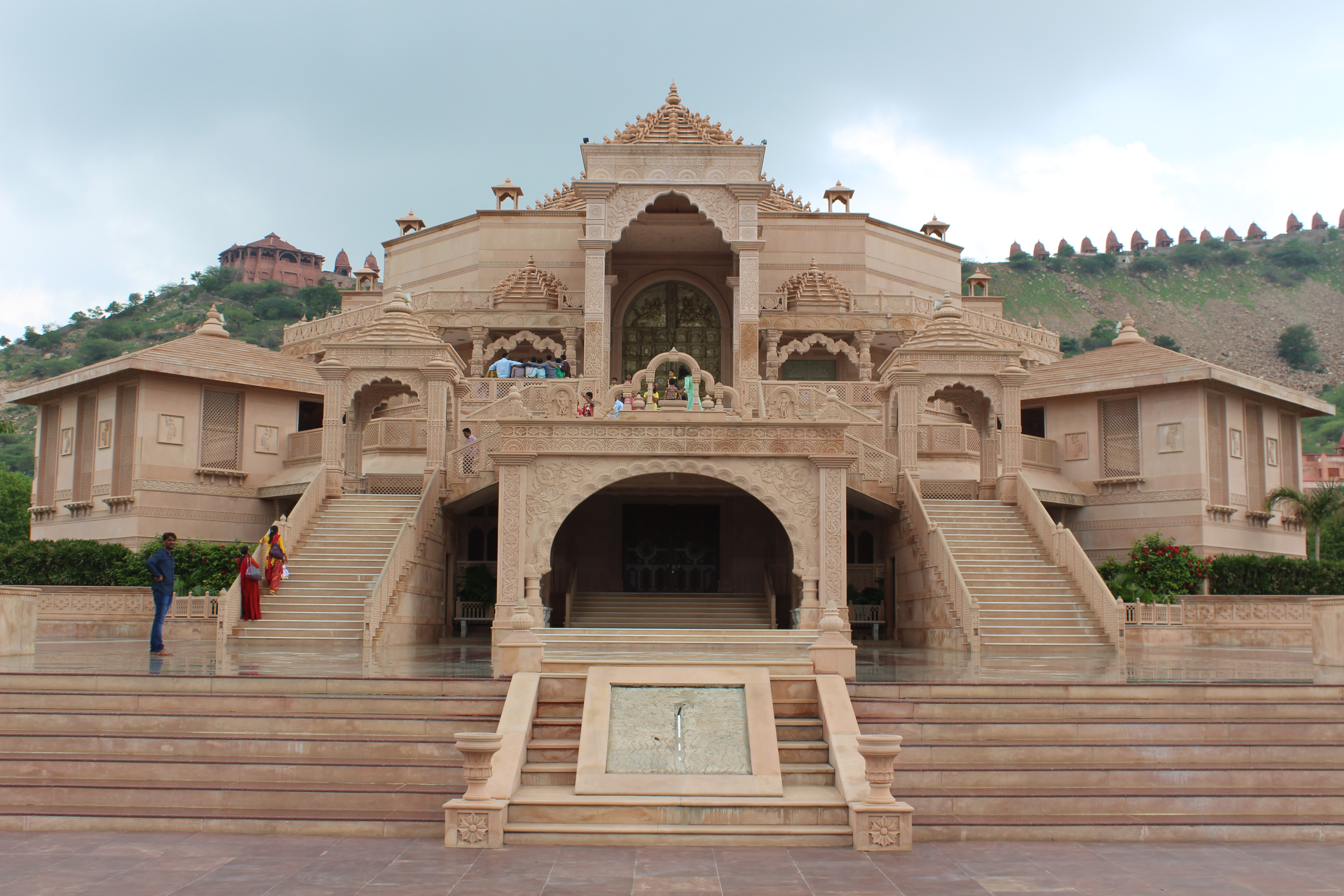
Temple Entrance

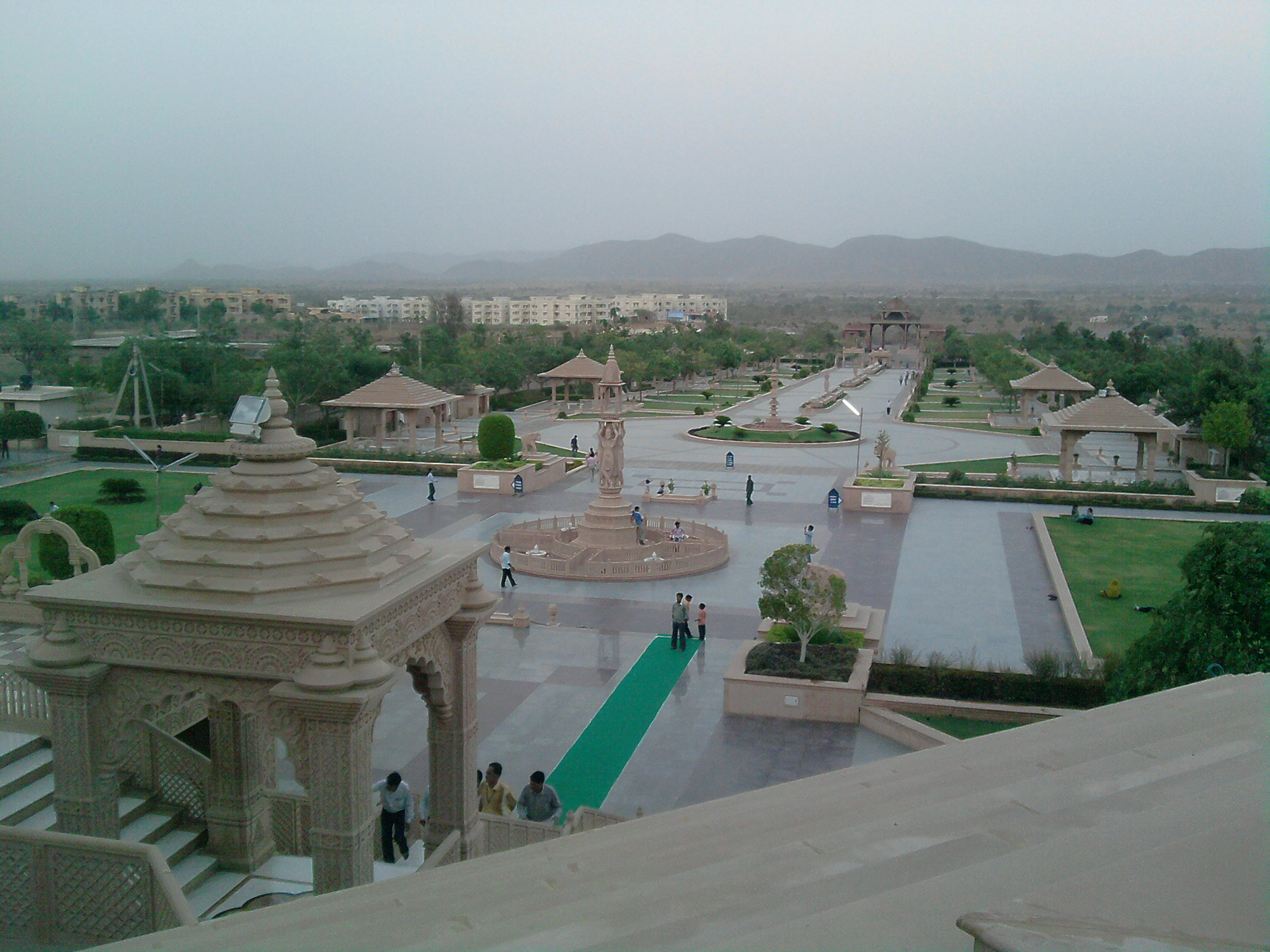
Nareli Jain Temple

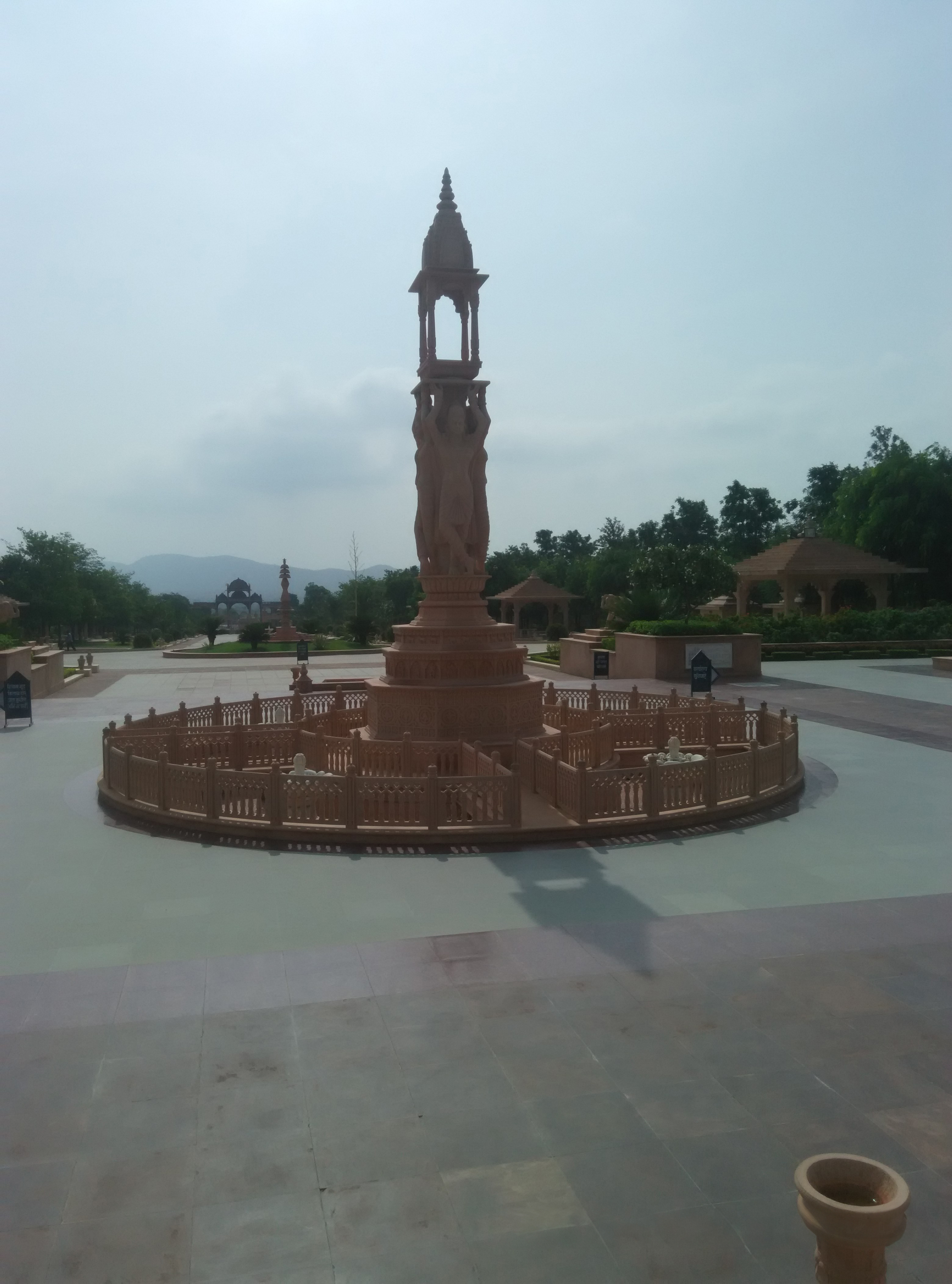
Manstambh

== See also ==
- Ajmer Jain temple
- Jainism in Rajasthan
