= Kashmiri Gate =

Kashmiri Gate may refer to:

- Kashmiri Gate, Delhi, the northern gate to the Walled City of Delhi (Old Delhi)
  - Kashmiri Gate Inter State Bus Terminus, a bus station in Delhi
- Kashmiri Gate, Lahore, one of the thirteen gates of the Walled City of Lahore

== See also ==
- Delhi Gate (disambiguation)
- Lahori Gate (disambiguation)
