= Ashok Nagar Ajmer =

Indian colony

Ashok Nagar is a small colony of more than 1000 homes in Ajmer city in Rajasthan, India. The colony was founded in 1989 and since then more than 100 plots have been occupied.

== Description ==
Ashok Nagar did not have road and water supply connections in homes until 1996. In 1998, the road was constructed and the connection with the Beawar and Nasirabad roads was assured.

The colony is located in the middle of the two state highways in Ajmer. One of them goes to Beawar-Udaipur and the other goes to Bhilwara, Chittorgarh and Udaipur. The colony now has all the facilities available. City bus, Tempo and Rickshaw are available for moving to any part in the city.
