= Lahori Gate =

Lahori Gate may refer to:

- Lahori Gate, Red Fort, Delhi, the entrance of the Red Fort, Delhi, India
- Lahori Gate, of the Walled City of Shahjahanabad, was one of the historic gates of Shahjahanabad
- Lahori Gate, Lahore. one of the 13 gates of the Walled City of Lahore
- Lahori Gate (TV series), a Pakistani comedy drama serial that aired on PTV Home

== See also ==
- Delhi Gate (disambiguation)
- Kashmiri Gate (disambiguation)
