= Sufiya Sufi =

Indian sprint athlete

Personal information
- Born: 1987 (age 38–39) Ajmer, Rajasthan

Sport
- Country: India
- Sport: Sprint (running)

Sufiya Sufi (born 1987) is an Indian sprint athlete from Ajmer, Rajasthan. She is the first female runner to complete Manali to Leh Ultramarathon in 2021.

== Early life ==
Sufiya was born in Ajmer in 1987. Her father died when she was 16, after which she was raised by her single mother.

== Career ==
Sufia quit her job in 2017 and embarked on a journey, running all the way from Kashmir to Kanyakumari. She accomplished a remarkable 6000 km race, covering four major cities in just 110 days. After that, Sufia set her sights on covering a distance of approximately 480 km between Manali and Leh. She successfully accomplished this feat in just seven days.

== Guinness ==
The Guinness Book of World Records, confirmed her as the fastest runner to run across Qatar (north to south), covering a distance of 200 kilometers in 30 hours and 31 minutes.

The Guinness World Record for Most Marathons Run in a Calendar Year by a Woman, in 2018.

The Manali-Leh stretch on foot. She completed the 485 km distance in 6 days, 12 hours, and 6 minutes, making her the fastest female to cover the distance.

The Guinness record for setting the fastest time by a female to complete the Golden Quadrilateral, a network of highways connecting Delhi, Kolkata, Mumbai, and Chennai, in 2021. Sufiya had then covered the 6002-km distance in 110 days, 23 hours, and 24 minutes.

The Guinness record for being the fastest woman to traverse from Kashmir to Kanyakumari in 2019, running the length in 87 days, 2 hours, and 17 minutes.
