= Delhi Gate, Ajmer =

Delhi Gate
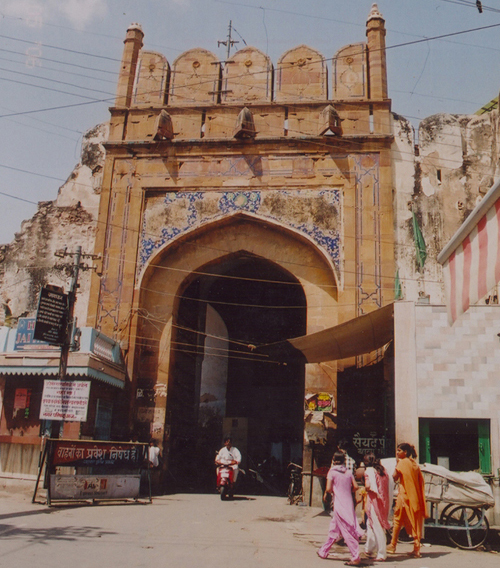

- Location within Rajasthan
- 26.4621°N 74.6276°E
- Location: Ajmer, Rajasthan, India

History
- Built: 1571
- Built for: Mughal Royal Family

Site notes
- Architectural style: Islamic
- Restored by: Archaeological Survey of India
- Governing body: Archeological Survey of India

Delhi Gate is a massive arched gateway leading to Dargah Sharif, Ajmer, with pillared hall on right side which has to be used by guards. The Gateway was constructed by Mughal Emperor Akbar in 1571 AD. The Monument is under Archeological Survey of India.
