= Lakshmanaraja I =

Lakshmana-raja (IAST: Lakṣmaṇa-rāja, r.c. 825-850 CE) was a king of the Kalachuri dynasty of Tripuri in central India. He appears to have been a vassal of the Rashtrakuta king Amogha-varsha.

== Reign ==
The chronology of the early Kalachuri kings of Tripuri is not clear, and no information is available about Lakshamana-raja's immediate predecessors. Based on epigraphic evidence, historians date his reign to c. 825-850 CE; the last known predecessor of Lakshmana-raja is Shankara-gana I (r.c. 750-775 CE).

Before Lakshmana-raja's ascension, the Kalachuris appear to have accepted the suzerainty of their southern neighbours, the Rashtrakutas. This likely happened during the reign of the Rashtrakuta king Govinda III. According to the Rashtrakuta inscriptions, during the Tripartite Struggle, Govinda III invaded the region to the north of the Narmada River, and subjugated the Pratihara and the Pala kings. On his way back, he is said to have acquired control of several kingdoms and "made his servants rule them": one of these was probably the Kalachuri territory of Dahala. Lakshmana-raja's 841-842 CE Karitalai inscription attests that he was a vassal of Govinda's son Amogha-varsha. The inscription prefixes "Shri" to his name, and does not use the imperial titles "Parameshvara" and "Maharajadhiraja", which were used by his predecessors Vama-raja and Shankaragana I. The surviving text of the inscription does not provide much information about Lakshamana-raja's own reign, and instead eulogizes his overlord Amogha-varsha and mentions Govinda's defeat of the Pratihara king Naga-bhata II. The Kalachuris appear to have loyally served the Rashtrakutas in subsequent years, supporting their military campaigns and establishing matrimonial relations with them.

The next known king of the dynasty was Kokalla I (r. c. 850-890 CE). His relation to Lakshmana-raja is not known, although scholar V. V. Mirashi theorizes that he was a son of Lakshmana-raja. Mirashi did not have access to the Gyaraspur inscription of Kokalla's son Valleka, according to which Kokalla was the son of Voppa-raja (or Boppa-raja). According to scholar Richard G. Salomon, Lakshmana-raja may have been another name of Voppa-raja, or Lakshmana-raja may have been the father of Voppa-raja.

== Karitalai inscription ==
In 1928, archaeologist Rai Bahadur Hiralal noticed a Sanskrit-language inscription of Lakshmana-raja affixed to the temple of Devi Madhia at Karitalai. The inscription is fragmentary, but appears to have originally consisted of 13 verses. The introductory verses of the inscription invoke the deities Druhina (Brahma), Upendra (Vishnu), and Rudra (Shiva). The next few lines, now partially lost, appear to eulogize some persons. The inscription then mentions the rout of the Pratihara king Naga-bhata and praises the Rashtrakuta king Amogha-varsha.

The inscription is dated to the year 593 (of the Kalachuri era), corresponding to 841-842 CE. Hiralal wrongly read the date as 693, and assigned it to the reign of the later Kalachuri king Lakshmana-raja II. Historian V. V. Mirashi noticed this error, and assigned the inscription to the reign of Lakshmana-raja I. According to Mirashi, the lost portions of the inscription must have referred to Govinda III's victory over Naga-bhata II.
