= Vama-raja =

Vāma-rāja (c. 7th century), also known as Vāma-deva or Vāma-rāja-deva, was a ruler of the Kalachuri dynasty of central India.

The Sagar stone inscription of Shankaragana I and the Karitalai stone inscription of Lakshmana-rāja mention Vāma-rāja as the earliest king of the Tripuri Kalachuri dynasty. The Sagar inscription gives him the imperial titles Parama-bhattaraka Maharājadhirāja Parameshvara, and states that the issuer king meditated on his feet. Generally, Indian inscriptions use the phrase "meditating on his feet" to denote the relationship between a king and his predecessor. However, several later Kalachuri inscriptions also describe the issuer kings as meditating on the feet of "Vāma-deva"; these include the inscriptions issued by Karna, Yashahkarna, Narasimha, Jayasimha and Vijayasimha. Some scholars, such as D. C. Sircar and V. S. Pathak, have also disputed Vāma-rāja's identification as a king, identifying him as a religious preceptor of Kalachuri kings instead. For example, Sircar notes that according to Prithviraja Vijaya, a Kalachuri king named Sahasika offered his kingdom as guru-dakshina to the ascetic Vāma-deva, which may explain why inscriptions use imperial titles for him. Epigraphist V. V. Mirashi has proved such theories as untenable. Mirashi argues that the reason so many Kalachuri kings are said to have "meditated on his feet" is because he was the founder of the Tripuri Kalachuri kingdom.

The reading of the king's name in the Sagar inscription is not clear. Mirashi reads it as Vāma-rāja-deva, identifying him with Vāma-deva mentioned in other Kalachuri records. Archaeologist Rai Bahadur Hiralal, the earliest scholar to refer to the inscription, read the name as "Vagha-rāja". Alternative readings include "Vava-rāja-deva" (D. C. Sircar), "Vapa-rāja-deva" or "Va(ve)pa-rāja-deva" (L. N. Rao), and "Vapa-rāja-deva" (A. M. Shastri).

Mirashi dates Vāmarāja to the 7th century, and theorizes that he originally ruled from Kalanjara. The Kahla inscription mentions that an unnamed Kalachuri prince established himself at Kalanjara, and conquered Ayomukha (modern Raebareli-Pratapgarh area); he gave the northern part of his territory to his younger brother Lakshamana-rāja, who established the Sarayupara branch of the Kalachuris. Mirashi theorizes that the unnamed elder brother was Vāma-rāja. Several Kalachuri inscriptions describe Vamadeva as devotee of Shiva (parama-māheśvara).

The next king of the Tripuri Kalachuri dynasty known from the inscriptions was Shankaragana I. R. K. Sharma speculates that two generations may have separated Vāmarāja and Shankaragana I, and Mayurāja and Bhimata may have been the predecessors of Shankaragana I. The 10th century poet Rājashekhara mentions Mayurāja, the author of the Sanskrit play Udattaraghava, as a Kalachuri poet; he also mentions Bhimata as the lord of Kalanjara.
