= Kalachuris of Sarayupara =

Branch of the Kalachuris in Sarayupura (650 - 1080 CE)

The Kalachuris of Sarayupara (c.650 - c.1080) were a medieval Indian dynasty who ruled along the banks of the Sarayu (modern Ghaghara) river in present-day Eastern Uttar Pradesh. Their domain consisted of the present-day Bahraich, Champaran, and Gonda districts.

== History ==
There have been multiple dynasties with the name kalachuri. One such branch of the Kalachuris started ruling on the banks of the Sarayu (modern Ghaghara) river from the Seventh-century CE.

Lakshmanaraja II is the first known king of the dynasty, who defended his kingdom from an attack by the powerful Pala ruler Dharmapala. The third king of the dynasty, Shankargana I, was defeated by the Kalachuri king of Tripuri, Kokalla I. Shankargana I's successor, Gunambodhideva, successfully assisted the Gurjara-Pratihara ruler Mihira Bhoja in his war against the Pala ruler Devapala. Mihira Bhoja granted some territories to Gunambodhideva in exchange for his assistance.

The sixth king, Bhamanadeva, helped the Gurjara-Pratihara ruler Mahipala I in seizing the Malwa region from the Paramara ruler Vairisimha II, who was a vassal of the Rashtrakuta empire at the time. The thirteenth ruler, Bhima, lost his kingdom due to a civil war. In 1031 CE, Vyasa, a son of a previous ruler Gunasagara II, was made the king of Sarayupara. The kingdom reached its peak under Sondhadeva, the last known ruler of the dynasty, who was ruling in 1079 CE and took the title of Maharajadhiraja. His kingdom extended from the Ghaghara river to the Gandak river and comprised the present-day districts of Bahraich, Gonda, Basti and Gorakphur. The fate of Sondha Deva and his powerful kingdom is unknown.

== List of rulers ==
- Lakshmanaraja II c. late 8th Century
- Shivaraja I
- Shankaragana c. 845 - 885
- Gunambodhideva / Gunasagara I c. 875
- Ullabha
- Bhamanadeva
- Shankaragana II
- Mugdhatunga
- Gunasagara II
- Shivraja II
- Bhamana
- Shankaragana III
- Bhima c. 1010s
- Vyasa
- Sondha Deva (1079)
