= Kokalla I =

Kalachuri king
- Reign: 850-890 CE
- Predecessor: Lakshmana-raja I (825-850 CE)
- Successor: Shankaragana II (890-910 CE)
- Spouse: Natta-devi
- Issue: Shankaragana II, Arjuna, Valleka, Mahadevi, unnamed son (founder of the Ratnapura branch of Kalachuris)
- Dynasty: Kalachuris of Tripuri

Kokalla I (r.c. 850-890 CE) was a king from the Kalachuri dynasty of Tripuri in central India. His kingdom was centered around the Chedi or Dahala region in present-day Madhya Pradesh. He appears to have used military and matrimonial alliances with his powerful neighbours - the Rashtrakutas and the Pratiharas - to expand his kingdom, while nominally accepting their suzerainty. The later Kalachuri inscriptions present him as a powerful and prestigious king.

== Background ==
No inscription issued during the reign of Kokalla has been found, but several other inscriptions of the dynasty refer to him, suggesting that he enjoyed considerable power and prestige. These inscriptions mention his name variously as Kokalla-raja, Kokalla-deva, Kokkala, and Kokkalla.

According to the Gyaraspur inscription of his son Valleka, Kokalla was the son of Voppa-raja (or Boppa-raja). The other extant Kalachuri inscriptions do not name Kokalla's father or predecessor, and simply describe him as a descendent of the legendary king Kartavirya Arjuna. Historian V. V. Mirashi, who did not have access to the Gyaraspur inscription, theorized that Kokalla may have been a son of Lakshmana-raja I. According to scholar Richard G. Salomon, Lakshmana-raja may have been another name of Voppa-raja, or Lakshmana-raja may have been the father of Voppa-raja.

Mirashi estimates Kokalla's reign as 850-890 CE. Historian D. C. Ganguly dates his ascension to c. 845 CE, stating that he was born in or before 817 CE, likely much earlier than 817 CE. (Note: The Khambhat (Cambay) inscription of the Rashtrakuta king Govinda IV attests that Kokalla's great-grand-daughter Vijamba was his mother. Ganguly places Govinda IV's ascension to 918 CE. Based on this date and other assumptions, such as Vijamba being at least 14 years old at the time of birth of Govinda IV's elder brother Amoghavarsha II, Ganguly suggests that Kokalla must have been born in or before 817 CE.)

== Reign ==
=== Relations with the Pratiharas and the Rashtrakutas ===
The Kalachuri kingdom neighboured two dominant powers of India: the Pratiharas in the north, and the Rashtrakutas in the south. The Kalachuris were feudatories to these two powers at different times. During the time of Lakshmana-raja I (r. c. 825-850 CE), the Kalachuris were feudatories to Rashtrakutas, as attested by the Karitalai inscription. By the time of Kokalla, they appear to have become feudatories to the Pratiharas. It is possible that Kokalla opportunistically played his powerful neighbours against each other, and used strategic alliances with them to expand his own kingdom while nominally accepting their suzerainty.

The Gyaraspur inscription of Kokalla's son Valleka suggests that the Pratihara king Bhoja I was the overlord of Valleka, and presumably, of Kokalla. (Note: Some earlier historians theorized that Kokalla was a contemporary of the Pratihara king Bhoja II, but this theory is now discredited as Kokalla's reign ended around 890 CE, several years before Bhoja II ascended the throne.) The inscription states that Valleka conquered various parts of India and put them "in the power of" Bhoja, made donations with Bhoja's consent, and served Bhoja. It boasts that Valleka conquered the kings of Odra, Dramida, Andhra, and Pandya; the Karnatas; the soldiers of Lata; the Konkanas; the Kashmiras; and the cruel lords of Anga and Vanga: he placed them all the power of Bhoja.

The later Kalachuri inscriptions glorify Kokalla, and do not mention that the Kalachuris accepted Bhoja's suzerainty. For example, the Bilhari inscription states that Kokalla "conquered the whole earth" and set up two victory pillars: Krishna-raja in the south, and Bhoja-deva in the north. This seems to be a boastful way of describing Kokalla's support to his powerful neighbours - the Rashtrakuta king Krishna II and the Pratihara king Bhoja. The 1042 CE Varanasi inscription of Lakshmikarna states that Kokalla's hand gave these kings "freedom from fear". Based on such descriptions, some earlier historians such as R. C. Majumdar speculated that Kokalla defeated Bhoja. However, it is now accepted that the later Kalachuri inscriptions exaggerate Kokalla's status. Kokalla appears to have expanded the Pratihara empire in the south-east as a military agent of Bhoja, laying the foundation of the Kalachuri empire in the process. Historian D. C. Ganguly theorizes that Kokalla assisted Bhoja against the Palas of Bengal.

As for the Rashtrakutas, it is possible that Kokalla sent the crown prince Shankaragana II to assist him against the eastern Chalukya king Vijayaditya III.

=== Other military activities ===
Besides Bhoja and Krishna, the Varanasi inscription also credits Kokalla with giving "freedom from fear" to Shri-harsha and Shankaragana. Shri-harsha, described as the lord of Chitrakuta, has been identified as a Guhila prince of Chittor. Shankaragana has been identified as the father of Gunambodhi-deva, a ruler of the subordinate Kalachuri branch of present-day Gorakhpur area.

An inscription of the Ratnapura Kalachuri king Prithvi-deva I credits Kokalla with subjugating the rulers of Karnata, Vanga, Gurjara, Konkana, and Shakambhari; the Turushkas; and a descendant of Raghu. This claim is unreliable, as the inscription was issued nearly two centuries after Kokalla's death.

=== Matrimonial alliances ===
Kokalla appears to have used matrimonial alliances to strengthen his position. He married the Chandela princess Natta-devi (IAST: Naṭṭā-devi) (Note: The 1042 CE Varanasi inscription of Lakshmikarna calls Kokalla's queen "Natta".) or Nata (Note: The Gyaraspur inscription of Valleka calls Kokalla's queen "Nata", and describes her as the daughter of the ruler of Malwa.) She was probably a daughter of the Chandela king Jayashakti or his successor Rahila.

Kokalla's daughter Maha-devi became the chief queen of the Rashtrakuta king Krishna II.

Kokalla may have also established a matrimonial alliance with the Pala dynasty of Bengal. Lajja-devi, a wife of the Pala emperor Vigrahapala I, came from the Haihaya family. Since the Kalachuris alternatively called themselves Haihayas, scholar O. P. Verma theorizes that she may have been a daughter of the contemporary Kalachuri king Kokalla.

== Succession ==
Kokalla was succeeded by his son Shankaragana II, whose titles included Prasiddha-dhavala, Mugdha-tunga, and Rana-vigraha. Accordng to the Maliyapundi inscription of the eastern Chalukya king Amma II, his ancestor Vijayaditya III defeated Sankila, whom modern historians identify as Kokalla's son Shankaragana. Thus, Shankaragana must have succeeded his father sometime before Vijayaditya III's reign ended in 892 CE.

Several inscriptions of the Ratnapura Kalachuris state that Kokalla had 18 sons, the eldest of whom (presumably Shankaragana II) succeeded him on the throne of Tripuri. The new king made his brothers as governors of various territories (mandalas): one of these was the progenitor of the Ratnapura branch of the dynasty. According to scholar Richard G. Salomon, the number 18 was traditionally considered auspicious, and probably should not be taken literally – it may simply mean that Kokalla had many sons.

Kokalla and Natta had another son, called Valleka alias Vallavati (or Ballavati). He is known from his Gyaraspur stone inscription, which records the foundation of a Jaina temple.

Arjuna, another son of Kokalla, is known from the Rashtrakuta inscriptions.
