= Shankaragana II =

Shankara-gana II

Kalachuri king
- Reign: 890-910 CE
- Predecessor: Kokalla I
- Successor: Bala-harsha
- Issue: Bala-harsha, Yuva-raja-deva I, Lakshmi, Govindamba
- Dynasty: Kalachuris of Tripuri
- Mother: Natta-devi

Shankara-gana II (IAST: Śaṅkaragaṇa, r. c. 890–910) was a king of the Kalachuri dynasty of Tripuri in central India. He conquered Pali from the ruler of Dakshina Kosala. His daughters Lakshmi and Govindamba were the mothers of the Rashtrakuta kings Indra III and Amogha-varsha III, respectively.

== Reign ==
Shankara-gana II was a son of his predecessor Kokalla I and queen Natta-devi, who came from a Chandela family. He ascended the throne in c. 890 CE. (Note: The eastern Chalukya king Vijayaditya III defeated one Sankila, whom modern historians identify as Shankaragana. Since Vijayaditya's reign ended in 892 CE, Shankara-gana must have ascended the throne sometime before this year. However, it is also possible that Shankaragana fought against Vijayaditya as a prince.) Prasiddha-dhavala, Mugdha-tunga, and Rana-vigraha were his epithets (birudas).

- The title Mugdha-tunga appears in the Bilhari inscription of Yuva-raja-deva II, which describes him as Kokalla's son and the heir apparent.
- Prasiddha-dhavala appears as the name or title of Kokalla and Natta's son in the Varanasi inscription of Lakshmikarna.
- The title Rana-vigraha is known from the Rashtrakuta records and also from a poem of Raja-shekhara cited in the Suktimuktavali.

The inscriptions of his successors (Note: These inscriptions include the Bilhari stone inscription of Yuva-raja-deva II and the Varanasi inscription of Karna.) state that he conquered Pali from the lord of (Dakshina) Kosala. The contemporary king of Kosala was likely the Bana king Vikramaditya I Jaya-meru.

According to the Bilhari inscription, Shankara-gana II conquered multiple countries along the coast of the eastern ocean. Based on this description, historian H. C. Ray speculates that after his conquest of Pali, Shankara-gana II may have marched along the Mahanadi River to reach the Bay of Bengal. According to the Maliyapundi inscription of the eastern Chalukya king Amma II, his ancestor Vijayaditya III defeated Sankila, whom modern historians identify as Shankara-gana I. Possibly, when Shankara-gana II was still a prince, his father Kokalla may have sent him against the Chalukyas in support of his Rashtrakuta overlord.

Shankara-gana's son Bala-harsha succeeded him in c. 910 CE, followed by his other son Yuva-raja-deva I. His daughters Lakshmi and Govindamba both married the Rashtrakuta prince Jagattunga, and were the mothers of the Rashtrakuta kings Indra III and Amogha-varsha III, respectively.
