= Kirttivarman =

Kirttivarman (also Kirtivarman or Kirtivarma) may refer to:

- Kirttivarman I, 6th century Chalukya ruler of south-western India
- Kirtivarman II, 8th century Chalukya ruler of south-western India
- Kirttivarman (Chandela dynasty), 11th century ruler of central India
