= Napoleon of India =

Napoleon of India can refer to the following individuals:

- Samudra Gupta (335–375)
- Rajendra I (1014–1044) "Napoleon of South India" (and South East Asia)
- Gangeyadeva (1010–1041) "Napoleon of West India"
- Hemu (1501–1556) "Napoleon of Medieval India"
- Shivaji (1640-1680)
- Yashwantrao Holkar (1776–1811)
- Maharaja Ranjeet Singh (1799–1839)
- General Zorawar Singh (1786–1841) "Little Napoleon of India"
- Chilarai (1510–1571)
