= Vijayaditya III =

Eastern Chalukya emperor from 848 to 892

- Gunaga; Gunage-Nallata; Parachakra Rama; Vallabha
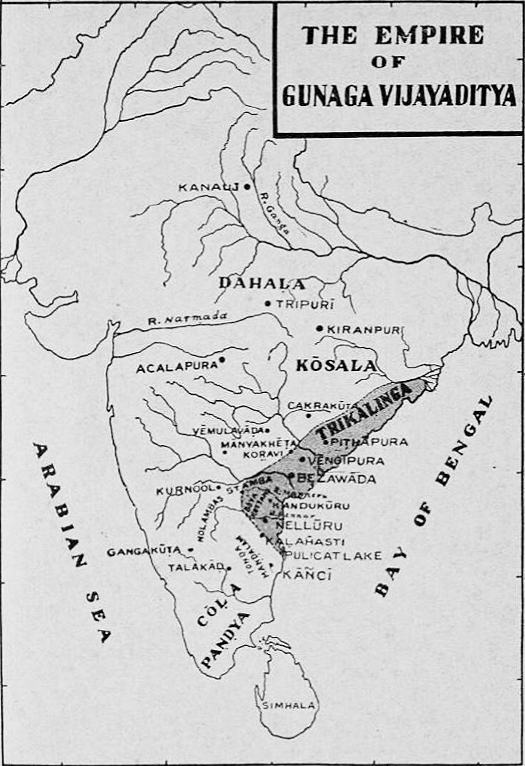
- Map of India c. 753 CE. The Eastern Chalukya kingdom is shown on the eastern coast.

Eastern Chalukya Emperor
- Reign: 848–892
- Predecessor: Kali Vishnuvardhana V (847– 848 AD)
- Successor: Bhima I Dronarjuna (892 – 921 AD)
- Dynasty: Eastern Chalukyas
- Father: Kali Vishnuvardhana V
- Mother: Silamahadevi (granddaughter of Dhruva Dharavarsha)
- Religion: Hinduism

Gunaga Vijayaditya III (reigned 848–892) was the most powerful king of the Vengi kingdom. His military victories brought a large portion of the Deccan Plateau under his control. He was a valuable ally of the Rashtrakuta emperor Amoghavarsha I, and after Amoghavarsha's death, he proclaimed independence. He took several titles like Gunaga, Gunage-Nallata, Parachakra Rama, Vallabha, etc.

== Reign ==
His reign began with an expedition under his talented general Pandaranga to crush the Boya-Kottamas, a sturdy race of warriors who inhabited the northern borders of the Pallava kingdom (present-day Nellore district). His army captured the rebel strongholds of Kottama and Nellore. General Pandaranga was made governor of the annexed territory with his headquarters at Kandukur. They also captured the territory of a chief named Rahana.

Gunaga Vijayaditya III, unlike his predecessors, maintained friendly relations with the Rashtrakuta emperor Amoghavarsha I and was sent to Gangavadi to crush the rebellion of the Western Gangas and other rebellious vassals. Vijayaditya bided his time until Amoghavarsha's death, and established independence. He defeated and pursued Krishna II, the successor of Amoghavarsha, till Chedi in central India.

Accordng to the Maliyapundi inscription of his descendant Amma II, Vijayaditya III defeated Sankila, whom modern historians identify as the Kalachuri king Shankara-gana II. It is possible that Shankara-gana's father Kokalla I sent him against the Chalukyas in support of his Rashtrakuta overlord.

Vijayaditya III patronised Jainism, which was popular among the masses.
