= Yuvarajadeva II =

Ruler of the Kalachuri dynasty of Tripuri in central India

King of Dahala
- Reign: c. 980-990 CE
- Predecessor: Shankaragana III
- Successor: Kokalla II
- Issue: Kokalla II
- Dynasty: Kalachuris of Tripuri

Yuvarajadeva II (IAST: Yuva-rāja-deva, r. c. 980-990 CE) was a ruler of the Kalachuri dynasty of Tripuri in central India. His kingdom was centered around the Chedi or Dahala region in present-day Madhya Pradesh. He established matrimonial relations with the Chalukyas of Kalyani, and was defeated by their rival, the Paramara king Munja.

== Early life ==
Yuvarajadeva succeeded his elder brother Shankaragana III, who was probably killed in a battle against the Chandelas.

== Reign ==
The Karanbel inscription of Yuvarajadeva's descendant claims that he raided several countries, and presented the plundered wealth to lord Somnath. His ancestor Lakshmanaraja II is also credited with a similar achievement. According to historian V. V. Mirashi, these are conventional praises, and should not be taken as factual descriptions. The Karanbel inscription also boasts that Yuvarajadeva once fought and killed a tiger.

Yuvarajadeva's sister Bonthadevi married the Kalyani Chalukya ruler Tailapa II, apparently as part of a matrimonial alliance. The Paramara king Munja, who was an enemy of Tailapa, invaded the Kalachuri kingdom and raided their capital Tripuri. The Udaipur prashasti inscription of the Paramaras suggests that Munja defeated Yuvarajadeva, killed the Kalachuri generals, and "held his sword high" in Tripuri. Munja was later defeated and captured by Tailapa: the later Chalukya inscriptions also mention him as "destroyer of the Chedi king" while describing Tailapa's victory.

According to V. V. Mirashi, Yuvarajadeva was probably killed while defending Tripuri against Munja, and Munja was later forced to retreat by Tailapa. After his death, the ministers of the state placed his son Kokalla II on the throne of Tripuri.
