= Kokalla II =

Ruler of Tripuri (c. 990–1015)

King of Dahala
- Reign: c. 990–1015 CE
- Predecessor: Yuvarajadeva II
- Successor: Gangeyadeva
- Issue: Gangeyadeva
- Dynasty: Kalachuris of Tripuri
- Father: Yuvarajadeva II

Kokalla II (IAST: , r. c. 990–1015 CE) was a ruler of the Kalachuri dynasty of Tripuri in central India. His kingdom was centered around the Chedi or Dahala region in present-day Madhya Pradesh. His Gurgi inscription suggests that he raided the territories of the Gurjara-Pratiharas, the Palas and the Chalukyas of Kalyani.

== Early life ==
Kokalla was a son of the Kalachuri king Yuvarajadeva II. He was placed on the throne by the ministers of the state after his father's death.

== Reign ==
The Gurgi inscription of Kokalla boasts that the other kings were afraid of him: the Gurjara king hid in the Himalayas, the Gauda king hid in the watery fort, and the Kuntala king lived in forest. These claims indicate that Kokalla probably raided these territories:

- The Gurjara king was probably a Chaulukya king, either Mularaja or Chamundaraja. However, as the Kalachuri inscription suggests that the Himalayan region was part of his kingdom, he can also be identified with a weak Gurjara-Pratihara ruler, probably Rajyapala.
- The Gauda king can be identified with the Pala ruler Mahipala.
- The Kuntala king can be identified with the Kalayani Chalukya king Vikramaditya V. Kokalla's paternal aunt had married the Chalukya king Tailapa II. It is possible that the Chalukya-Kalachuri relations deteriorated after Tailapa's death.

The Jabalpur and Khaira inscriptions of Kokalla's descendant Yashahkarna boast that Kokalla raided countries in four directions until he reached the four oceans. This seems to be mere conventional praise. When the Turkic ruler Mahmud of Ghazni invaded India in 1015, he was opposed near the pilgrim city of Mathura by Kokalla II, whose army consisted of a large number of war elephants. The battle was hotly contested, but Kokalla II was eventually defeated due to the mobility and speed of the Turkic cavalry. Mahmud then proceeded to plunder Mathura and the nearby city of Vrindavan. 50,000 Hindus were killed by drowning or by using swords and 1,000 temples were demolished in the district.

The Udaipur Prashasti inscription of the Paramaras claims that their king Bhoja defeated one Togglala. S. K. Bose identifies Togglala with Kokalla II. Kokalla was succeeded by his son Gangeyadeva, who appears to have served as Bhoja's vassal during the first few years of his reign.
