= Subhash Kapoor (art dealer) =

Indian American art smuggler

- Years active: 1974–2011
- Status: Convicted in India
- Criminal charges: art theft, grand larceny, criminal possession of stolen property
- Penalty: 7 year prison term for conspiracy, and an additional 3 years for dealing in stolen objects

Subhash Kapoor is an India-born American art smuggler who was convicted for running a $100 million international smuggling racket. He was previously the owner of the Art of the Past gallery in Manhattan. His sister business, Nimbus Import/Exports, specialised in selling antiquities from across the Indian subcontinent and Southeast Asia to major museums around the world.

== Early life and career ==
Subhash Kapoor was born in 1949. Shortly before the partition of British India in 1947, his father Parshotam Ram Kapoor had migrated from Lahore in present-day Pakistan to Jalandhar in present-day India. The family occupied the home of a Muslim scholar in Jalandhar, who had migrated to Pakistan. Parshotam realized that the historical books and manuscripts left behind by the scholar were valuable antiques, and established a business to trade them. By 1962, the family moved to Delhi, where Parshotam opened an art gallery in South Extension, specializing in Pahari paintings. Subhash and his brother Ramesh partiicpated in the business. Parshotam allegedly trafficked antiques sourced from temple thieves in India, Pakistan and Afghanistan.

In 1974, Subhash Kapoor migrated to the United States, and established the Temple Arts gallery, near the Museum Mile in the New York City. In 1975, his brother Ramesh also emigrated to the US, and established Kapoor Galleries nearby. He maried Neeru in 1976, in India, and the couple had a daughter Mamta shortly after. In the 1980s, Subhash Kapoor renamed his gallery to "Art of the Past". He obtained US citizenship, and became known for rare Indian art: he attended major art openings in New York and other places, frequently appeared in Arts of Asia magazine, and donated artwork to the Smithsonian Institution. Kapoor's company Nimbus Import/Exports sold antiques from South and Southeast Asia to major museums and art galleries, including the Metropolitan Museum of Art in New York City, the J. Paul Getty Museum in Los Angeles, the Royal Ontario Museum in Toronto, and the National Gallery of Australia in Canberra.

Kapoor's wife Neeru Kapoor divorced him in 1986. The same year is believed to have marked the beginning of the international network of art restorers, dealers and suppliers that orchestrated temple thefts and smuggling of antiques. According to investigators, since 1992, Kapoor's girlfriend Selina Mohamed participated in fabricating ownership histories for artifacts that Kapoor sold to museums. In 1997, Kapoor started dating the Singapore-based art dealer Grace Paramaspry Punusamy, who sold his artefacts on consignment.

In the 2000s, Kapoor was involved in smuggling of several antiques from the ancient temples of Tamil Nadu, India. Indian authorities allege that he would identify the idols to be stolen, and his Chennai-based accomplice Sanjeevi Asokan would use a network of temple thieves to steal them. Asokan would ship the idols to Law Shang, the owner of a Hong Kong based shipping company, using fake authenticity certificates or false shipping mainfests. Shang exported them to the London-based art restorer Neil Perry-Smith, who sent them to Kapoor's Nimbus warehouses in New York. Kapoor would falsify the provenance of the antiques, and sell them to galleries or private collectors. Sometimes, Kapoor's accomplices would ship the stolen idol with copies and handicrafts to mislead the customs officials. Kapoor would create false provenance and ownership histories for the idols to mislead the prospective buyers such as museum officials.

Kapoor and his accomplices based in Tamil Nadu are known to have smuggled several antiques from India to foreign countries. He sold, and sometimes gifted, these figures to several museums and collections. Some of these antiques include the Sripuranthan Natarajan Idol, which was later returned to India by the Australian National Gallery; and the Nagapattinam Buddha statue, which was later recovered by the Homeland Security Investigations (HSI) of the US. After his father's death in 2007, Kapoor donated an artwork collection to the Metropolitan Museum of Art.

As of 2025, the Indian authorities have focused only on Kapoor's activities in Tamil Nadu. However, there is evidence that his network was also active in Madhya Pradesh. The HSI recovered a 6'6" female figure from Kapoor's Art of the Past antique shop in New York. Kapoor had declared that the figure had been found in Khartoum, and that it had been imported into the US in 1954, before the Archaeological Resources Protection Act of 1979. After The HSI sent photographs of the figure to archaeologist Kirit L. Mankodi, who identified it as the figure of the goddess Mahākokā from Bharhut, documented by Alexander Cunningham in 1873 and reported stolen in 2004. Mankodi also suspects that Kapoor was connected to the thefts reported at Bilhari and Karitalai in 2006; at least two of the stolen images were recovered by the HSI.

Since 2007, Kapoor's girlfriend Selina Mohamed nominally controlled several of his storage facilities. At one such facility in Manhattan, the US authorities later seized an estimated $20 million worth of stolen artwork in 2012, including antiques from Tamil Nadu.

In 2008, Kapoor ended his relationship with Punusamy. A few months later, in April 2009, Punusamy posted messages on the Brooklyn Museum's website, questioning the provenance of some of the artefacts acquired by the museum. The messages came to the attention of the HSI officer Brenton Easter, whose team started building a case against Kapoor.

By 2010, Kapoor was being investigated by the India's Central Bureau of Investigation (CBI), the US HSI, and the Interpol. That year, he sued Punusamy in Singapore, claiming that she owed him 15 expensive artefacts and $15,000. She sued him back, claiming that he owed her 20 artefacts. The judge dismissed the affair as a quarrel between ex-lovers, and ordered Punusamy to pay for the cost of the trial.

In 2010, Australia-based American archaeologist Damien Huffer blogged about Kapoor's alleged involvement in smuggling artifacts, but took down the blog posts after Kapoor threatened to sue him. In February 2011, Kapoor blamed Punusamy of spreading lies against him, and maintained his innocence. Punusamy helped the authorities track him, leading to his arrest at Frankfurt in 2011.

== Arrest and imprisonment ==
In early October 2011, India's CBI issued an international alert, known as an Interpol's Red List Notice, for Kapoor's "non bailable" warrant for arrest in connection with a theft case at the temple in Sripuranthan village, in the Ariyalur district of Tamil Nadu. On 30 October 2011, Kapoor was arrested at Frankfurt International Airport, and on 14 July 2012, extradited to Chennai, India on charges of receiving artifacts that had been stolen from disused temples in southern India. Many of these objects were purchased by museums throughout the world. For example, in 2008 an 11th-century Chola-period bronze statue of a Dancing Shiva was sold by Kapoor to the National Gallery of Australia for $5.6 million (see Sripuranthan Natarajan Idol). The statue was allegedly stolen from an Indian temple in Tamil Nadu.

Kapoor was handed over to India by German authorities and extradited in July 2012 and was held in custody in Chennai. He was later transferred to Vellore Central Prison in the South Indian state of Tamil Nadu and still later to the high security block of Tiruchirapalli Central Prison while awaiting trial for the theft of idols from Varadaraja Perumal temple in the state's Ariyalur district in Tamil Nadu. He was attacked by a fellow inmate Kongu Yuvaraj, who was accused of committing an honor killing, following a heated argument between these two.

Kapoor had a safe house in Manhattan, where several several stolen idols were stored. After Kapoor's arrest in 2011, his sister Sushma Sareen and daughter Mamta Sager, with help from the gallery employee Aaron M Freedman, moved these idols to Sareen's house in Long Island. It is estimated that Kapoor and his accomplices used the Art of the Past gallery to trade over 2,600 trafficked objects valued at nearly $143 million.

Kapoor is a diabetic, and was diagnosed with prostate cancer at the Puzhal Central Prison in Chennai.

== Concluded and pending court cases ==
In 2012 the Manhattan District Attorney's Office issued an arrest warrant for Subhash Kapoor. By November 2019 that office had indicted Kapoor for a total of 86 Counts in the New York, including Grand Larceny in the First Degree (1 Count), Criminal Possession of Stolen Property in the First Degree (16 Counts), Grand Larceny in the Second Degree (13 Counts), Criminal Possession of Stolen Property in the Second Degree (50 Counts), Grand Larceny in the Third Degree (1 Count) Criminal Possession of Stolen Property in the Third Degree (3 Counts), Conspiracy in the Fourth Degree (1 Count) and one Count of Scheme and Defraud in the First Degree. All of the charges were based upon evidence gathered by the New York public prosecutor's office investigation, assisted by the HSI, into the illegal importation and sale of stolen antiquities and other art objects and for having provided said items with fraudulent provenance documents of prior ownership.

In 2015, the Manhattan District Attorney's Office brought a civil forfeiture action against Kapoor over an enormous collection of allegedly looted antiquities, and in July 2020 submitted extradition paperwork while he imprisoned in India pending the completion of his ongoing trial in Tamil Nadu.

In November 2022 Kapoor was found guilty in India under the following charges related to the case involving the theft of idols:

- IPC penal code section 411 (dishonestly receiving stolen property) carrying with it a three year prison sentence plus a fine.
- IPC penal code section 413 (receives or deals in property which he knows or has reason to believe to be stolen property) carrying with it a three year prison sentence plus a fine.
- IPC penal code section 120 b (criminal conspiracy) carrying with it a seven year prison sentence plus a fine.

He was sentenced by Chief Judicial Magistrate D Shanmuga Priya, to a seven-year prison term for conspiracy with an additional three years for buying and dealing in stolen goods. Despite having already served the entirety of that sentence while his case progressed through the court in India. Kapoor remains in custody due to an extradition hold related to a request by the Manhattan District Attorney's Office.

In July 2023, Kapoor was required to serve an additional three months in prison for non-payment of a court-imposed fine of Rs 7,000. Sources in the Tamil Nadu Police speculated to the ThePrint, an Indian news website, that the non-payment of the fine may have been a deliberate ploy to delay his extradition to the US. As of July 2023, Kapoor remains in prison in Tamil Nadu, awaiting trial in three additional idol theft cases. According to Advocate Senthil Vadivelu, the Tamil Nadu government has requested the continuation of these cases, but progress is stalled due to the New York City government's reluctance to proceed, as Kapoor is also wanted in the US.

== Recovery of smuggled items ==
On November 10, 2022 the Manhattan District Attorney, Alvin L. Bragg, Jr., announced the return of 187 antiquities collectively valued at nearly $3.4 million to the people of Pakistan all of which had been seized pursuant to the Office's investigation into Subhas Kapoor's smuggling operation.

In 2022, the US returned 307 recovered antiquities to India, worth more $4 million, three quarters of which were linked to Kapoor.

In April 2022, the Yale University Art Gallery surrendered items valued at more than $1 million as part of art looting investigation. The 13 South Asian artifacts returned by the museum were smuggled by Kapoor.

On 30 March 2023 the Metropolitan Museum of Art, New York, announced that it had relinquished 15 antique sculptures to the Government of India after being informed that they were "illegally removed" from India. All the sculptures had been sold at one point by Subhash Kapoor.

In April 2024, the US returned stolen antiquities linked to Kapoor to Cambodia and Indonesia. The stolen antiquities that were returned, including a bronze Shiva triad, were valued at $3 million.

== See also ==
- Sripuranthan Natarajan Idol
