= Shankaragana I =

Shankara-gana I (IAST: Śaṅkaragaṇa, r.c. 750-775 CE) was a king of the Kalachuri dynasty of Tripuri in central India. Three inscriptions during his reign have been found in Madhya Pradesh.

== Ancestry ==
Shankaragana is known from three inscriptions, which can be dated to 8th century on palaeographic basis. His reign can be dated to c. 750-775 CE.

The Sagar inscription describes Shankaragana as meditating on the feet of Vama-raja-deva. Both the kings are given the imperial titles Parama-bhattaraka, Maharajdhiraja, and Parameshvara. Generally, contemporary inscriptions mention a king as meditating at the feet of his predecessor, but inscriptions of several later Kalachuri kings also describe them as meditating at the feet of Vama-deva. It is possible that Vama-raja-deva alias Vama-deva established the founder of the Kalachuri branch of Tripuri. Mirashi speculates that two generations may have separated Vāmarāja and Shankaragana I, and Mayurāja and Bhimata may have been the predecessors of Shankaragana I. The 10th century poet Raja-shekhara describes Mayurāja, the author of the Sanskrit play Udattaraghava, as the best Kalachuri poet. Raja-shekhara also mentions Bhimata as the lord of Kalanjara and author of five plays.

== Reign ==
Shankaragana's imperial titles suggest that he ruled over a large territory. Historian Amrendra Kumar Singh theorizes that he possibly commissioned the temples in the Bandhavgarh Fort and Bhedaghat areas.

=== Inscriptions ===
The Sagar stone inscription, issued during Shankaragana's reign, is inscribed on a red sandstone slab. It is undated, but may be assigned to the 8th century on palaeographic basis. It is one of the several inscriptions brought to a military compound in Sagar from neighbouring areas. The inscription features Sanskrit language in proto-Nagari script. It begins with an invocation to Shiva, and records meritorious work done by a woman named Krishna-devi of the Loniya family, for the religious merit of her parents. Krishna-devi describes herself as the wife of prince Deuka, who was a son of the emperor of Kasha-pura. The emperor is said to have been born in the family of Kalaireya: his name is not clear, but historian V. V. Mirashi doubtfully read it as Ravarya. The panel below the inscription depicts Krishna-devi as a small figure between her parents. The father's hands are folded in salutation, and the mother's right hand is placed on the head of Krishna-devi. Behind the father, there is a horse and another man (probably a groom) holding its reins.

The Chhoti Deori inscription was found at a Shiva temple pillar in Chhoti Deori alias Madha Deori village near Murwara. It contains 11 lines written in "very incorrect" Sanskrit language (possibly influenced by the local dialec) and proto-Nagari script. It can be dated between the 7th century and the mid-8th century on palaeographic basis. The inscription contains prose except an introductory verse in praise of Shiva. It states that Chutu Nagaka was in charge of the Kakandakutu vishaya (district) during the reign of Shankaragana. The rest of the text is not clear, but it appears to record Chutu Nagaka's donation of a granary in two villages named Karikatin and Asekatin.

The Muria stone inscription was found at the Muria near Boria village on Sagar-Jabalpur road. It is inscribed on a pillar, and its script resembles that of the other inscriptions issued during Shankaragana's reign. It is fragmentary, and only parts of two lines now survive. It probably recorded the construction of a temple by Bhatti-kara-deva, possibly a subordinate of Shankaragana.

== Descendants ==
No information is available about Shankaragana's immediate successors. The next known kng of the dynasty is Lakshamana-rāja (r.c. 825-850 CE).
