= Vijayapala =

- Parama-bhattaraka Maharajadhiraja Parameshvara

Chandela king
- Reign: c. 1035-1050 CE
- Predecessor: Vidyadhara (Chandela ruler)
- Successor: Devavarman
- Spouse: Bhuvanadevi
- Dynasty: Chandela
- Father: Vidyadhara

Vijayapala (IAST: Vijayapāla; reigned c. 1035-1050 CE) was a king of the Chandela dynasty of India. He ruled in the Jejakabhukti region (Bundelkhand in present-day Madhya Pradesh and Uttar Pradesh).

Vijayapala was born to the Chandela ruler Vidyadhara. No inscription from his reign is available. He is mentioned in several Chandela inscriptions, but most of these contain only vague eulogies. For example, the Mau stone inscription declares that he killed all wicked men and put an end to the Kali Yuga.

By the end of Vidyadhara's reign, the Ghaznavid invasions had weakened the Chandela kingdom. Taking advantage of this, the Kalachuri king Gangeya-deva conquered eastern parts of their kingdom. A fragmentary Mahoba inscription claims that Vijayapala broke the pride of Gangeya in a battle.

The Kachchhapaghatas of Gwalior probably gave up their allegiance to the Chandelas during Vijayapala's reign. This is indicated by the use of high-sounding titles for the Kachchhapaghata ruler Muladeva in the Sas-Bahu inscription.

Vijayapala's sachiva (chief minister) was Mahipala, who was the son of Vidyadhara's chief minister Shivanga.

The decline of the Chandela kingdom started during Vijayapala's reign. His successor Devavarman was his son from the queen Bhuvanadevi. The Nanyaura copper-plate inscription of Devavarman is dated 1051 CE. This indicates that Vijayapala's reign ended sometime before this year. Devavarman's successor Kirttivarman was also a son of Vijayapala.
