= Shankaragana III =

Ruler of the Kalachuri dynasty of Tripuri in central India

King of Dahala
- Reign: c. 970-980 CE
- Predecessor: Lakshmanaraja
- Successor: Yuvarajadeva II
- Dynasty: Kalachuris of Tripuri

Shankaragana III (IAST: Śankaragaṇa, r. c. 970-980 CE) was a ruler of the Kalachuri dynasty of Tripuri in central India. His kingdom was centered around the Chedi or Dahala region in present-day Madhya Pradesh. He defeated a weak Gurjara-Pratihara ruler, and seems to have died in a battle against the Chandelas.

== Reign ==
Shankargana succeeded the Kalachuri king Lakshmanaraja II around 970 CE. Shankaragana adopted an aggressive policy against his neighbours. According to a Jabalpur inscription, he defeated the contemporary Gurjara-Pratihara king. This rival king was probably Vijayapala.

Shankaragana seems to have died in a battle against the Chandelas. A Bhilsa inscription boasts that the Chandela minister Vachaspati vanquished the king of Chedi (identified with Shankaragana) and his ally, a Shabara chief. Vachaspati was a subordinate of Krishnapa, the brother of the Chandela king Dhanga. A Maser inscription states that Narasimha of the Sulki family turned the wives of the Kalachuri king into widows. This seems to be a reference to Shankaragana's defeat in a battle against the Chandelas.

Shankaragana was succeeded by his younger brother Yuvarajadeva II.
