= Devavarman (Chandela dynasty) =

- Parama-bhattaraka Maharajadhiraja Parameshvara, Kalanjaradhipati

Chandela king
- Reign: c. 1050–1060 CE
- Predecessor: Vijayapala
- Successor: Kirttivarman
- Dynasty: Chandela
- Father: Vijayapala
- Mother: Bhuvanadevi

Devavarman (reigned c. 1050–1060 CE) was a king of the Chandela dynasty of India. He ruled the Jejakabhukti region (Bundelkhand in present-day Madhya Pradesh and Uttar Pradesh).

Devavarman was born to the Chandela ruler Vijayapala and his queen Bhuvanadevi. His titles included the usual Chandela titles such as Kalanjaradhipati ("Lord of Kalanjara") and Parama-bhattaraka Maharajadhiraja Parameshvara. He also called himself Parama-Maheshvara, which indicates that he was a Shaivite.

Devavarman is known only from the two inscriptions issued by him: the 1051 CE Nanyaura inscription, and the 1052 CE Charkhari inscription. According to these inscriptions, he succeeded Vijayapala. The other Chandela records omit his name, and mention his brother Kirttivarman as the next king after Vijayapala. Such omissions suggest the possibility of a dynastic conflict, but there is no definitive evidence on this matter.

Another possible reason for these omissions might have been the subjugation of the Chandelas by the Kalachuris of Tripuri during his reign. The allegorical play Prabodha-Chandrodaya, composed by Chandela court scholar Krishna Misra, suggests that the Kalachuri king de-throned the Chandela king. Another literary work — Vikramanka-Deva-Charita by Bilhana — states that the Kalachuri king Lakshmi-Karna was like the lord of death to the lord of Kalanjara. The later Chandela inscriptions credit Devavarman's successor Kirttivarman with resurrecting the Chandela power.
