= Kirttivarman (Chandela dynasty) =

- Parama-bhattaraka Maharajadhiraja Parameshvara, Kalanjaradhipati

Chandela king
- Reign: c. 1060–1100 CE
- Predecessor: Devavarman
- Successor: Sallakshanavarman
- Dynasty: Chandela
- Father: Vijayapala
- Mother: Bhuvanadevi

Kirttivarman (reigned c. 1060–1100 CE), also known as Kīrtivarman, was a king of the Chandela dynasty of India. He ruled the Jejakabhukti region (Bundelkhand in present-day Madhya Pradesh and Uttar Pradesh). He revived the Chandela power by defeating the Kalachuri king Lakshmi-Karna.

== Early life ==
Places where inscriptions of Kirttivarman have been discovered (map of Madhya Pradesh)

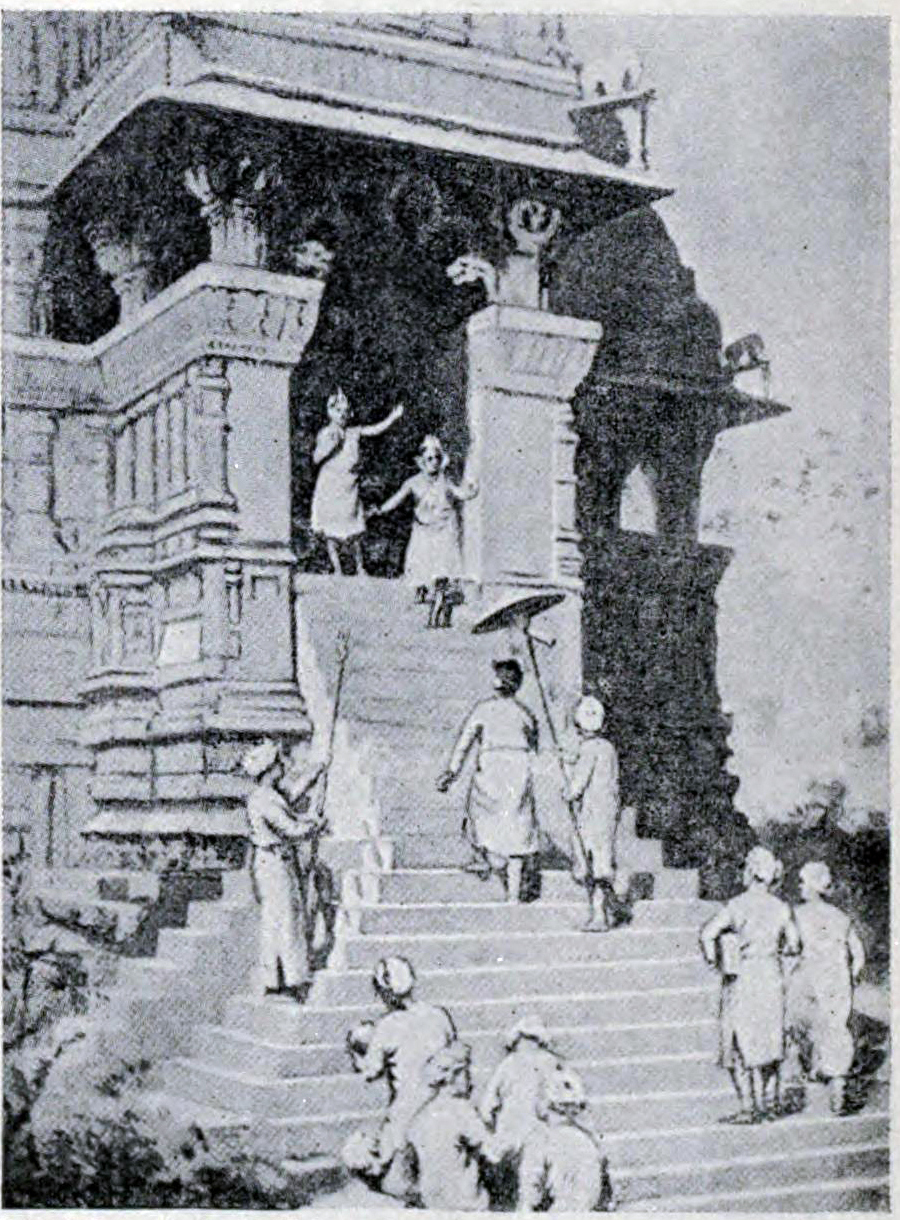
A 20th century artist's imagination of Kirtivarman Chandela visiting a Khajuraho temple

Kirttivarman was the son of the Chandela ruler Vijayapala. He was preceded by his elder brother Devavarman, who probably died without any heir. The extant inscriptions of Kirttivarman include the 1090 CE Kalinjar inscription and the 1098 CE Deogadh rock inscription.

== Battle victories ==
The Chandelas had been subjugated by the Kalachuri king Lakshmi-Karna during the reign of Devavarman. Kirttivarman revived the Chandela power by defeating Lakshmi-Karna. The Ajaygadh rock inscription of his descendant Viravarman states that he created a new kingdom by defeating Karna. A Mahoba inscription compares him to Purushottama (Vishnu), and states that crushed the haughty Lakshmi-Karna with his strong arms. Prabodha-Chandrodayam, a play written by Kirttivarman's contemporary Shri Krishna Mishra, states that a man named Shri Gopala defeated Lakshmi-Karna and caused the rise of Kirttivarman. Because this play was staged in Kirttivarman's court, it appears that Shri Gopala was held in high esteem by the king. Historians variously believe Gopala to be a feudatory, a general or a cousin of Kirttivarman. S. K. Mitra dates the battle to c. 1070 CE.

Chandela inscriptions also credit Kirttivarman with other victories, stating that he vanquished several enemies and that his commands "reached the borders of the sea".

The Muslim chronicle Diwan-i-Salman states that the Ghaznavid ruler Ibrahim (r. c. 1059-1099 CE) attacked the Chandela stronghold Kalanjara (modern Kalinjar). This suggests that Kirttivarman must have faced an invasion from Ibrahim. There is no evidence that Chandelas lost control of Kalanjara during his reign, so this invasion was probably a mere raid.

== Administration ==
The 1098 CE Deogadh inscription names one Vatsaraja as Kirttivarman's chief minister. It records the construction of a series of steps on the banks of the Betwa River, which flows by the Deogardh fort. It also states that Vatsaraja built the fort ("Kirttigiri-durga").

Ananta was another important minister of Kirttivarman. His father Mahipala had served Kirttivarman's father Vijayapala. Ananta held several positions, including Mantri (counsellor), Adhimata-Sachiva (approved minister), Hastyavaneta (leader of elephants and horses), and Purabaladhyaksha (in-charge of the defence of the capital).

Kirttivarman is believed to have commissioned the Kirat Sagar lake in Mahoba, the Kirat Sagar lake in Chanderi and the Budhiya Tal lake in Kalinjar are said to have been commissioned by Kirttivarman. According to folk tradition, he suffered from leprosy, and cured it by bathing in the Budhiya Tal.

== Religion ==
The inscriptions from Kirttivarman's reign suggest that he was a Shaivite but also patronized Vaishnavism and Jainism.

A Mau inscription portrays him as a righteous ruler who had conquered the six internal enemies. Unlike the previous Khajuraho temples featuring erotic sculptures, the temples built during and after Kirttivarman's reign do not feature sexual imagery. M. L. Varadpande believes that Kirttivarman shifted the Chandela capital from Khajuraho to Mahoba. Prabodhana-Chandrodaya, a play composed by Krishna Mishra during Kirttivarman's reign, is critical of overt sexual imagery in sculptural art. It ridicules the extreme Tantric sects like Kapalikas.

The wall of a Shiva temple near Parmala tank in Ajaygadh bears the legend Shri-Kirtijayeshvara. This probably refers to Kirttivarman.

== Coinage ==
The earliest of the extant Chandela coins are from Kirttivarman's reign. These are all gold coins weighing between 31 and 63 grains. The coins feature a seated goddess on one side, and the legend Shrimat Kirttivarmanmadeva on the other side. This style was originally introduced by the Kalachuri king Gangeya-deva. Kirttivarman may have adopted this style to commemorate his victory over Gangeya's son Lakshmi-Karna.
