= Gangeyadeva =

King of Tripuri from 1015 to 1041

- Paramabhattaraka Maharajadhiraja Parameshvara Vikramaditya
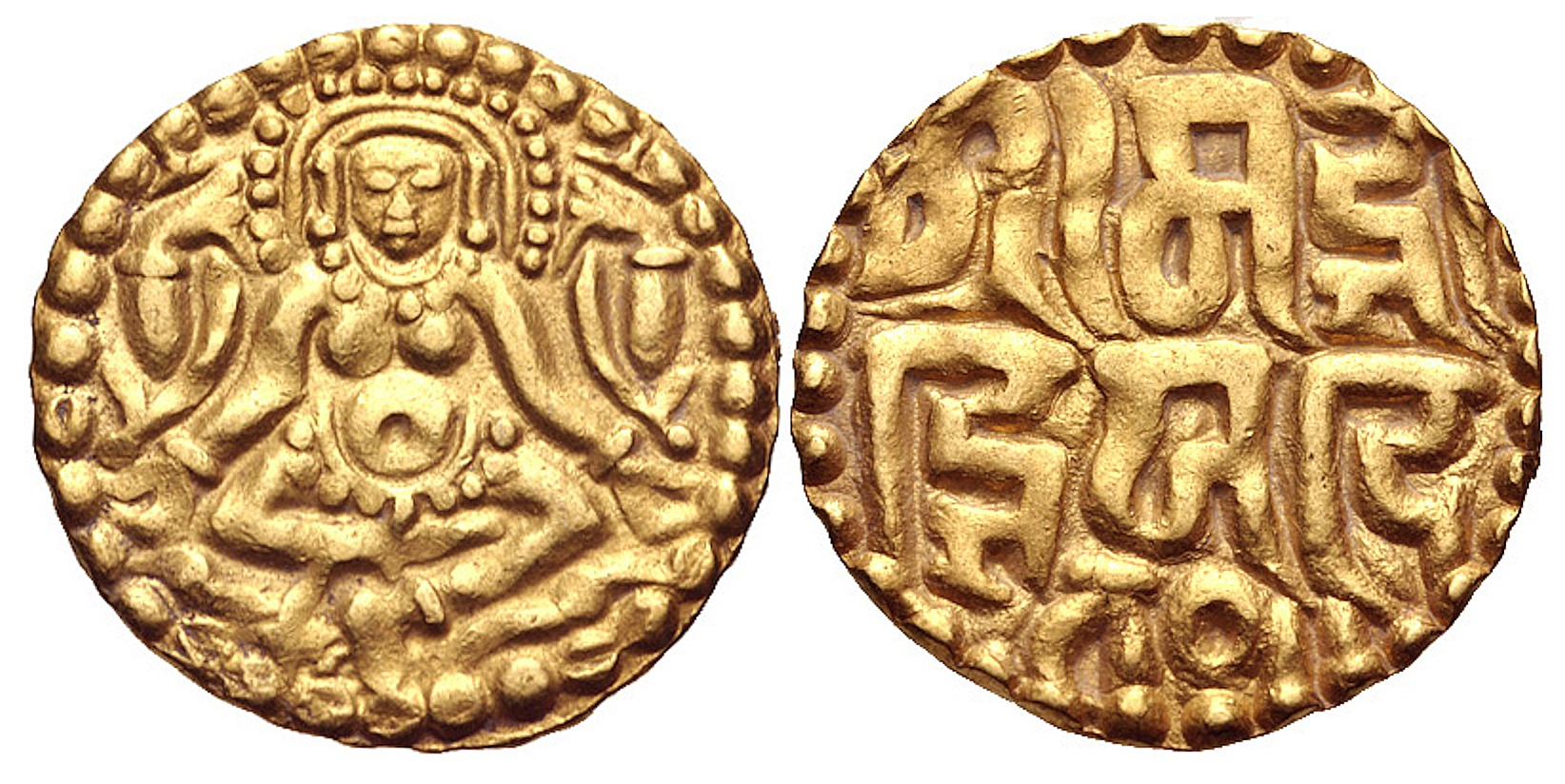
- Coinage of king Gangeyadeva (c. 1015–1041) of the Kalachuris of Tripuri. Obverse: Lakshmi seated. Reverse: "Śrimad Gangeya Devah" in three lines.

King of Dahala-Maṇḍala
- Reign: c. 1015 – 22 January 1041
- Predecessor: Kokalla II
- Successor: Lakshmikarna
- Died: 22 January 1041
- Issue: Lakshmikarna
- Dynasty: Kalachuris of Tripuri
- Father: Kokalla II

Gangeyadeva (IAST: Gaṅgeyadeva; died 22 January 1041) was a ruler of the Kalachuri dynasty of Tripuri in central India. His kingdom was centered around the Chedi or Dahala region in present-day Madhya Pradesh.

During the early part of his reign, Gangeyadeva seems to have ruled as a vassal, possibly that of the Paramara king Bhoja. He fought against the Chalukyas of Kalyani in an alliance with Bhoja, but was forced to retreat after some initial successes. In the 1030s, he raided several neighbouring kingdoms and established himself as a sovereign ruler. He appears to have annexed Varanasi to Kalachuri dominions.

== As a feudatory ==
Gangeyadeva succeeded his father Kokalla II on the throne of Tripuri around 1015. In his 1019 Mukundpur inscription, Gangeyadeva assumes the modest titles Maharha-Maha-Mahattaka and Maharaja. This title is not as high as the imperial title Maharajadhiraja, which suggests that Gangeyadeva was a feudatory to another king, possibly the Paramara king Bhoja.

=== Chalukyas of Kalyani ===
Gangeyadeva fought a war against the Chalukyas of Kalyani, possibly as a vassal of Bhoja. The triple alliance of Bhoja, Gangeyadeva and Rajendra Chola engaged the Chalukya king Jayasimha II at multiple frontiers.

The Kalachuri inscriptions boast that the king of Kuntala (that is, Jayasimha) abandoned his spear while wanting to run away from Gangeyadeva. The Chalukya inscriptions also claim success against their enemies. Thus, it appears that Gangeyadeva and his allies achieved some military successes in the beginning, but were ultimately forced to retreat.

== Paramaras ==
The Kalvan inscription, the Udaipur Prashasti inscription and Merutunga's Prabandha-Chintamani state that Bhoja defeated the ruler of Chedi. Parijata-Manjari (c. 1213 CE) by Bala Saraswati Madana, specifically identifies the defeated ruler as Gangeya. A verse engraved on a stone slab in Bhoj Shala also suggests that Bhoja defeated Gangeyadeva of Tripuri. The 1223 CE Dhar inscription of the Bhoja's descendant Arjunavarman also mentions Bhoja's victory over Gangeya.

It is not certain whether Bhoja defeated Gangeyadeva before or after their joint war against the Chalukyas of Kalyani. According to one theory, Bhoja defeated Gangeyadeva before his Chalukya campaign, in which Gangeyadeva must have fought as a Paramara vassal. V. V. Mirashi believed that Bhoja may have subjugated Gangeyadeva before 1019 CE, when Gangeyadeva issued his Mukundpur inscription.

A contradictory theory is that the two turned enemies after their campaign against the Chalukyas. Based on an inscription found at Mahoba, K. M. Munshi theorized that the two remained allies at least until 1025 CE. Based on the 1028 Kulenur inscription, K. N. Seth and Mahesh Singh believe that the Chalukyas and the Paramaras did not fight between 1028 CE and 1042 CE (after which Someshvara attacked Malwa). They believe that Bhoja may have used this time to launch an expedition against Gangeya.

== As a sovereign ==
In the later part of his reign, Gangeya achieved military successes at his eastern and northern frontiers. In his 1037-38 CE Piawan rock inscription, Gangeyadeva assumes the imperial titles Paramabhattaraka Maharajadhiraja Parameshvara. He also assumed the famous historical title Vikramaditya. The Persian writer Al-Biruni mentions him as the ruler of the Dahala country, and names his capital as "Tiauri" (Tripuri).

=== Eastern campaign ===
Gangeyadeva invaded the Utkala region in the east, where he is said to have "raised his own arm as a pillar of victory" on the eastern coast. In this campaign, he was probably assisted by the dynasty's Ratnapura branch, whose ruler Kamalaraja is said to have vanquished the ruler of Utkala. The defeated ruler was probably the Bhaumakara king Shubhakara II.

The Kalachuri records claim that Gangeyadeva also defeated the ruler of the Dakshina Kosala region. The defeated king was probably Yayati II of the Somavamshi dynasty. However, Yayati also claims to have defeated the king of Chedi and to have devastated his Dahala country. Thus, it appears that neither side gained a decisive victory in this war.

Gangeyadeva's son Karna assumed the title Tri-Kalingadhipati ("Lord of three Kalingas") in an inscription issued a year after the death of Gangeyadeva. It is possible that Karna inherited this title from his father, who might have assumed it after his successful campaign in the east (that is, the Kalinga region).

=== Northern conquests ===
According to a fragmentary Chandela inscription discovered at Mahoba, Bhoja and "Kalachuri-Chandra" worshipped the Chandela king Vidyadhara like scared pupils. Historians identify "Kalachuri-Chandra" (literally "Moon of the Kalachuris") with Gangeyadeva. According to one theory, Bhoja, aided by Gangeyadeva, invaded the Chandela kingdom, but Vidyadhara forced them to retreat. However, some scholars such as K. M. Munshi believe that the Mahoba inscription is merely a boastful exaggeration.

Later, Gangeyadeva expanded his kingdom in the north, as the Chandelas were weakened by Ghaznavid invasions. He seems to have achieved significant success against the Chandelas, as even the Chandela records describe him as jita-vishva ("world-conqueror"). A fragmentary Mahoba inscription of the Chandelas claims that their king Vijayapala broke the pride of Gangeyadeva in a battle.

Gangeyadeva seems to have extended his control over the sacred cities of Prayaga and Varanasi, in the Ganga-Yamuna valley. According to the Kalachuri records, he died in Prayaga. The writings of the Muslim chronicler Baihqui indicate that Varanasi was under Gangeyadeva's control in 1033-1034 CE. Varanasi had earlier been under the Pala rule, at least until 1016 CE (the Sarnath stone inscription from Mahipala is dated to this year). According to the Muslim chronicle, when Ahmad Niyaltigin (the Ghaznavid governor of Punjab) invaded Varanasi in 1033 CE, the city was under the rule of Ganga (that is, Gangeya-deva). The Ghaznavids plundered the city until noon, when they retreated, probably on the approach of the Kalachuri army.

Kalachuri inscriptions also credit Gangeyadeva with successful campaigns in Anga and Kira. Anga was ruled by the Palas. Kira (or Kara) is identified with the Kangra Valley. The Kangra Valley was held by the Ghaznavids, and Kalachuri claim of success in Kira appears to be a reference to Gangeyadeva's repulsion of the Ghaznavid attack.

The colophon of a Ramayana manuscript states that it was copied in Tirhut (in present-day Bihar), during the reign of Gangeyadeva. The manuscript describes the king as garuda-dhvaja, an epithet that seems to suggest that the king was a devotee of the god Vishnu, whose vahana is the mythical bird Garuda. English scholar Cecil Bendall wrongly read the term as gauda-dhvaja, based on which some scholars such as R. C. Majumdar wrongly theorized that the epithet indicated the Kalachuri king's conquest of the Gauda region in present-day Bengal. Historian V. V. Mirashi theorizes that the Gangeyadeva mentioned in the colophon was not a Kalachuri king at all: he belonged to a Rashtrakuta branch.

== Last days ==
Gangeyadeva installed a shivalinga at Piawan, which suggests that he was a Shaivite.

Kalachuri records state that Gangeyadeva attained salvation under the Akshayavata (sacred banyan tree) at Prayaga. His hundred wives are said to have committed suicide by immolation on his funeral pyre. He was succeeded by his son Lakshmikarna (alias Karna). Karna's 1042 CE Varanasi inscription, issued on the occasion of his father's first annual shraddha (death anniversary ritual) suggests that Gangeyadeva died on 22 January 1041.

== Coinage ==
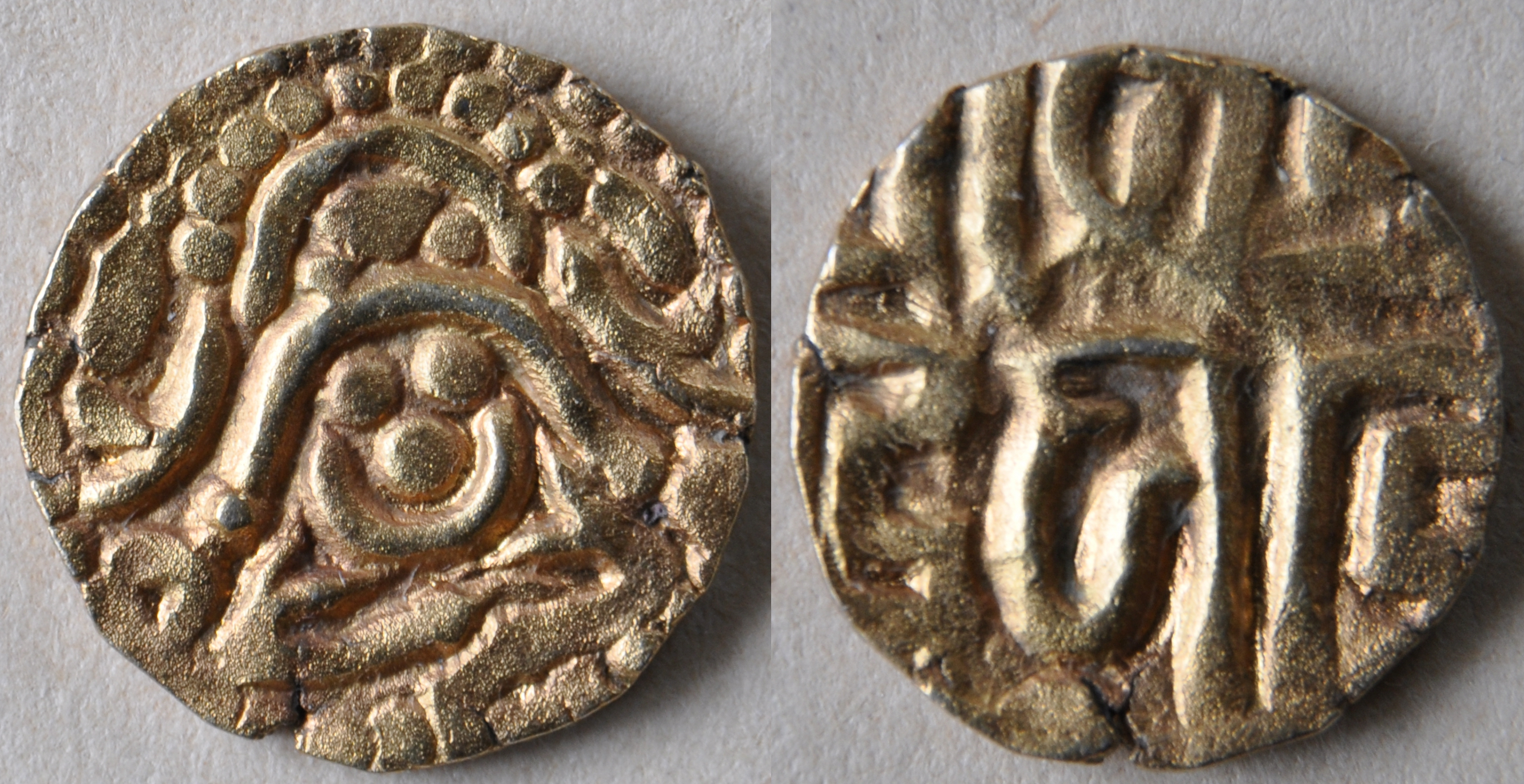
A statue of Gangeyadeva (circa 1015–1041) and his successors until 1211 of the Kalachuri (Haihaya or Chedi) empire (capital: Tripuri) in central India (Rajasthan, Madhya Pradesh). Dimension: 19 mm Weight: 3.84 g Material: Gold Rev:The inscription gives the name of the sovereign. Obv: Lakshmi, the goddess of fortune, in a sitting position. She has four arms.

Gangeyadeva issued coins featuring his name on one side, and a figure of goddess Lakshmi on the other side.
