= Trailokyamalla (Kalachuri dynasty) =

Ruler of the Kalachuri dynasty of Tripuri in central India

King of Chedi
- Reign: c. 1210s CE
- Predecessor: Vijayasimha
- Dynasty: Kalachuris of Tripuri
- Father: Vijayasimha

Trailokyamalla (r. c. 1210s CE), also called Trailokyamalladeva, was a ruler of the Kalachuri dynasty of central India. His kingdom was centered around the Chedi or Dahala region in present-day Madhya Pradesh. Trailokyamalla is the last known king of his dynasty. It is not known how and when his rule ended.

== Reign ==
Trailokyamalla was a son of the Kalachuri king Vijayasimha, as attested by the 1193 CE Jhulpur inscription, which records a grant made on Trailokyamalla's birthday. Vijayasimha's reign ended around 1210 CE.

Information about Trailokyamalla's reign comes from a 1212 CE (963 KE) inscription discovered at Dhureti near Rewa district. The inscription, which records a village grant, mentions the traditional high-sounding imperial Kalachuri titles for Trailokyamalla. The find spot of the inscription suggests that he retained the territories that he inherited from his father. The inscription also calls him the lord of Kanyakubja (modern Kannauj): in absence of any corroborative evidence, it is not certain if he actually managed to capture Kanyakubja.

Trailokyamalla is the last known king of his dynasty. It is not known when and how his rule ended. The 1256 CE Rahatgarh inscription of the Paramara king Jayavarman II indicates that the Paramaras had captured the eastern part of the Kalachuri kingdom by the mid-13th century. The 1287 CE Hindoria inscription suggests that the Chandelas had conquered the western part of the Kalachuri kingdom by this time. The 1309 CE Bamhni inscription proves that by the early 14th century, a part of the former Kalachuri territory had been captured by the Delhi Sultanate. The 1310 CE Purushottampuri inscription of the Yadava king Ramachandra also states that he defeated the king of the Dahala country. However, it is not certain if the defeated ruler was a Kalachuri king, as the inscription does not mention the name or the dynasty of the defeated ruler.
