= Gayakarna =

Ruler of the Kalachuri dynasty of Tripuri in central India

King of Dahala
- Reign: c. 1123–1153 CE
- Predecessor: Yashahkarna
- Successor: Narasimha
- Spouse: Alhanadevi
- Issue: Narasimha, Jayasimha
- Dynasty: Kalachuris of Tripuri
- Father: Yashahkarna

Gayakarna (IAST: Gaya-karṇa; r. c. 1123–1153 CE) was a ruler of the Kalachuri dynasty of Tripuri in central India. His kingdom was centered around the Chedi or Dahala region in present-day Madhya Pradesh.

Gayakarna married Alhanadevi, a granddaughter of the Paramara king Udayaditya, which led to peace between the two kingdoms. However, he lost some territory to the Chandela king Madanavarman. The Kalachuri vassals at Ratnapura declared their independence during his reign.

== Reign ==
Gayakarna succeeded his father Yashahkarna as the Kalachuri king.

Gayakarna seems to have lost some of his northern territory to the Chandela king Madanavarman. The Mau inscription of Madanavarman's minister Gadadhara states that the king fled on listening Madanavarman's name. The Chandelas seem to have captured the northern part of Baghelkhand, as suggested the discovery of Madanavarman's coins at Panwar in this region.

The Ratnapura Kalachuri branch, whose kings had earlier served as vassals of the Tripuri Kalachuris, declared its independence during Gayakarna's reign. Gayakarna sent an army to reduce the Ratnapura chief Ratnadeva II to submission, but it was defeated.

== Personal life ==
Gayakarna married Alhanadevi, a daughter of the Guhila king Vijayasimha. Her mother Shyamaladevi was a daughter of the Paramara king Udayaditya. This marriage led to peace between the Paramaras and the Kalachuris.

Because of Alhanadevi's patronage, the Pashupata Shaivite religious leaders rose to prominence in the Kalachuri kingdom. Gayakarna's rajaguru (royal preceptor) was Shakti-shiva.

Gayakarna was succeeded by his sons Narasimha and Jayasimha one after another.
