= Kulenur =

Kulenur Gm Sugars
- village
- Nickname: ಅಳಿಯಾ ಮಾವಂದಿರ ಊರು
- Location in Karnataka, India Kulenur (India)
- Coordinates: 14.763377°N 75.312792°E
- Country: India
- State: Karnataka

Government
  - Type: Panchayat raj
  - Body: Gram panchayat

Languages
  - Official: Kannada
- Time zone: UTC+5:30 (IST)
- ISO 3166 code: IN-KA
- Vehicle registration: KA
- Website: karnataka.gov.in

Kulenur is a village in Haveri District, Karnataka, India. It is located 10 km from Haveri city. The river Varada passes nearby. A co-operative sugar factory is located 1 km from Kulenur. Most of the population are involved in agriculture.

== Schools and Colleges ==
The government of Karnataka runs two free schools for students from Kulenur and surrounding villages. HPS Kulenur and GHS Kulenur.
