= Narasimha (Kalachuri dynasty) =

Ruler of Tripuri (c. 1153–1163)

King of Dahala
- Reign: c. 1153–1163 CE
- Predecessor: Gayakarna
- Successor: Jayasimha
- Dynasty: Kalachuris of Tripuri
- Father: Gayakarna

Narasimha (IAST: Nara-siṃha; r. c. 1153–1163 CE) was a ruler of the Kalachuri dynasty of Tripuri in central India. His kingdom was centered around the Chedi or Dahala region in present-day Madhya Pradesh.

Narasimha was a son of the Kalachuri king Gayakarna. Narasimha's rajaguru (royal preceptor) was Kirti-shiva.

Narasimha inscriptions have been found to the north of the Kaimur Range. This suggests that he recovered the territory that his father had lost to the Chandela king Madanavarman.

Narasimha seems to have died without a male heir, as he was succeeded by his brother Jayasimha.
