= Jayasimha (Kalachuri dynasty) =

Ruler of the Kalachuri dynasty of Tripuri in central India

King of Dahala
- Reign: c. 1163–1188 CE
- Predecessor: Narasimha
- Successor: Vijayasimha
- Spouse: Gosaladevi, Kelhanadevi
- Issue: Vijayasimha
- Dynasty: Kalachuris of Tripuri
- Father: Gayakarna

Jayasimha (IAST: Jaya-siṃha; r. c. 1163–1188 CE) was a ruler of the Kalachuri dynasty of Tripuri in central India. His kingdom was centered around the Chedi or Dahala region in present-day Madhya Pradesh. He unsuccessfully tried to assert his authority over the Kalachuris of Ratnapura, and seems to have suffered a defeat against the Chandelas.

== Reign ==
Jayasimha was a son of the Kalachuri king Gayakarna, and succeeded his elder brother Narasimha on the throne.

The Kalachuris of Ratnapura, who had earlier served as vassals of the Tripuri Kalachuris, had declared independence during Gayakarna's reign. Jayasimha led an expedition to force them into submission. A battle was fought at Shivrinarayan, in which Jayasimha seems to have suffered a defeat.

Jayasimha also suffered a defeat against the Chandela king Paramardi, as suggested by Paramardi's Mahoba inscription. He, however, retained control of the Tamsa River valley to the north of the Kaimur Range, which his brother had recovered from the Chandelas. This region was governed by his feudatory Maharanaka Kirttivarman, who ruled at Karkaredi (modern Kakredi in Rewa district).

== Personal life ==
Jayasimha's queens were Gosaladevi and Kelhanadevi. Gosaladevi established the Gosalpur town near Jabalpur. Jayasimha was succeeded by Vijayasimha, his son from Gosaladevi. The couple had another son named Ajayasimha.

Jayasimha's rajaguru (royal preceptor) was Vimala-shiva.
