= Vijayasimha =

Ruler of the Kalachuri dynasty of Tripuri in central India

King of Dahala
- Reign: c. 1188–1210 CE
- Predecessor: Jayasimha
- Successor: Trailokyamalla
- Issue: Trailokyamalla
- Dynasty: Kalachuris of Tripuri
- Father: Jayasimha
- Mother: Gosaladevi

Vijayasimha (IAST: Vijaya-siṃha; r. c. 1188–1210 CE) was a ruler of the Kalachuri dynasty of Tripuri in central India. His kingdom was centered around the Chedi or Dahala region in present-day Madhya Pradesh.

== Reign ==
Vijayasimha succeeded his father Jayasimha as the Kalachuri king. His mother was Gosaladevi, and he had a brother named Ajayasimha.

Sallakshana, a feudatory of Vijayasimha, declared independence during his reign. However, another feudatory named Malayasimha defeated Sallakshana in a battle fought at Karkaredi (modern Kakredi in Rewa district). This battle is recorded in the 1193 CE Rewa stone inscription. Malayasimha also defeated a ruler named Vikrama, whose identity is not certain.

Some earlier scholars believed that Vijayasimha lost control of the northern portion of his kingdom to the Chandela king Trailokyavarman. This theory was based on the identification of "Trailokyamalla" mentioned in an inscription with Trailokyavarman. However, the discovery of the 1197 CE Jhulpur inscription nullifies this assumption: Trailokyamalla was the name of Vijayasimha's son and successor.

Vijayasimha had a brother named Ajayasimha, who is mentioned as Maharajakumara ("son of the great king") in two inscription issued during Vijayasimha's reign. Earlier scholars assumed that he was a son of Vijayasimha, but the discovery of the 1193 CE Umaria inscription shows that he was a brother of Vijayasimha.

== Inscriptions ==
At least eight inscriptions from Vijayasimha's reign, all dated in the Kalachuri Era, have been discovered. These inscriptions range from 1180-81 CE (932 KE) to 1208-09 or 1210-11 CE (96? KE).

An 1193 CE (944 KE) copper-plate inscription discovered at Umaria in Panna district records the grant of three villages to several Brahmanas by his subordinate Ranaka Kumarapala. The inscription was transferred to the Rani Durgavati Museum in Jabalpur.

An 1197 CE (949 KE) copper-plate inscription discovered at Jhulpur in Mandla district records the grant of Hatim village to a Brahmana named Vidyadhara-sharman of the Bhargava gotra. The grant was made on the birthday of Vijayasimha's son Trailokyamalla. The inscription was transferred to the Government Museum at Mandla.
