= Karitalai =

- village
- Ruins at Karitalai

- Location in Madhya Pradesh, India Karitalai (India)
- Coordinates: 24.0564°N 80.7153°E
- Country: India
- State: Madhya Pradesh
- District: Katni
- Tehsil: Vijayraghavgarh

Government
  - Body: Panchayat

Area
  - Total: 13.14 km^{2} (5.07 sq mi)

Population (2011)
  - Total: 5,197
  - Density: 395.5/km^{2} (1,024/sq mi)
- Time zone: UTC+5:30 (IST)
- Pincode: 483880

Karitalai, also known as Kari Talai, is a village in the Katni district of Madhya Pradesh, India. It is administered as part of the Vijayraghavgarh tehsil.

== History ==
Ruins of several old temples exist at Karitalai. The following Sanskrit-language inscriptions have been discovered here:

- An inscription in the undeciphered shell letters.
- A land grant inscripton of the Uchchhakalpa king Jayanatha dated to year 174 of an unspecified era; the era is generally identified as the Gupta era, placing the inscription in 493-494 CE.
- A fragmentary inscription found affixed to the Devi Madhia temple, issued during the reign of the Kalachuri king Lakshmana-raja I, and dated to year 593 of the Kalachuri era (841-842 CE).
- A 10th century inscription of the Kalachuri king Yuvaraja-deva I (r. c. 915-945 CE). It records the construction of a well in Soma-svami-pura (present-day Karitalai) by his minister Someshvara.
- A stone inscription of the Kalachuri king Lakshmana-raja II (r. c. 945-970 CE), now at the Nagpur museum; records the construction of a Vishnu-Varaha temple named "Someshvara-svamini" by Someshvara

A 1355 CE sati inscription from the reign of king Virama-deva of Uchahada-nagara (Unchehara)

- Label inscriptions on five Jain statues: two of the labels mention Deva-bhadra and his wife Yashomati; the rest mention Jaina-chandra, Satya-chandra, and Yashodhara.

The National Monuments Authority of India designated the following ruined monuments in Karitalai as Centrally Protected:

- Figures of Hindu and Jain deities scattered over four mounds and a banyan tree in the Karanpur locality; includes a statue of Varaha (Vishnu) and a statue of Mahadeva (Shiva)
- Image of Varaha
- Two stone statues representing the Kurma (tortoise) and Matsya (fish) avatars of Vishnu, locally known as "Kachha and Machha"

In August 2006, nine sculptures were stolen from a locked shed in Karitalai and Bilhari. These sculptures later appeared in art dealers' catalogues, and two of them were recovered by the Interpol and the Homeland Security Investigations (HSI) of the United States. As of 2025, both the recovered scultpures were in possession of the HSI. Scholar K. L. Mankodi suspects that Subhash Kapoor's network was responsible for smuggling these artifacts out of India.

== Demographics ==
According to the 2011 census of India, Karitalai has 1,232 households with 5,197 people, including 2,628 men and 2,569 women. The effective literacy rate (the percentage of literate persons among the population aged 7 years and above) was 72.95%. The population included 711 Scheduled Caste (SC) persons and 1,204 Scheduled Tribe (ST) persons.
