= Bilhari =

- village
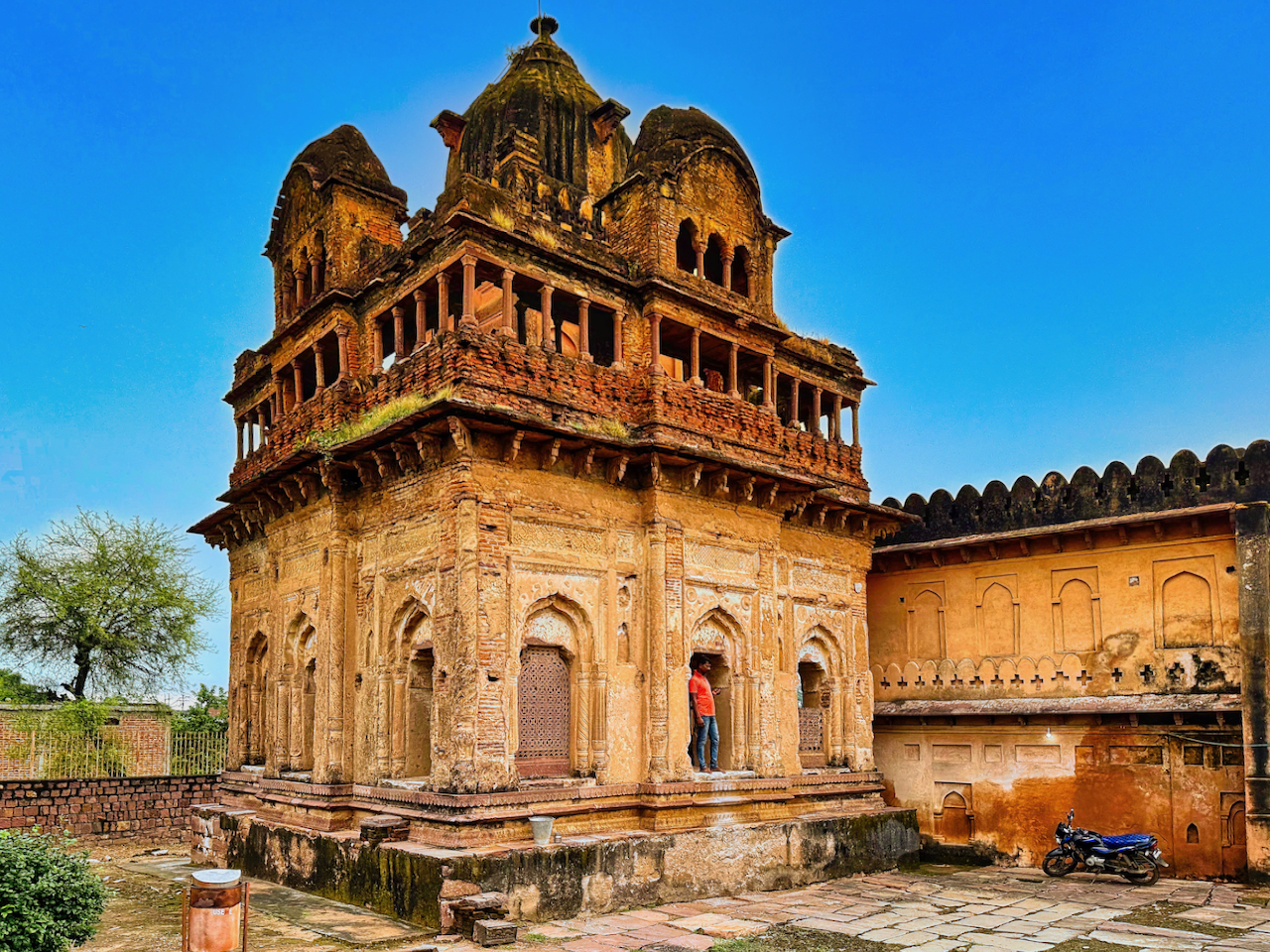
- Ruins of Tapasi Matha, a Shaiva Hindu monastery, at Bilhari

- Location in Madhya Pradesh, India Bilhari (India)
- Coordinates: 23.7949°N 80.2750°E
- Country: India
- State: Madhya Pradesh
- District: Katni
- Tehsil: Rithi

Government
  - Body: Bilehari Gram Panchayat

Area
  - Total: 7.9732 km^{2} (3.0785 sq mi)

Population (2011)
  - Total: 7,278
  - Density: 912.8/km^{2} (2,364/sq mi)
- Time zone: UTC+5:30 (IST)
- Pincode: 483501

Bilhari, also known as Bilehari, is a village in the Katni district of Madhya Pradesh, India. It is administered as part of the Rithi tehsil.

== History ==
Bilhari was historically known as Pushpavati. The place appears to have been a major administrative and religious center during the Kalachuri rule. An inscription found at the site records royal patronage to a tenth-century Shaivite temple and a Matta-mayura monastic community.

Sculptural fragments discovered here suggest that multiple Shaiva, Vaishnava, and Jaina temples were located here. Buddhist sculptures have also been found at the site. In August 2006, nine sculptures were stolen from Bilhari and Karitalai. These sculptures later appeared in art dealers' catalogues, and two of them were recovered by the Interpol and the Homeland Security Investigations (HSI) of the United States. As of 2025, both the recovered sculptures were in possession of the HSI. Scholar K. L. Mankodi suspects that Subhash Kapoor's network was responsible for smuggling these artifacts out of India.

There are 85 temples and 13 stepwells in and around Bilhari.

== Demographics ==
According to the 2011 census of India, Bilhari has 1,654 households with 7,278 people, including 3,784 men and 3,494 women. The effective literacy rate (the percentage of literate persons among the population aged 7 years and above) was 74.74%. The population included 1,432 Scheduled Caste (SC) persons and 717 Scheduled Tribe (ST) persons.
