= Kalachuris of Tripuri =

Central Indian dynasty (675–1212)

- 675–1212
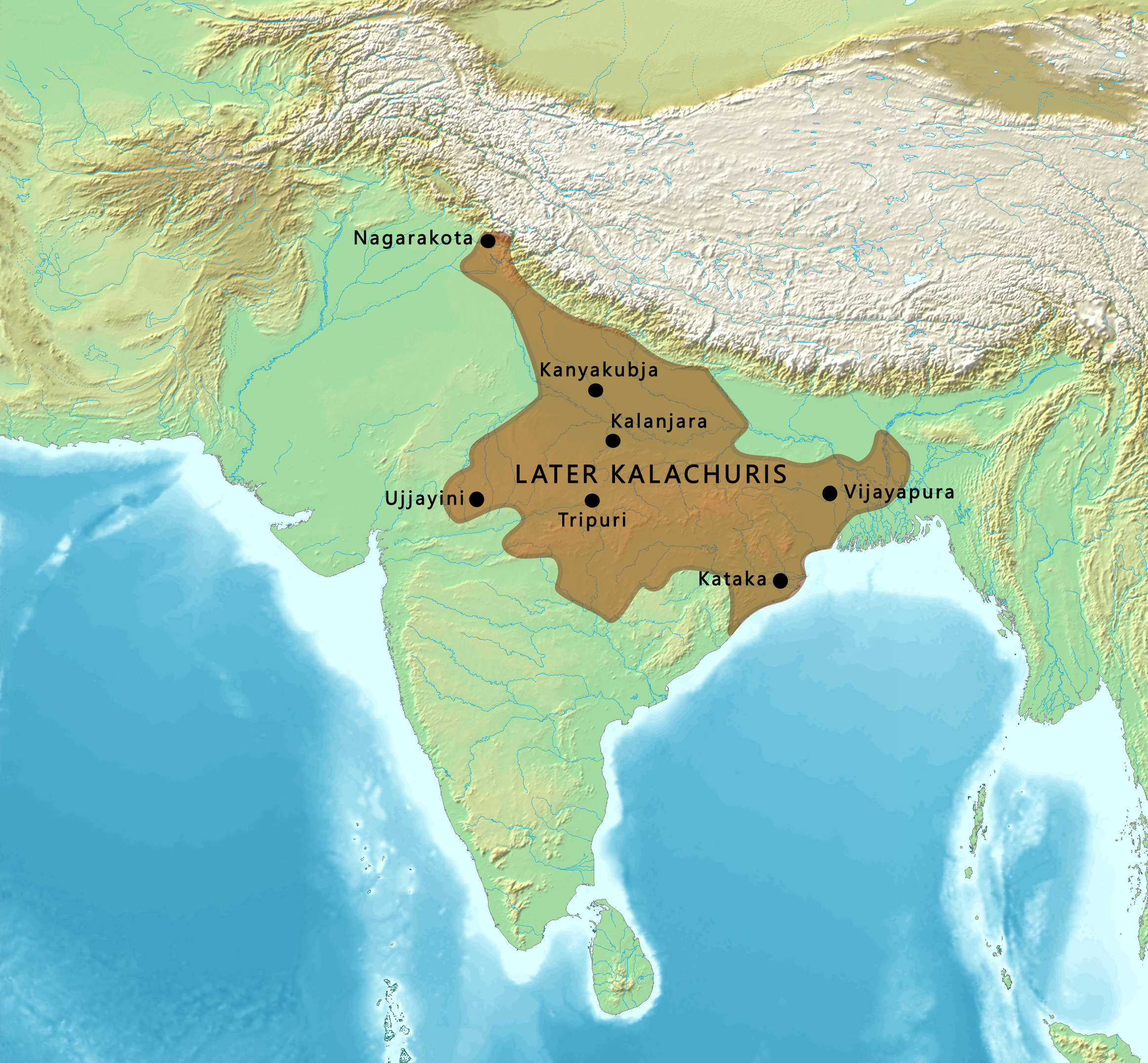
- Territory of the Later Kalacuris during the reign of Lakshmikarna, circa 1050 CE.
- Capital: Tripuri
- Religion: Hinduism; Jainism; Buddhism
- Government: Monarchy
- King
  - 675–700: Vamaraja-deva (first)
  - 1210–1212: Trailokyamalla (last)
Preceded by
Gurjara-Pratiharas
Succeeded by
Gahadavala
Chandelas
Paramaras
Kalachuris of Ratnapura
- Today part of: India

The Kalachuris of Tripuri (IAST: Kalacuri), also known the Kalachuris of Chedi, ruled parts of central India during 7th to 13th centuries. They are also known as the Later Kalachuris to distinguish them from their earlier namesakes, especially the Kalachuris of Mahishmati. Their core territory included the historical Chedi region (also known as Dahala-mandala), and their capital was located at Tripuri (present-day Tewar near Jabalpur, Madhya Pradesh).

The origin of the dynasty is uncertain, although one theory connects them to the Kalachuris of Mahishmati. By the 10th century, the Kalachuris of Tripuri had consolidated their power by raiding neighbouring territories and by fighting wars with the Gurjara-Pratiharas, the Chandelas and the Paramaras. They also had matrimonial relations with the Rashtrakutas and the Chalukyas of Kalyani.

In the 1030s, the Kalachuri king Gangeyadeva assumed imperial titles after achieving military successes at his eastern and northern frontiers. The kingdom reached its zenith during the reign of his son Lakshmikarna (1041-1073 CE), who assumed the title Chakravartin after military campaigns against several neighbouring kingdoms. He also controlled a part of the Paramara and Chandela kingdoms for a brief period.

The dynasty gradually declined after Lakshmikarna, whose successors lost control of their northern territories to the Gahadavalas. Trailokyamalla, the last known ruler of the dynasty, ruled at least until 1212 CE, but it is not certain how and when his reign ended. In the later half of the 13th century, the former Kalachuri territories came under the control of the Paramaras and the Chandelas, and ultimately under the Delhi Sultanate. A branch of the dynasty, the Kalachuris of Ratnapura, ruled at Ratnapura (now Ratanpur) in present-day Chhattisgarh.

== Origins ==
The Kalachuris of Tripuri alternatively called themselves Haihayas in some of their records: the earliest such records are the Bilahari stone inscriptions of Yuvaraja-deva II. The dynasty traced its ancestry to the legendary lunar dynasty, claiming descent from the legendary Haihaya ruler Kartavirya Arjuna, who ruled from Mahishmati. This claim occurs in several Kalachuri inscriptions, including the Gyaraspur inscription of prince Valleka (a son of Kokalla I), the Varanasi inscription of Karna, and the Khairha inscription of Yashahkarna. Some of these inscriptions, such as the Khairha inscription, trace Kartavirya's ancestry to Chandra (the moon deity) through the Pauravas and Bharata. According to the 12th century poem Prithviraja Vijaya, the dynasty descended from Kartavirya Arjuna through one Sahasika ("courageous"), who was a maternal ancestor of the poem's hero Prithviraja III. The poem also traces Kartavirya's mythical ancestry to Chandra, through his son Budha (the mercury).

Historian V. V. Mirashi theorises that the Kalachuris of Tripuri descended from the Kalachuris of Mahishmati, who ruled in the west-central India during 6th-7th centuries. According to this theory, after facing setbacks against the Chalukyas in the south, the Kalachuris expanded their power in the north; amid the political chaos after the decline of Harsha's empire, Buddharaja's successor Vama-raja established himself at Kalanjara in the late 7th century, and finally moved to Tripuri. Because of their rule over the Dahala or Chedi region, the family came to be known as the Kalachuris of Dahala and the Chaidyas ("[lords] of the Chedi country").

However, there is no concrete evidence that conclusively proves that the two dynasties were related. No extant records of the Mahishmati dynasty describe them as "Haihayas", although records of their neighbours - the Chalukyas - refer to them by this name.

== History ==
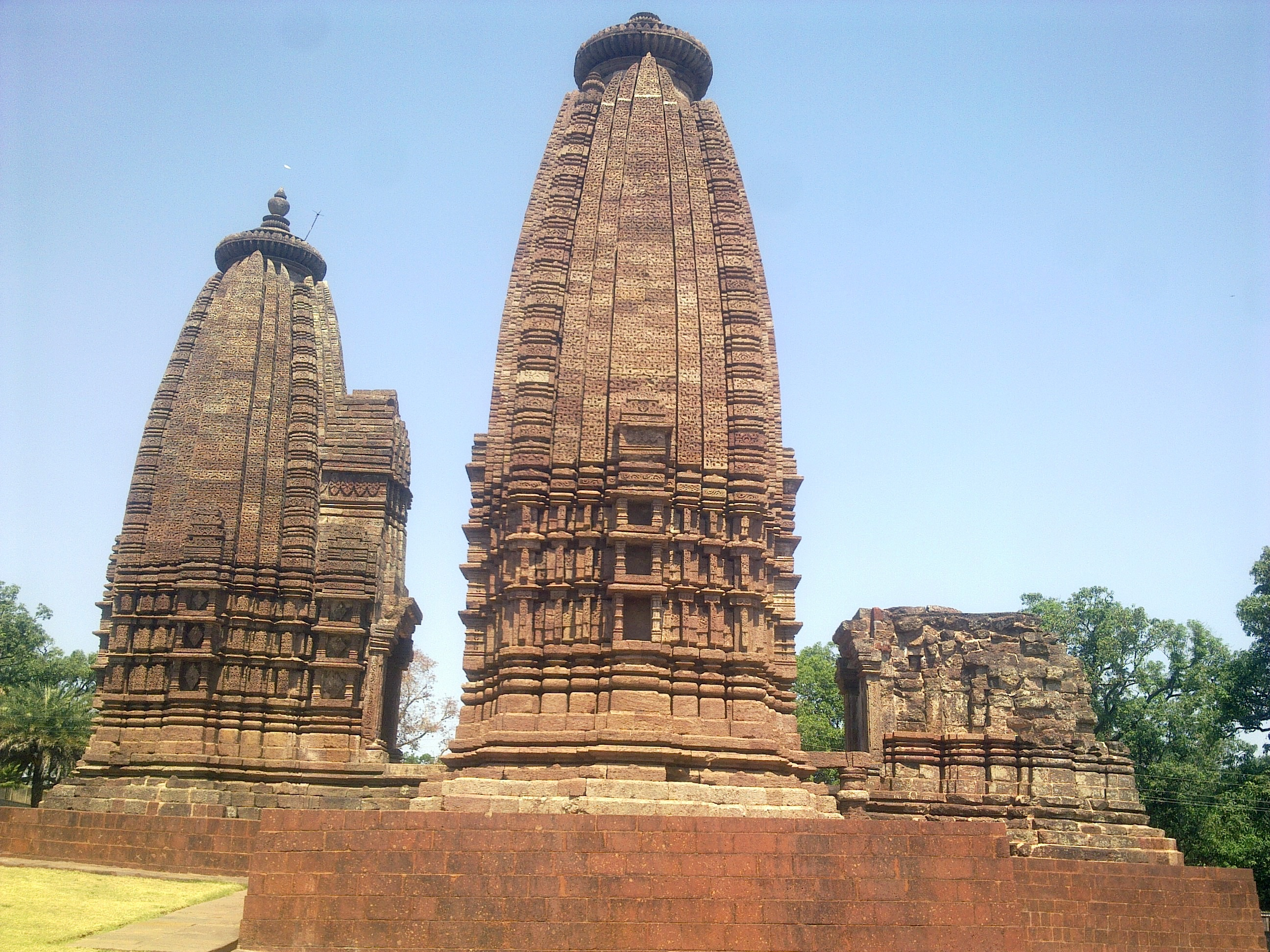
The Karna temple at Amarkantak, built by Lakshmikarna

Little is known about the earliest rulers of the dynasty, who find mentions in the inscriptional genealogies. The earliest known inscriptions of the dynasty have been discovered at Chhoti Deori and Sagar. These inscriptions are from the reign of Shankaragana I, and have been dated to the 8th century CE.

=== As Rashtrakuta and Pratihara feudatories ===
The Karitalai inscription of Lakshmana-raja I (825-850 CE) eulogises a Rashtrakuta king (whose name is lost), and mentions the defeat of one Nagabhata (presumably the Gurjara-Pratihara king Nagabhata II). This suggests that during this time, the Kalachuris were subordinate to their southern neighbours - the Rashtrakuta emperors, and fought against their northern neighbours - the Pratihara emperors. They had multiple marital connections to the Rashtrakutas. However, by the time of Lakshmanaraja's son or grandson Kokalla I (r. c. 850-890 CE), they had shifted their allegiance to the Pratiharas.

Kokalla I appears to have been the first powerful ruler of the dynasty, as he finds regular mentions in the genealogies of the later Kalachuri rulers. According to the Ratnapura Kalachuri inscriptions, he had 18 sons, the eldest of whom succeeded him on the throne, while the others became provincial governors. The number 18 probably should not be taken literally in this context, as it was considered an auspicious number, and in this context, may have been used to indicate that Kokalla had many sons. The eldest son was presumably Shankaragana II, whom modern scholars identify with the person mentioned by the names "Prasiddha-dhavala", "Mugdha-tunga", and "Rana-vigraha" in various sources. Of the other sons, an unnamed prince became the progenitor of the Ratnapura branch. Other sons of Kokalla I included Arjuna, who is mentioned in Rashtrakuta inscriptions; and Valleka or Vallavati, who is known by his Gyaraspur inscription.

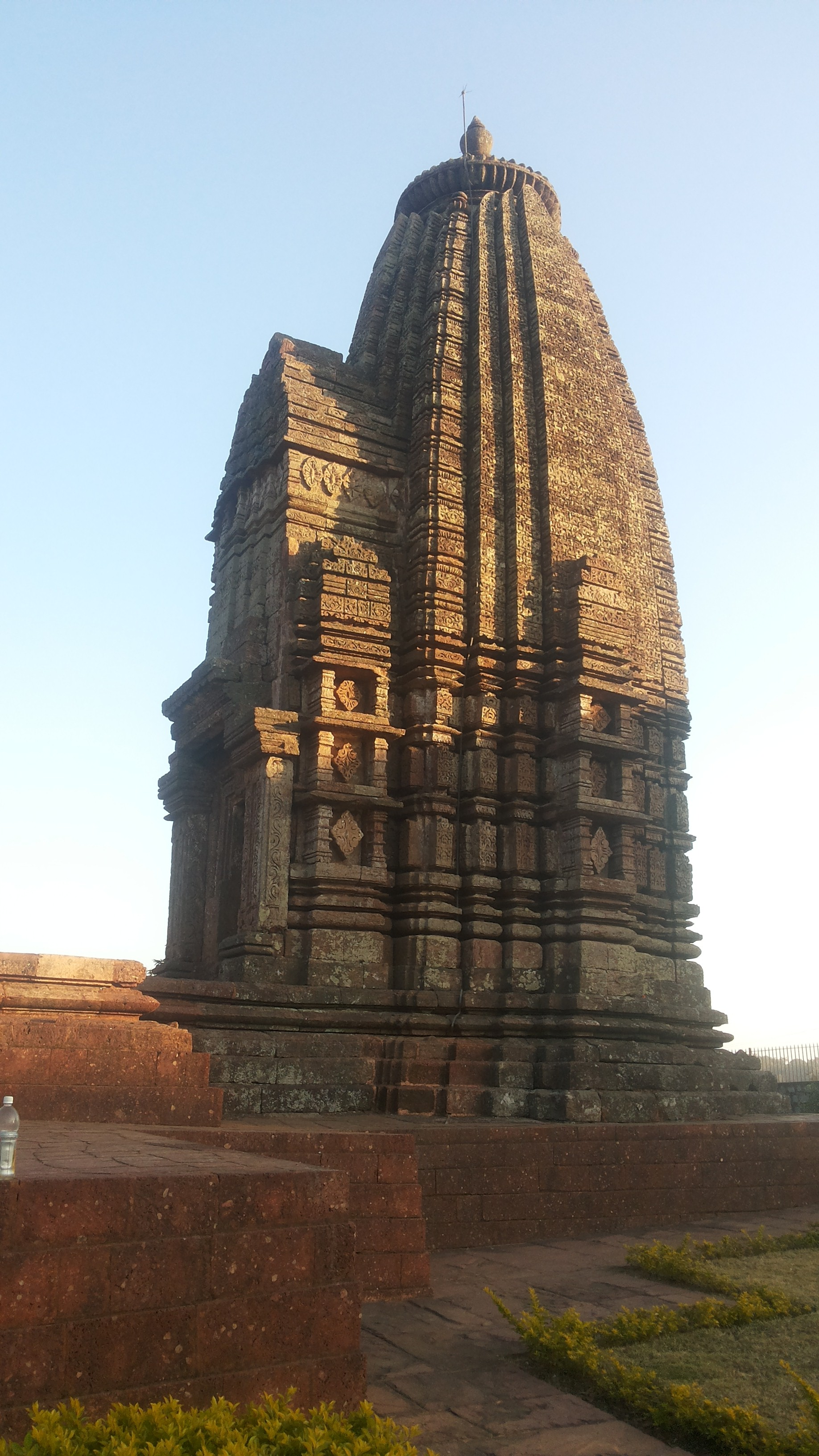
Amarkantak Temple.

Valleka's inscription states that he was a son of queen Nata, who can be identified with the Chandela princess "Natta" mentioned as a wife of Kokalla in the Varanasi inscription of the later ruler Karna. Valleka appears to have been the last (or one of the last) Kalachuri governor of the area around Gyaraspur, which subsequently became a part of the Chandela territory. The inscription states that Valleka served king Bhoja, who is described as the ruler of the earth, and mentions that Valleka defeated several other kings in Bhoja's service. King Bhoja can be identified with the Gurjara-Pratihara emperor Mihira Bhoja, who is also mentioned in other Kalachuri inscriptions. These other inscriptions include the Bilhari inscription, which describes Bhoja as one of the "pillars of glory" erected by Kokalla I; and the Varanasi inscription, which describes Bhoja as a recipient of Kokalla's protection. The descriptions in these two inscriptions had led earlier scholars to believe that Kokalla subjugated Bhoja, but Valleka's inscription suggests that the Kalachuris were subordinate to the Pratihara emperor Bhoja.

Based on Valleka's inscription, epigraphist Richard G. Salomon theorises that Kokalla I was a subordinate of Bhoja, and played an important role in expanding the south-eastern borders of the Pratihara empire. His submission to Bhoja may have been nominal, and he appears to have laid the foundation of Kalachuri empire by expanding his own sphere of influence in the southern part of the Pratihara empire. The later Kalachuri inscriptions greatly exaggerate Kokalla's glory, and use wording that plays down the subordinate position of the Kalachuris.

=== Early sovereigns ===
After the decline of the Rashtrakuta and Pratihara empires, the Kalachuris assumed independence, probably during the reign of Yuvaraja-deva I (915-945 CE).

Shankaragana III, who ascended the Kalachuri throne around 970 CE, adopted an aggressive expansion policy. He defeated the contemporary Gurjara-Pratihara king, who was probably Vijayapala. He probably died in a battle against the Chandelas. Shankaragana was succeeded by his younger brother Yuvarajadeva II, who established matrimonial relations with the Kalyani Chalukya ruler Tailapa II. The Paramara Munja, who was an enemy of Tailapa, invaded the Kalachuri kingdom and raided their capital Tripuri. After the death of Yuvarajadeva II, the ministers placed his son Kokalla II on the throne.

According to the Gurgi inscription of Kokalla, three neighbouring kings were afraid of him: the Gurjara king (possibly the weak Gurjara-Pratihara ruler Rajyapala), the Gauda king (the Pala ruler Mahipala), and the Kuntala king (the Kalayani Chalukya king Vikramaditya V). These claims suggest that Kokalla raided the territories of these kings.

Gangeyadeva, the son and successor of Kokalla II, ascended the throne around 1015 CE. During the early part of his reign, he served as a vassal to another king, possibly the Paramara king Bhoja. He fought a war against the Chalukyas of Kalyani, possibly as a vassal of Bhoja. The triple alliance of Bhoja, Gangeyadeva and Rajendra Chola engaged the Chalukya king Jayasimha II at multiple frontiers. Both Kalachuri and Chalukya inscriptions claim success in this war: it appears that Gangeyadeva and his allies were repulsed after achieving some initial successes.

Bhoja defeated Gangeyadeva in a war, but there is some uncertainty regarding the exact chronology. According to one theory, Bhoja defeated Gangeyadeva before the anti-Chalukya campaign, in which Gangeyadeva fought as a Paramara vassal. Another theory is that the two turned enemies after their campaign against the Chalukyas.

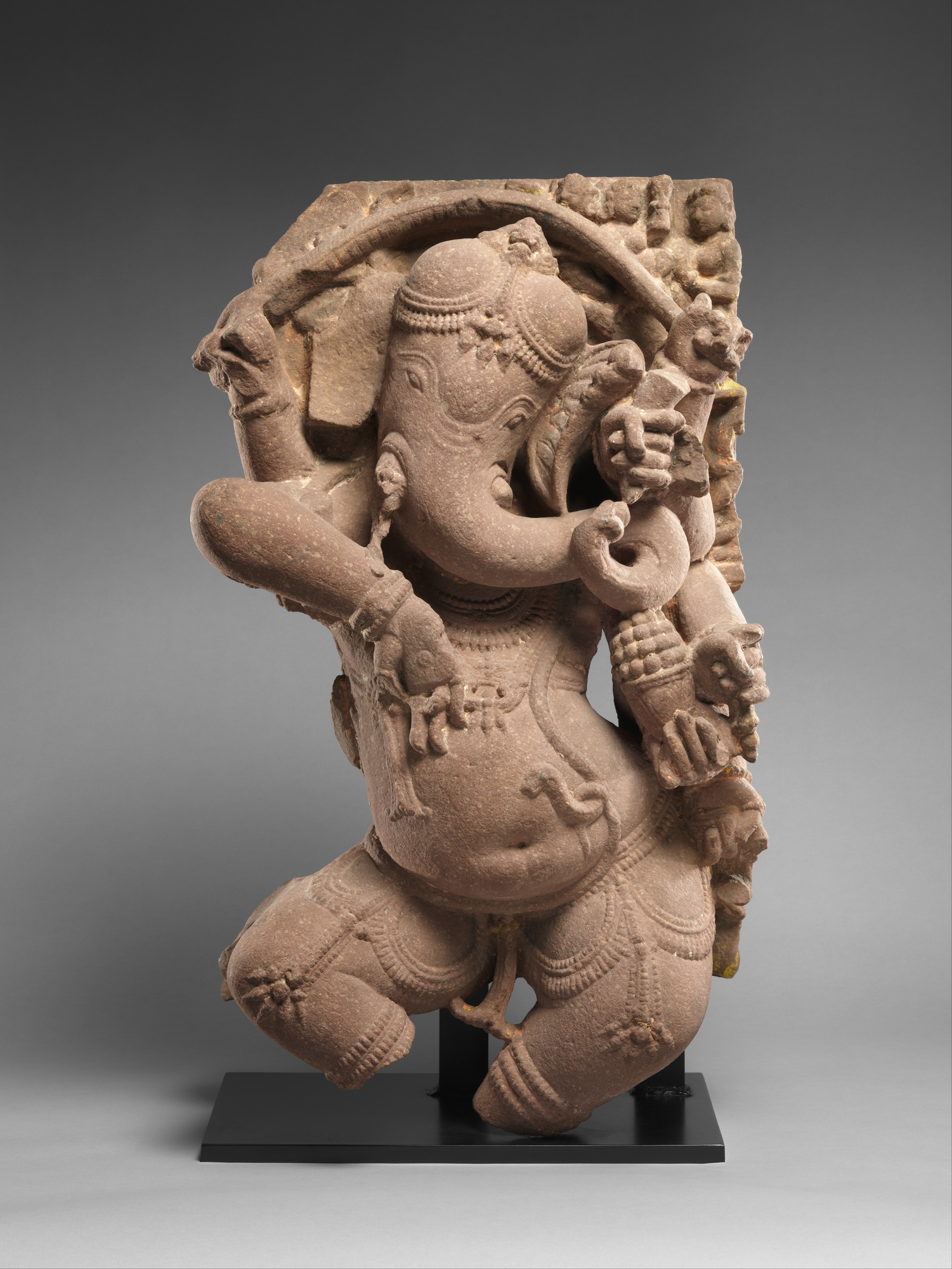
Dancing Ganesha, Madhya Pradesh, Kalacuri, 10th century CE.

=== Expansion ===
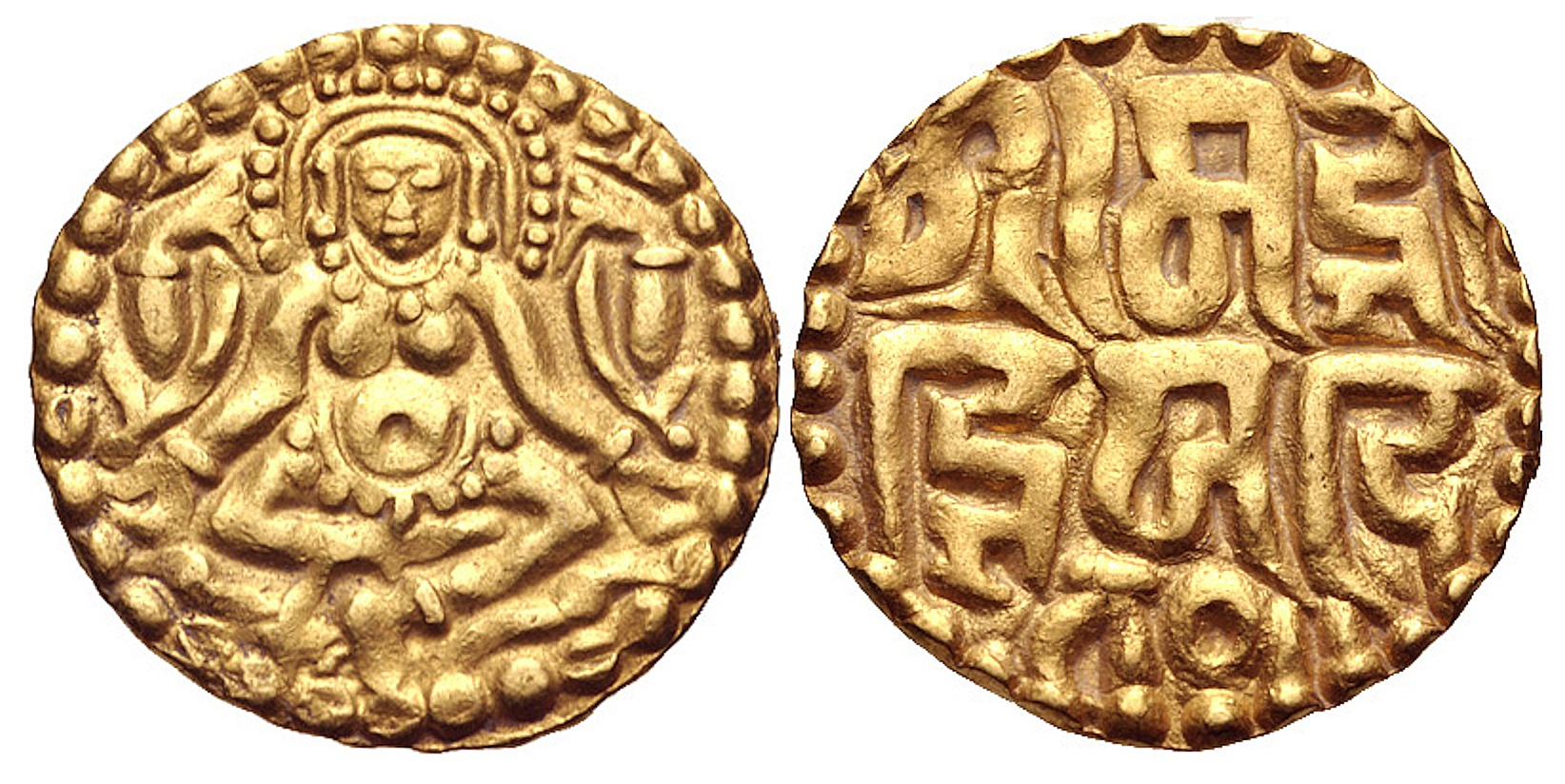
Gold coin of king Gangeyadeva (c. 1015–1041) of the Kalachuris of Tripuri. Obverse: Lakshmi seated. Reverse: "Śrimad Gangeya Devah" in three lines.

In the 1030s, Gangeyadeva achieved military successes at his eastern and northern frontiers, and assumed the titles of a sovereign emperor. In the east, he raided Utkala, assisted by his Ratnapura vassals. The Kalachuris probably defeated the Bhauma-Kara king Shubhakara II in this war. Gangeyadeva also seems to have fought an inconclusive war against Yayati, the Somavanshi ruler of Dakshina Kosala.

In the north, Gangeyadeva expanded his kingdom at the expense of the Chandelas, who had been weakened by Ghaznavid invasions. He suffered a defeat against the Chandela king Vijayapala, but ultimately extended his control over the sacred cities of Varanasi and Prayaga. During his reign, the Ghaznavid general Ahmad Niyaltigin raided Varanasi in 1033 CE.

Gangeyadeva's successor Lakshmikarna (r. c. 1041-1073 CE), was the most noted military commander of the dynasty. He assumed the title Chakravartin after several successful campaigns against his neighbours. In the east, he invaded Anga and Vanga (modern Bengal). In Vanga, he defeated a Chandra king, possibly Govindachandra. Later, Lakshmikarna also invaded the Pala-ruled Gauda region. His invasion was repulsed by Nayapala. The Tibetan accounts suggest that the Buddhist monk Atisha negotiated a peace treaty between the two kings. Lakshmikarna also seems to have raided Gauda during the reign of Nayapala's successor Vigrahapala III. The two kings ultimately concluded a peace treaty, with Lakshmikarna's daughter Yuvanashri marrying the Pala king.

In the south-west, Lakshmikarna fought an inconclusive war with the Kalyani Chalukya king Someshvara I. He also seems to have fought with his south-eastern neighbour, the Chola king Rajadhiraja. In the west, he defeated a Gurjara king, who can be identified with the Chaulukya king Bhima I.

In the mid-1050s, Lakshmikarna and Bhima allied against the Paramara king Bhoja. The two attacked the Paramara kingdom of Malwa simultaneously from opposite directions. According to the 14th century chronicler Merutunga, Bhoja died just as the two kings attacked Malwa. Lakshmikarna seized the Paramara kingdom, prompting Bhima to launch an expedition to recover his share of the war spoils. Within a short time, Lakshmikarna lost the control of Malwa to Bhoja's successor Jayasimha, who received help from the Kalyani Chalukya prince Vikramaditya VI Subsequently, Karna allied with Vikramaditya's rival and brother Someshvara II, and again invaded Malwa. However, the two were forced to retreat by Bhoja's brother Udayaditya.

Lakshmikarna also subjugated the Chandela king Devavarman (r. c. 1050-1060 CE), who seems to have died in a battle against him. He seems to have retained control of a large part of the Chandela territory for over a decade, before being ousted by Devavarman's successor Kirttivarman in the 1070s CE.

=== Decline ===
Main South Asian polities in 1175, on the eve of the Ghurid Empire invasion of the subcontinent.

Lakshmikarna's son Yashahkarna (r. c. 1073-1123 CE) raided some neighbouring territories, but lost the northern parts of his kingdom, including Varanasi, to the Gahadavalas. He also suffered defeats against the Paramara king Lakshmadeva and the Chandela king Sallakshanavarman.

Yashahkarna's son Gayakarna married a granddaughter of the Paramara king Udayaditya, which led to peace between the two kingdoms. However, he seems to have suffered reverses against the Chandela king Madanavarman. The Kalachuris of Ratnapura, who had earlier served as vassals of the Tripuri Kalachuris, declared their independence during Gayakarna's reign. Gayakarna unsuccessfully tried to reduce them to submission.

Gayakarna's son Narasimha recovered the territories lost to Madanavarman. Narasimha seems to have died heirless, as he was succeeded by his brother Jayasimha. Jayasimha suffered a defeat against the Chandela king Paramardi. He also sent an unsuccessful expedition against the Ratnapura Kalachuris to reduce them to submission.

During the reign of Jayasimha's successor Vijayasimha, a northern feudatory named Sallakshana unsuccessfully tried to overthrow the Kalachuri suzerainty. Vijayasimha's successor Trailokyamalla is known to have ruled at least until 1212 CE. He claimed the title "Lord of Kanyakubja", but in absence of any corroborative evidence, it cannot be said with certainty if he actually captured Kanyakubja.

Trailokyamalla is the last known king of his dynasty. It is not known when and how his rule ended. It is known that in the later half of the 13th century, the former Kalachuri territories came under the control of the Paramaras, Chandelas, the Delhi Sultanate and the Seunas (Yadavas of Devagiri).

== Religion ==
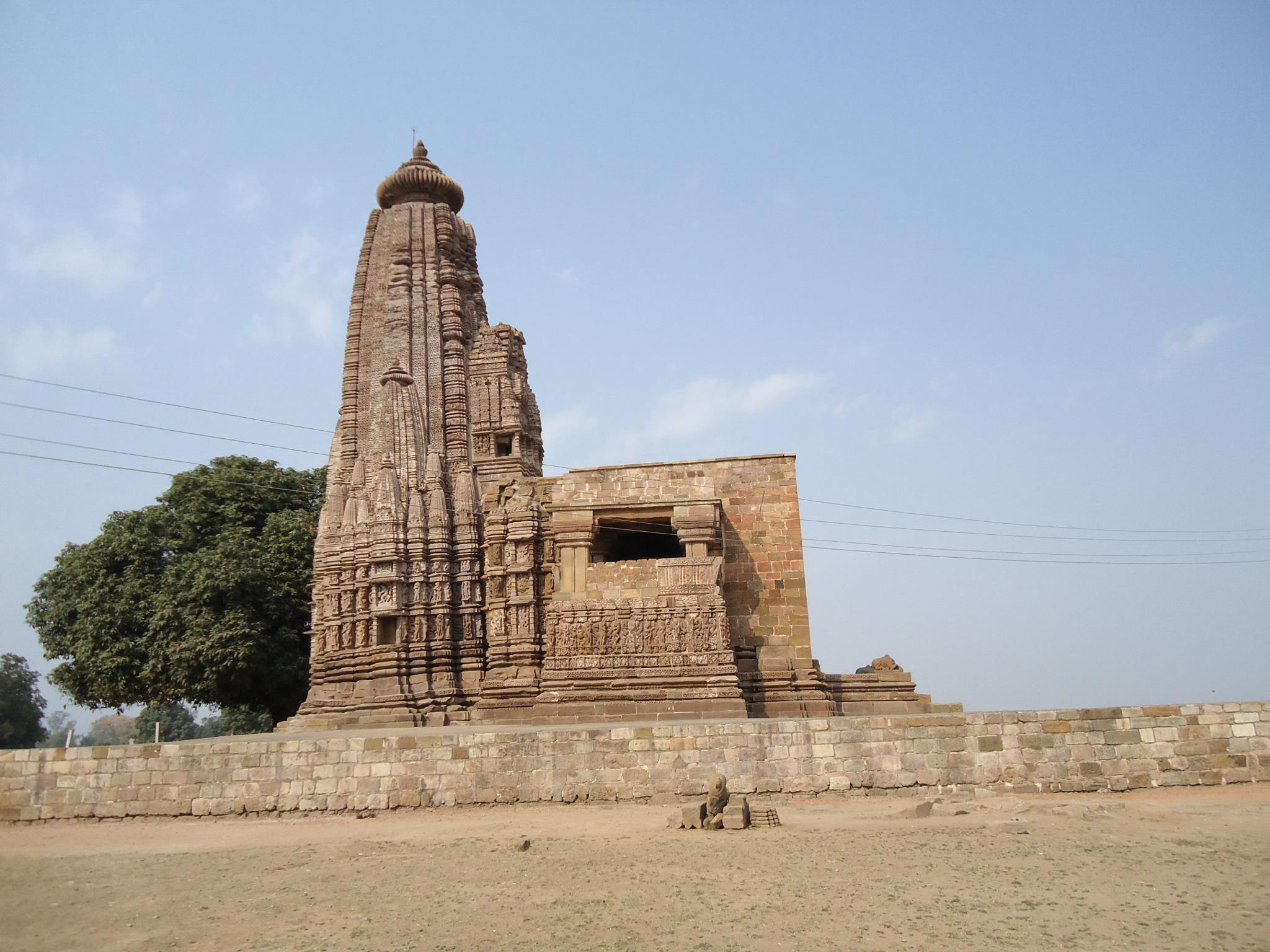
Virateshwar temple at Sohagpur, built during the Kalachuri reign

Shaivism is the predominant faith referred to in the Tripuri Kalachuri inscriptions. Several Shaiva leaders (acharya) served as royal preceptors (rajaguru) to Kalachuri kings; these included Purusha-shiva (to Yashahkarna), Shakti-shiva (to Gayakarna), Kirti-shiva (to Narasimha), and Vimala-shiva (to Jayasimha). Gangeyadeva installed a Shivalinga at Piawan, and his son Lakshmikarna built the Karna-meru temple at Varanasi, which was probably dedicated to Shiva. Yashahkarna is said to have worshipped at the Shiva temple in Draksharama during an invasion of the Andhra region. The patronage of Gayakarna's queen Alhanadevi led to the rise of Pashupata Shaivite religious leaders in the Kalachuri kingdom.

The Gyaraspur inscription of Kokalla I's son Valleka, which records the foundation of a Jain temple by the prince, prominently features Shaivite imagery and wording, with Vaishnavite overtones. Since this inscription is the only Jain-affiliated record of the dynasty, it is not clear if such syncretistic tendency was a feature of Jainism practised in the Kalachuri territory, or if the inscription is a one-off case. The temple mentioned in the inscription may be the present-day Maladevi temple, which features a mixture of Jain and Brahmanical iconography.

== List of rulers ==
Find spots of the inscriptions issued during the Tripuri Kalachuri reign (blue) and their Ratnapura vassals (gray)

The following is a list of the Tripuri Kalachuri rulers, with estimates of their reigns:

- Vamaraja-deva (675-700 CE)
- Shankara-gana I (750-775 CE)
- Lakshmana-raja I (825-850 CE)
  - Voppa-raja, described as Kokalla's predecessor in the Gyaraspur inscription, was either a son of Lakshmana-raja I, or another name for that king
- Kokalla I (850-890 CE); his younger son established the Ratnapura Kalachuri branch
- Shankara-gana II (890-910 CE), alias Mugdhatunga
- Balaharsha (910-915 CE)
- Yuvaraja-deva I (915-945 CE), alias Keyuravarsha
- Lakshmana-raja II (945-970 CE)
- Shankaragana III (970-80 CE)
- Yuvaraja-deva II (980-990 CE)
- Kokalla II (990-1015 CE)
- Gangeya-deva (1015-1041 CE)
- Lakshmi-karna (1041-1073 CE), alias Karna
- Yashah-karna (1073-1123 CE)
- Gaya-karna (1123-1153 CE)
- Nara-simha (1153-1163 CE)
- Jaya-simha (1163-1188 CE)
- Vijaya-simha (1188-1210 CE)
- Trailokya-malla (c. 1210- at least 1212 CE)
