= Udaypur, Madhya Pradesh =

Udaypur
- town
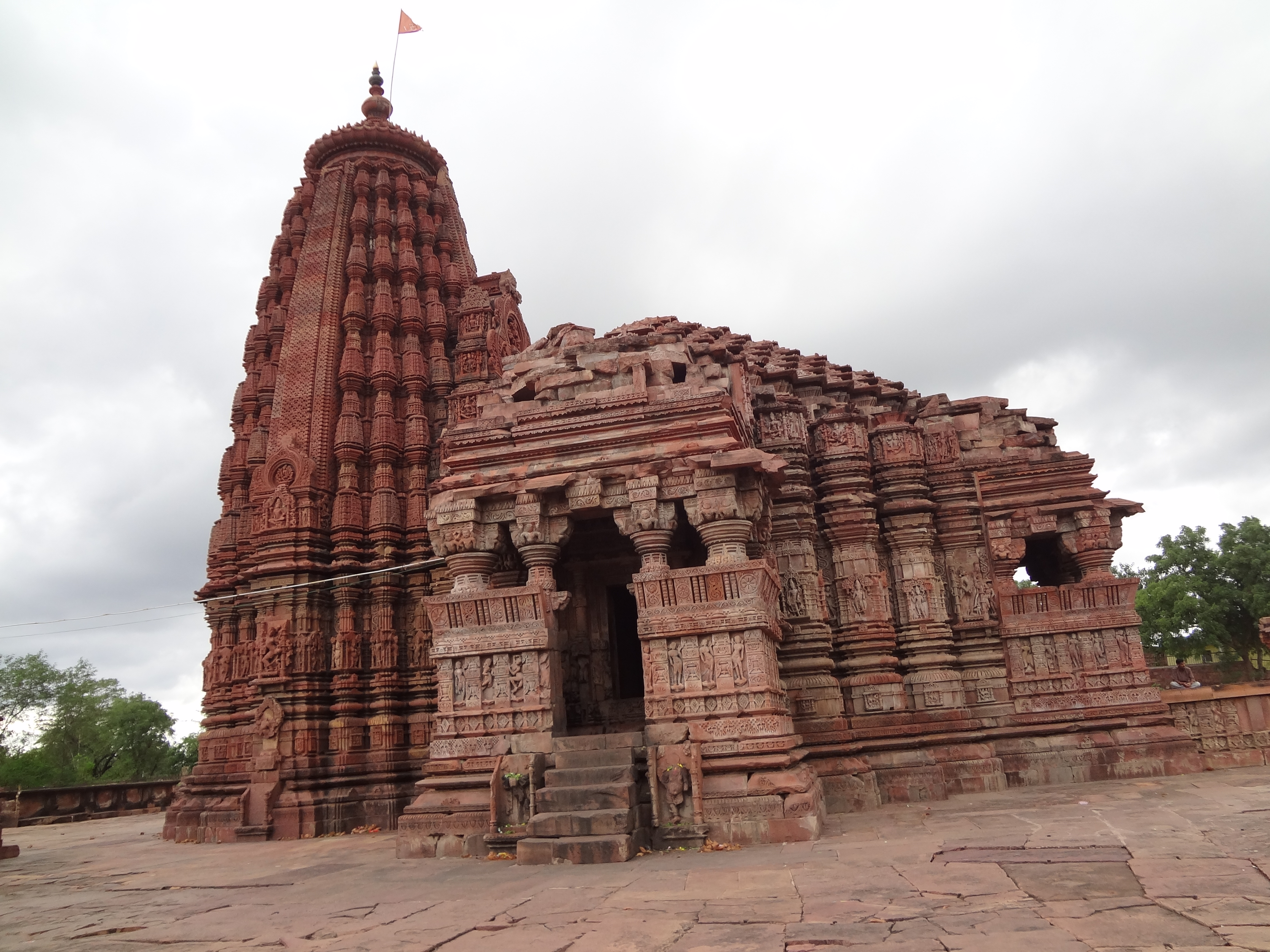
- Udayeshwar Temple

- Location in Madhya Pradesh, India
- Coordinates: 23.900177°N 78.056655°E
- Country: India
- State: Madhya Pradesh
- District: Vidisha

Languages
  - Official: Hindi
- Time zone: UTC+5:30 (IST)
- PIN: 464221
- Telephone code: 91-7594
- Vehicle registration: MP-40

Udaypur (sometimes Udaipur) is a town in Vidisha district of the Indian state of Madhya Pradesh, near Vidisha city. It is the site of a well-preserved Śiva temple, a monument of national importance protected by the Archaeological Survey of India.

== History ==
Udaypur's history reaches back to at least the ninth century, but it became famous and appears to have assumed its present name under the Paramāra king Udayāditya (c. 1060-87). It continued to be important in the 14th, 15th and 16th centuries, and was an important town on the north-south trade route.

== Geography ==
Udaypur is located at 23°54'2"N 78°3'29"E.

== Transport ==
Udaypur is connected by bus service from Ganj Basoda railway station 93 km from Bhopal Junction towards Jhansi (203 km) and 604 km from New Delhi Jn.

== Monuments ==
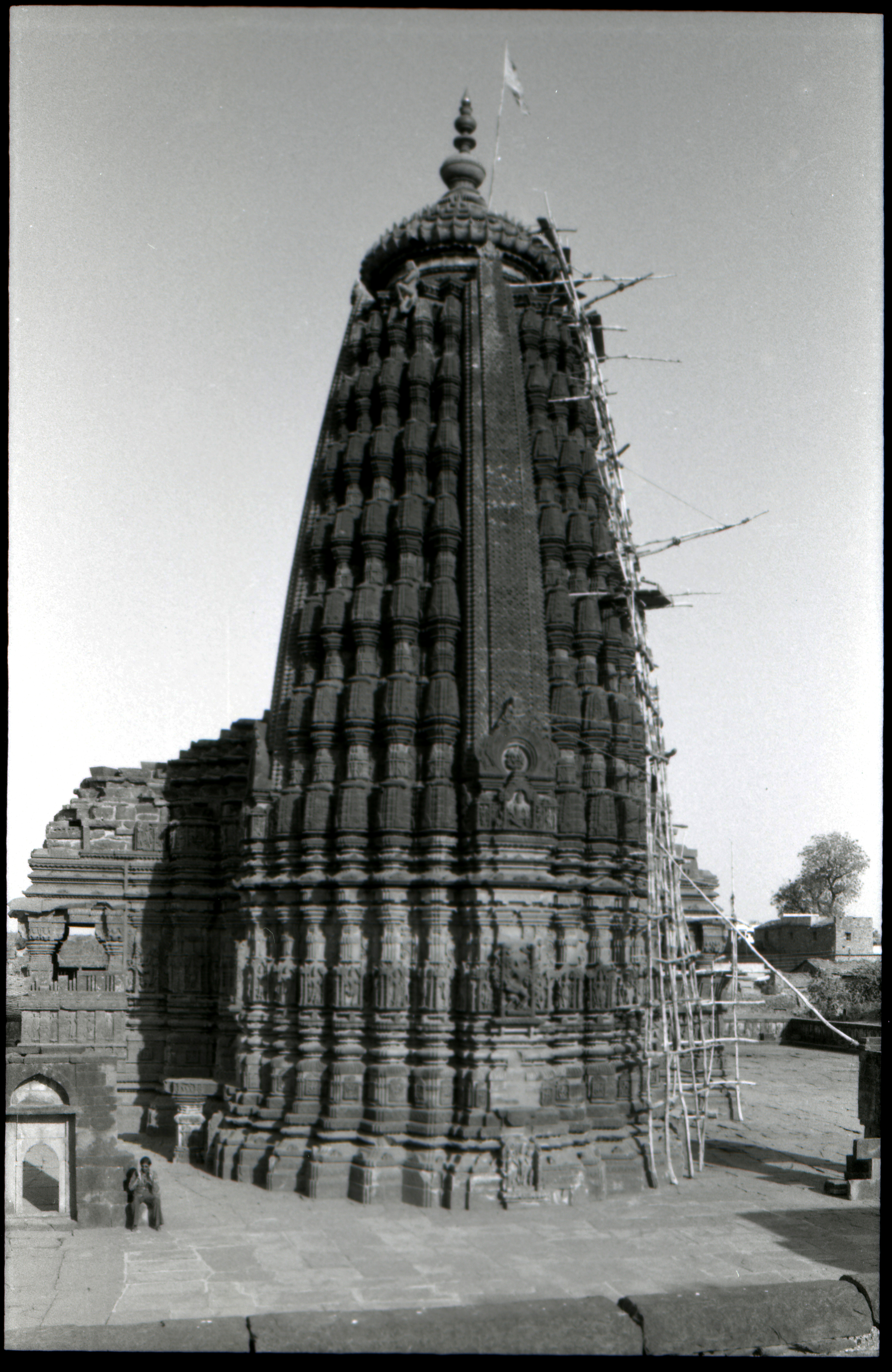
Udaypur, Madhya Pradesh. Śiva temple from the west.

The monuments of Udaypur were first studied by M. B. Garde and published in the reports of the archaeological department of Gwalior state. The data in these reports was compiled into a list prepared in 1952.

=== Śiva temple ===
The most important temple at Udaypur is that dedicated to Śiva and known today as the Nīlakaṇṭheśvara. The temple is a Monument of National Importance under the Archaeological Survey of India, number N-MP-289. The temple was completed in 1080 CE, and is the only surviving royal temple of the Paramara kings.

=== Tughluq Shahi Mosque ===
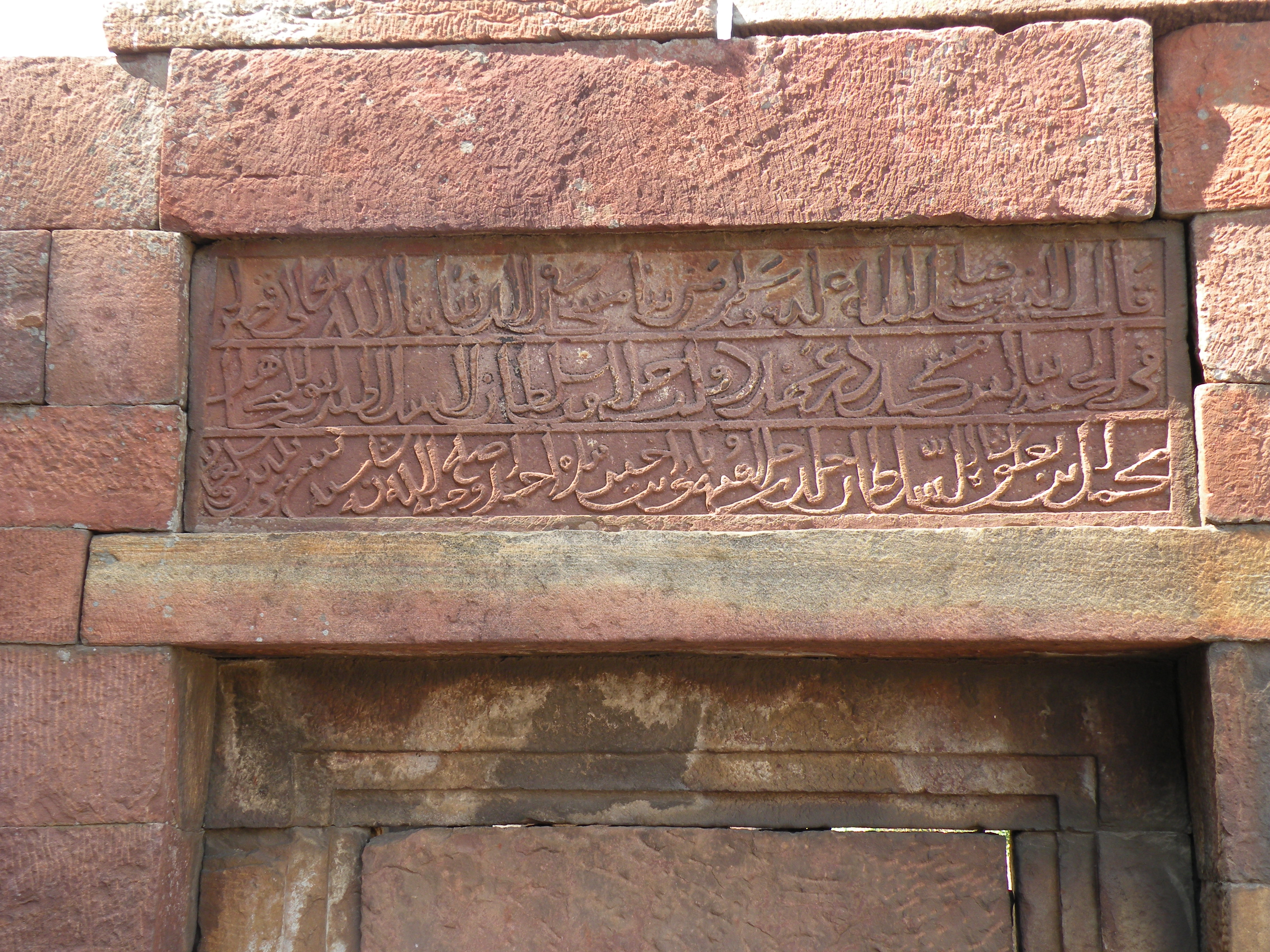
Udaypur, Madhya Pradesh. One of a pair of mosque inscriptions from the time of Muhammad ibn Tughluq, dated 739 AH (1338/1339 CE).

Directly next to the temple is a small mosque constructed during the reign of Muhammad ibn Tughluq. A pair of inscriptions record the building of this structure in 739 AH (1338/1339 CE).

=== Jain temple ===
A short distance to the north-west of the Nīlakaṇṭheśvara is a Jain temple complex. The temple proper is recent and the adjacent arcades of the courtyard belong to 19th century. A number of Jain images of the Paramāra period are on display there and document the presence of the Digambara Jain community at Udaypur in medieval times. The adjacent buildings, perhaps of the 17th century, were underdemolition in 2016.

=== Islam Shah Suri mosque ===
A short distance to the south of the Shiva temple is a mosque with an inscription recording its construction in the time of Islam Shah of the Sur Dynasty in 1549. The inscription is placed directly over the mihrab. The shows the continued importance of Udaypur on the north-south route to the Deccan in the time of the Suri rulers.

=== Shahi Mahal ===
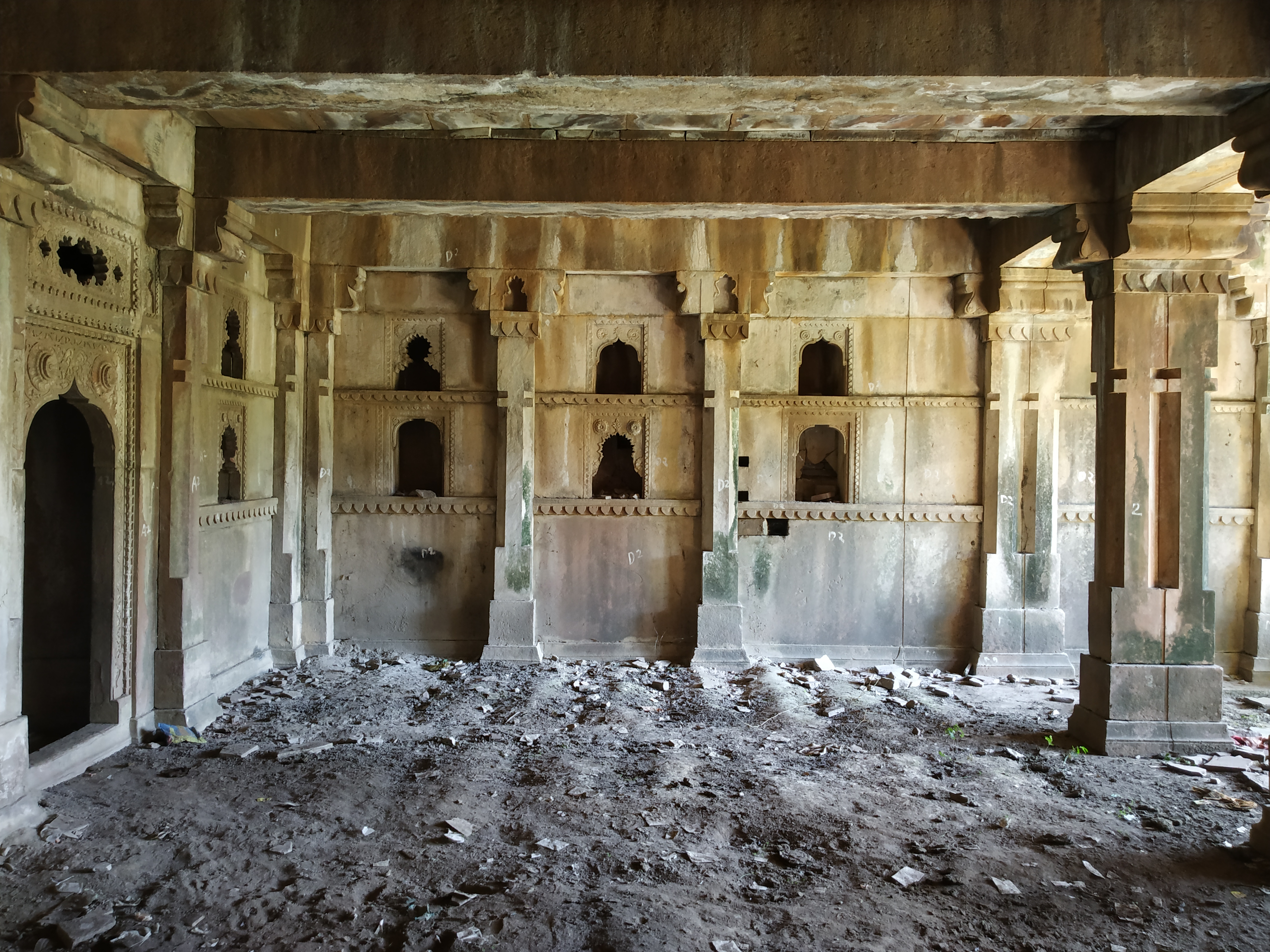
Udaypur, Shahi Mahal, interior decoration with cusped arch niches typical of Mughal architecture

Directly east of Nīlakaṇṭheśvara is a large palace complex known as Shāhī Maḥal, which served as the residence of the local governor during the Mughal rule, completed in c. 1617–32 CE.
