= Tewar, Madhya Pradesh =

Tewar Tripuri
- village
- Location within Madhya Pradesh
- Coordinates: 23.1430°N 79.8465°E
- Country: India
- State: Madhya Pradesh
- District: Jabalpur
- Block: Jabalpur
- Elevation: 388 m (1,273 ft)
- Time zone: UTC+5:30 (IST)
- Postal Index Number: 483053
- ISO 3166 code: MP-IN

Tewar is a village in the Jabalpur district of Madhya Pradesh, India. It is the site of Tripuri, an ancient city-state, and the capital of the later Kalachuris during the 8th–13th centuries.

== Etymology ==
Tewar was originally known as "Tripuri" (literally, "three cities"), a Sanskrit-language name that occurs in ancient literature and inscriptions, sometimes with the variation "Tripura". "Tirpuri", the Prakrit form of the name, can be found on copper coins dated to the 2nd century BCE or earlier. The 11th-century Iranian scholar Al-Biruni mentions the town as "Tiori". The modern name of the town may be derived from "Tiura", a corruption of "Tripura".

According to the Puranic legends, the name of the town derives from the three forts built by the three demons, collectively known as Tripurasura.

== History ==
The town of Tripuri may have been settled since the late Chalcolithic period. During 1951–52, a Sagar University team led by M G Dixit conducted excavations at Tewar, and found remnants of the black and red ware culture, along with microliths. During 1966–67, further excavations were conducted by a team comprising members from Sagar, Pune and Vadodara universities. The excavation was financed by the Madhya Pradesh government, and led by H. D. Sankalia. The Pune and Vadodara teams later withdrew, but the Sagar University continued the excavations until 1971, under the leadership of K. D. Bajpai. These excavations revealed sherds of Chalcolithic pottery, but could not firmly confirm the evidence of a Chalcolithic settlement at the site.

Several coins with the legend "Tripuri" have been discovered from Tewar. John Allan, the editor of Catalogue of Indian Coins in the British Museum, assigned these coins to late 3rd century BCE or early 2nd century BCE; other scholars have dated these coins to the later half of the 3rd century BCE. These coins appear to have been issued by the city-state of Tripuri. The people of Tripuri were known as Traipuras, and the town served as the capital of the ancient Chedi Kingdom.

The excavations at Tewar have also yielded lead coins issued by the rulers Bhavadatta, Ajadatta, and Abhayadatta; these coins are dated to the late 2nd century BCE or early 1st century BCE. Between the 2nd century BCE and 1st century CE, the region appears to have been ruled by the Datta and the Mitra dynasties: a Mitra dynasty coin has also been discovered here. Coins of several Satavahana kings have been discovered at the site, indicating that they ruled the region subsequently. From the post-Satavahana period, the excavations have revealed baked clay sealings and coins of the Bodhi dynasty, whose rule is dated to the 2nd and the 3rd centuries. The coins and seals were issued by the kings Shiva Bodhi, Vasu Bodhi, and Chandra Bodhi.

Tripuri became the capital of the Kalachuri-ruled Dahala-mandala kingdom in the 8th century. It remained an important town until the dynasty's end in the 13th century. In the 13th century, the area came under the control of the Gond.

== Demographics ==
According to the 2011 Census of India, the Tewar village has 724 households, with a population of 3,468.
