= List of people from Madhya Pradesh =

This is a list of famous and notable people from Madhya Pradesh, India. This would include persons who are known to a large number of people and is based on the extent of their popularity. Their fame could be brief, what matters is that they were well known during the peak of their popularity.

== Rulers and Generals ==
=== Ancient ===
- Yashodharman, (Gupta script: Ya-śo-dha-rmma, IAST: Yaśodharman) (r. 515 – 545) was a ruler of Malwa, in Central India, during the early part of the 6th century. He probably belonged to the Second Aulikara dynasty. He conquered much of the Indian subcontinent between c. 530-540 AD according to Mandsaur pillar inscription.
- Devi (wife of Ashoka) was, according to the Sri Lankan chronicles, the first wife of the third Mauryan Emperor Ashoka The Great. She was also the mother of Ashoka's first two children—his son, Mahendra, and daughter, Sanghamitra—both of whom played important roles in the spread of Buddhism to other countries. She is also remembered for the Sanchi Stupa.

=== Medieval ===
- Nagabhata I, (r. c. 730 – 760 CE) was the founder of the imperial Gurjara Pratihara dynasty in northern India. He ruled the Avanti (or Malava) region in present-day Madhya Pradesh, from his capital at Ujjain. He may have extended his control over Gurjaradesa, which includes parts of present-day Gujarat and Rajasthan.
- Nagabhata II, (reign 795–833) was an Indian Emperor from Gurjara-Pratihara dynasty. He ascended the throne of Gurjara-Pratihara dynasty after his father Vatsraja.
- Mihira Bhoja, (c. 836–885 CE) or Bhoja I was a Gurjara-Pratihara emperor. He succeeded his father, Ramabhadra. Bhoja was a devotee of Vishnu and adopted the title of Ādivarāha, which is inscribed on some of his coins.. One of the outstanding political figures of India in the ninth century, he ranks with Dhruva Dharavarsha and Dharmapala as a great general and empire builder.
- Lakshmikarna, (IAST: Lakśmi-Karṇa, r. c. 1041–1073 CE), also known as Karna, was a ruler of the Kalachuri dynasty of Tripuri in central India. His kingdom was centered around the Chedi or Dahala region in present-day Madhya Pradesh.
- Hammiravarman, (IAST: Hammīravarman, c. 1288–1311 CE) was a king of the Chandela dynasty of central India. He ruled in the Jejakabhukti region (Bundelkhand in present-day Madhya Pradesh and Uttar Pradesh). During his reign, the Delhi Sultan Alauddin Khalji conquered some parts of the Chandela kingdom.
- Rahila, (IAST: Rāhila, reigned c. 885–905 CE) was a king of the Chandela dynasty of India. He ruled in the Jejakabhukti region (Bundelkhand in present-day Madhya Pradesh and Uttar Pradesh).
- Yashovarman, (IAST: Yaśovarman; reigned c. 925–950 CE), also known as Lakshavarman, was a king of the Chandela dynasty of India. He ruled in the Jejakabhukti region (Bundelkhand in present-day Madhya Pradesh and Uttar Pradesh). He practically established the Chandelas as a sovereign power, although he formally acknowledged suzerainty of the Gurjara-Pratiharas. His major military achievement was the conquest of Kalanjara (modern Kalinjar). He is also notable for having commissioned the Lakshmana Temple at Khajuraho.
- Dhanga, (r. c. 950–999 CE), also known as Dhaṇgadeva in inscriptions, was a king of the Chandela dynasty of India. He ruled in the Jejakabhukti region (Bundelkhand in present-day Madhya Pradesh). Dhanga established the sovereignty of the Chandelas, who had served as vassals to the Pratiharas until his reign. He is also notable for having commissioned magnificent temples at Khajuraho, including the Vishvanatha temple.
- Vidyadhara, (r. c. 1003–1035 CE) was a Chandela king of central India. He ruled in the Jejakabhukti region (Bundelkhand in present-day Madhya Pradesh). Vidyadhara was the successor of Ganda, and expanded the Chandela power between Chambal river in the northwest and Narmada River in south.
- Madanavarman, (reigned c. 1128–1165 CE) was a king of the Chandela dynasty of India. He succeeded his father Prithvi-Varman as the ruler of the Jejakabhukti region (Bundelkhand in present-day Madhya Pradesh and Uttar Pradesh). He revived the Chandela glory by subduing the neighbouring kingdoms, and commissioned several tanks and temples.
- Bhoja, (reigned c. 1010–1055 CE) was an Indian king from the Paramara dynasty. His kingdom was centered around the Malwa region in central India, where his capital Dhara-nagara (modern Dhar) was located. Bhoja fought wars with nearly all his neighbours in attempts to extend his kingdom, with varying degrees of success. At its zenith, his empire extended from Chittor in the north to upper Konkan in the south, and from the Sabarmati River in the west to Vidisha in the east.
- Devapala, (reigned c. 1218–1239 CE) was an Indian king from the Paramara dynasty, who ruled in the Malwa region of central India.
- Mahalakadeva, (died 1305 CE), also known as Mahlak Deo or Mahlak Deva, was a king of the Paramara dynasty in central India. The last known ruler of the dynasty, he was defeated and killed by the forces of Alauddin Khalji of Delhi.

=== Modern Day ===
- Vijaya Raje Scindia (12 October 1919 – 25 January 2001), born Lekha Divyeshwari Devi in Nepal and known popularly as the Rajmata of Gwalior in India, was a prominent Indian political personality. In the days of the British Raj, as consort of the last ruling Maharaja of Gwalior, Jivajirao Scindia, she ranked among the highest royal figures of the land. In later life, she became a politician of considerable influence and was elected repeatedly to both houses of the Indian parliament. She was one of the founding members of the Bharatiya Jana Sangh.
- Sydney Greve (9 September 1915 - 7 December 2015) born Indore, known by the media as "KO KID" or "KILLER", Greve was a prominent Anglo-Indian two-time Olympic boxer representing in the 1948 Olympics and the 1952 Olympics, additionally, he was also the flyweight champion of India from 1943 to 1945, then he was the Bantamweight Champion of India from 1946 to 1947, shortly after the Great Partition of 1947, Greve moved to Pakistan where in the same year, had won the Golden Gloves Tournament of Karachi. The next year, he won the title as flyweight champion of Pakistan.

== Freedom fighters ==
- Chandra Shekhar Azad, ( 23 July 1906 – 27 February 1931), popularly known as Chandra Shekhar Azad, was an Indian revolutionary who reorganised the Hindustan Republican Association (HRA) under its new name of Hindustan Socialist Republican Association (HSRA) after the death of its founder, Ram Prasad Bismil, and three other prominent party leaders, Roshan Singh, Rajendra Nath Lahiri and Ashfaqulla Khan. He hailed from Bardarka village in Unnao district of United Provinces and his parents were Sitaram Tiwari and Jagrani Devi. He often used the pseudonym "Balraj" while signing pamphlets issued as the commander-in-chief of the HSRA.
- Ravishankar Shukla, (2 August 1877 — 31 December 1956) was a leader of the Indian National Congress, Indian independence movement activist, the Premier of the Central Provinces and Berar from 27 April 1946 to 25 January 1950, first Chief Minister of the reorganised Madhya Pradesh state from 1 November 1956 until his death on 31 December 1956, he was elected from Saraipali in Madhya Pradesh (now in Chhattisgarh). He also served as Member of Constituent Assembly of India from Central Provinces and Berar.
- Tatya Tope
- Rani Lakshmi Bai, born Manikarnika Tambe; 19 November 1828 — 18 June 1858), was the Maharani consort of the princely state of Jhansi in Maratha Empire from 1843 to 1853 by marriage to Maharaja Gangadhar Rao Newalkar. She was one of the leading figures in the Indian Rebellion of 1857, who became a national hero and symbol of resistance to the British rule in India for Indian nationalists.
- Tantya Bheel (Tantya Mama), (or Tantya Bheel, Tantya Mama; 26 January 1842 – 4 December 1889) was a freedom fighter active in India between 1878 and 1889. He is described very negatively as a criminal in the British-era accounts, but is recognized by Indians as a heroic figure. Accounts of both eras have described him as an "Indian Robin Hood".
- Jhalkari Bai
- Rani Avanti Bai (16 August 1831 – 20 March 1858) was an Indian queen-ruler and freedom fighter. She was the queen of the Ramgarh (present-day Dindori) in Madhya Pradesh. An opponent of the British East India Company during the Indian Rebellion of 1857, information concerning her is sparse and mostly comes from folklore. In 21st century, she has been used as an icon in Lodhi politics as she comes from Lodhi Rajput community.
- Thakur Ranmat Singh Baghel, legendary freedom fighter and 1857 revolt leader of Baghelkhand.
- Thakur Shyam Shah Baghel, legendary freedom fighter and 1857 revolt leader of Baghelkhand and uncle of freedom fighter Thakur Ranmat Singh Baghel.

== Military ==
=== Airforce ===
- Air Chief Marshal Shashindra Pal Tyagi, more commonly known as S P Tyagi, is an Indian Air Force officer who served as the 20th Chief of Air Staff of the Indian Air Force and served from 31 December 2004 to 31 March 2007. He was succeeded by Air Chief Marshal Fali Homi Major.
- Squadron Leader Avani Chaturvedi (born 27 October 1993) is an Indian pilot from Rewa district, Madhya Pradesh. She was declared as the first female combat pilot in India along with two of her cohorts, Mohana Singh Jitarwal, and Bhawana Kanth.

== Scientists ==
- Raj Chandra Bose (or Basu) (19 June 1901 – 31 October 1987) was an Indian American mathematician and statistician best known for his work in design theory, finite geometry and the theory of error-correcting codes in which the class of BCH codes is partly named after him.
- Narendra Karmarkar, Gwalior, mathematician. Karmarkar developed Karmarkar's algorithm.
- Anil Kakodkar, Barwani, FNA, nuclear physicist and mechanical engineer
- Siddhartha Paul Tiwari FRAS, academic, technologist and researcher.
- D. D. Bhawalkar
- Shiv Prasad Kosta
- Usha Kulshreshtha
- Sudhir Kumar Mishra
- Sangita Mukhopadhyay
- Manmohan Parida
- Vijay Kumar Patodi
- Waman Dattatreya Patwardhan
- J. S. Rajput
- C. K. Raju
- N. J. Rao
- R. Sankararamakrishnan
- V. K. Saraswat
- Sharadchandra Shankar Shrikhande
- Ajay K. Sood
- Har Swarup
- Umesh Varshney
- V. S. Wakankar
- Leela Dube
- Usha Kulshreshtha
- Shalini Moghe
- Mrunalini Devi Puar
- Bhakti Yadav

== Business ==
- Ramesh Chandra Agarwal, (30 November 1944 – 12 April 2017) was an Indian media proprietor and founder-chairman of the Dainik Bhaskar group of newspapers that has a presence in 14 states of India with 62 editions and has an estimated readership of over 15 million. He started Dainik Bhaskar newspaper at Bhopal in 1958. In 1983 he launched the Indore edition and in 1996 it was produced in Rajasthan. He was on the board of D.B. Corp Limited from its inception.
- Sir Seth Hukumchand (or Hukamchand) of Indore, Holkar State (1874–1959) was an Indian industrialist and a prominent leader of the Jain community for about 50 years.
- Ganesh Ayyar
- Ruda Ladha Chawra
- Kailash Chandra Gahtori
- Ramnath Goenka
- Dara Nusserwanji Khurody
- Ravina Raj Kohli
- Rajendra Singh Pawar
- Kanika Tekriwal

== Nobel Laureates ==
- Kailash Satyarthi

== Craftspeople ==
- Abdul Kadar Khatri (1961–2019) Master Craftsman
- Mohammed Yusuf Khatri

== Educators ==
- Frank Anthony
- Daya Bai
- Janaki Devi Bajaj
- Anil Bordia
- Annapurna Devi
- Leela Dube
- Shehla Masood
- Shalini Moghe
- Sumati Mutatkar
- Mrunalini Devi Puar
- Vijayalaxmi Sadho
- Vidya Shah
- Nirmala Srivastava
- Shah Jahan Begum of Bhopal
- B. P. Tiwari
- Siddhartha Paul Tiwari
- Kanta Tyagi
- Raj Jain (born 17 August 1951) is a professor of computer science and engineering in the Washington University School of Engineering and Applied Science at Washington University in St. Louis, Missouri.

== Sport medal Winners ==
- Sydney Greve
- Sita Sahu
- Varsha Varman
- Aditya Joshi
- Satendra Singh Lohiya

== Medicine and Doctors ==
- Hakim Syed Zillur Rahman, Bhopal born scholar of Unani medicine
- Keshavrao Krishnarao Datey cardiologist
- Vipin Buckshey
- Dipshikha Chakravortty
- M. G. Deo
- Laxmi Chand Gupta
- Hakim Syed Karam Husain
- J. S. Mahashabde
- G. N. Malviya
- B.G. Matapurkar
- Gaya Prasad Pal
- M. N. Passey
- Mrunalini Devi Puar
- Hakim Syed Zillur Rahman
- Rajendra Prakash Singh
- Amit Sood
- Shashi Wadhwa
- Bhakti Yadav

== Chief Justices of India ==
- J.S.Verma, (18 January 1933 – 22 April 2013) was an Indian jurist who served as the 27th Chief Justice of India from 25 March 1997 to 18 January 1998. He was the chairman of the National Human Rights Commission from 1999 to 2003, and chairman of the Justice Verma Committee Report on Amendments to Criminal Law after the 2012 Delhi gang rape case. He remains one of India's most highly regarded Chief Justices and eminent jurists in its history.
- Ramesh Chandra Lahoti, (1 November 1940 – 23 March 2022) was the 35th Chief Justice of India, serving from 1 June 2004 to 1 November 2005.

== Judge ==
- Jitendra Kumar Maheshwari (born 29 June 1961) is a judge of the Supreme Court of India. He is former chief justice of the Sikkim High Court. Before that, he served as chief justice of the Andhra Pradesh High Court and judge of Madhya Pradesh High Court. He was born in Joura, Madhya Pradesh. He was a practicing lawyer in Gwalior before he got elevated to the bench.

== Governor of RBI ==
- Raghuram Rajan, (born 3 February 1963) is an Indian economist and the Katherine Dusak Miller Distinguished Service Professor of Finance at the University of Chicago's Booth School of Business. Between 2003 and 2006 he was Chief Economist and director of research at the International Monetary Fund. From September 2013 through September 2016 he was the 23rd Governor of the Reserve Bank of India. In 2015, during his tenure at the RBI, he became the Vice-Chairman of the Bank for International Settlements.

== Hindi and Urdu literature ==
- Pandit Makhanlal Chaturvedi (4 April 1889 – 30 January 1968), also called Pandit ji, was an Indian poet, writer, essayist, playwright and a journalist who is particularly remembered for his participation in India's national struggle for independence and his contribution to Chhayavaad, the Neo-romanticism movement of Hindi literature.
- Nathuram Premi
- Ramkumar Verma
- Gajanan Madhav Muktibodh
- Harishankar Parsai
- Sharad Joshi
- Rahat Indori
- Rajneesh
- Bihari Lal
- Abdul Qavi Desnavi
- Rahat Indori
- Kaif Bhopali
- Uday Prakash
- Seth Govind Das
- Hari Krishna Devsare
- Nida Fazli
- Anupam Mishra
- Balachandra Shastri
- Vidya Shah
- Mrinal Pande
- Vagish Shastri
- Khurram Murad
- Bhagwan Datt Sharma

== Sports ==
- Master Chief Petty Officer Omkar Singh (Hindi: ओमकार सिंह, born 8 August 1984) is an Indian sports shooter. He won three gold medals and a silver medal in shooting events at the 2010 Commonwealth Games held in Delhi. He hails from Anuppur district of Madhya Pradesh and is currently serving the Indian Navy.
- Paan Singh Tomar (1 January 1932 — 1 October 1981) was an Indian soldier, athlete, and later, Baaghi (rebel/outlaw).

== Activists ==
- Ashif Shaikh (born 18 October 1982) is a social activist from India who has worked for ending sexual violence against women and children, eradication of manual scavenging, forced labour practices and human trafficking in India. He is the founder of Rashtriya Garima Abhiyan (National Campaign for Dignity) and the non profit organisation, Jan Sahas.
- Alok Agarwal
- B. R. Ambedkar
- Mabelle Arole
- Daya Bai
- Rashida Bee
- Rajeev John George
- Abdul Jabbar Khan
- Harsh Mander
- Vishal Mangalwadi
- Shehla Masood
- Lilatai Pradkar
- Anand Rai
- Satinath Sarangi
- Kailash Satyarthi
- Vidya Shah
- Champa Devi Shukla
- Aditya Tiwari
- Sunil Verma

== Journalists ==
- Makhanlal Chaturvedi
- Nathuram Premi
- Mrinal Pande
- Prabhash Joshi
- Deepak Chaurasia

== Actors ==
=== Male ===
- Raj Arjun is an Indian actor who mainly works in Hindi cinema. He has also worked in Tamil, Malayalam and Telugu cinema. He is the recipient of Zee Cine Awards for Best Actor In A Negative Role and Indian Television Academy Awards for Best Actor.
- Vivian Dsena
- Ami Mishra
- Anil Mange
- Arjun Rampal
- Arunoday Singh
- Ashok Kumar
- Javed Khan
- Johnny Walker
- Salim Khan
- Salman Khan
- Praveen Morchhale
- Sharat Saxena
- Kumar Pallana
- Raghuvir Yadav
- Swanand Kirkire
- Govind Namdev
- Ashutosh Rana
- Mukesh Tiwari
- Shaan
- Sharad Kelkar
- Annu Kapoor
- Rajeev Verma
- Mushtaq Khan
- Razak Khan
- Sachin Nayak
- Rishiking
- Kartik Aaryan
- Sunil Lahri

=== Female ===
- Divyanka Tripathi
- Isha Malviya
- Paridhi Sharma
- Lata Mangeshkar
- Jaya Bachchan
- Ananya Khare
- Palak Muchhal
- Aishwarya Khare
- Kritika Kamra
- Mamta Sharma
- Sara Khan
- Himangini Singh Yadu
- Neha Hinge

== Directors ==
- Vivek Agnihotri
- Sanjay Puran Singh Chauhan
- Deepshikha Nagpal
- Akhilesh Jaiswal
- Baburao Patel
- Rishiking
- Alok Shrivastava
- Aparnaa Singh
- Chandrakant Singh
- Nitesh Tiwari
- Leena Yadav

== Singers ==
- Pandit Kumar Gandharva (pronunciation:[kʊmaːɽ ɡɐndʱɐɽʋɐ], Kn: ಕುಮಾರ್ ಗಂಧರ್ವ; 8 April 1924 – 12 January 1992), originally known as Shivaputra Siddharamayya Komkalimath was an Indian classical singer, well known for his unique vocal style and for his refusal to be bound by the tradition of any gharana. The name, Kumar Gandharva, is a title given to him when he was a child prodigy; a Gandharva is a musical spirit in Hindu mythology.
- Pandit Mukul Shivputra (born 25 March 1956) (previously known as Mukul Komkalimath) is a Hindustani Classical vocalist of the Gwalior Gharana and the son and foremost disciple of Pt. Kumar Gandharva.
- Asgari Bai
- Gundecha Brothers
- Meenal Jain
- Junior Dagar Brothers
- Amir Khan (singer)
- Swanand Kirkire
- Sombala Kumar
- Pinky Maidasani
- Shashwati Mandal
- Lata Mangeshkar
- Penaz Masani
- Piyush Mishra
- Sumati Mutatkar
- Madhura Naik
- Krishnarao Shankar Pandit
- Ritu Pathak
- Kavi Pradeep
- Madhavapeddi Satyam
- Vidya Shah
- Mamta Sharma
- Jaymala Shiledar
- Vayu Shrivastav
- Kishore Kumar

== Politics ==
- B.R. Ambedkar
- Shankar Dayal Sharma, former President of India
- Atal Bihari Vajpayee, former PM of India
- Kailash Nath Katju
- Vijaya Raje Scindia
- Madhavrao Scindia, former Union Minister
- Paras Chandra Jain, Energy Minister, Government of Madhya Pradesh
- Kailash Vijayvargiya, BJP National General Secretary
- Kamal Patel, former Minister, Government of Madhya Pradesh
- Arjun Singh, politician
- Vasundhara Raje
- Sharad Yadav
- Jaya Bachchan
- Sumitra Mahajan
- Jyotiraditya Madhavrao Scindia
- Prithviraj Chavan
- Shivraj Singh Chouhan, current chief minister
- Uma Bharti
- Digvijaya Singh
- Satish Kumar Sharma, politician
- Prahlad Pandey, politician

== Hockey ==
- Roop Singh
- Ahmed Khan
- Aslam Sher Khan
- Shivendra Singh
- Shankar Laxman

== Cricket ==
- Mansoor Ali Khan Pataudi
- Mushtaq Ali
- Chandu Sarwate, former India cricketer.
- Amay Khurasiya, former India cricketer.
- Narendra Hirwani, former India cricketer.
- C. K. Nayudu
- Rajat Patidar
- Sanjay Jagdale
- Narendra Menon
- Sudhir Asnani
- Rahul Dravid, Indian cricketer born in Indore.
- Amay Khurasiya
- Jai Prakash Yadav
- Naman Ojha
- Devendra Bundela
- Nuzhat Parween
- Ishwar Pandey

== Militants ==
- Safdar Nagori

== Skiing ==
- Himanshu Thakur

== Information Technology and Research ==
- Siddhartha Paul Tiwari FRAS (born 1979) is an academic, technologist and researcher. Currently, he works with Google Asia Pacific, Singapore. Prior to this, he led Google's global learning and development efforts from Tokyo. He is known for his work in the areas of e-governance, mobile technologies, digital intervention strategies, and information and communication technologies (ICTs).
- Surya Narayan Vyas (2 March 1902 in Ujjain, India – 22 June 1976) was an Indian astrologer and diviner from Ujjain, in the Indian state of Madhya Pradesh.

== Contribution in other fields ==
- Ratnesh Pandey (born 12 May 1985) is an Indian mountaineer, who climbed Mount Everest in 2016.
- V. S. Pathak (1926–2003) was a historian, Sanskrit scholar and an Indologist who authored several books.

== See also ==
- List of people by India state
