= Bagra =

Bagra may refer to:

== Places ==
- Bagra, Kardzhali Province in Kardzhali Municipality, Bulgaria
- Bagra, Marwar, in Jalore District of Rajasthan State (India)
- Bagra, Barisal District, Bangladesh
- Bagra, Chittagong, Bangladesh
- Bagra, Dhaka, Bangladesh
- Bagra, Haripur, Pakistan
- Bagra Tawa a village in Madhya Pradesh, India (sometimes called only Bagra)

== Other uses ==
- The Bagra Army, an evil organization led by their Emperor Bagramon in Digimon Xros Wars
- Tumke Bagra, Indian politician
