= Denwa =

River in Madhya Pradesh, India

Coordinates: 22°33′N 78°00′E

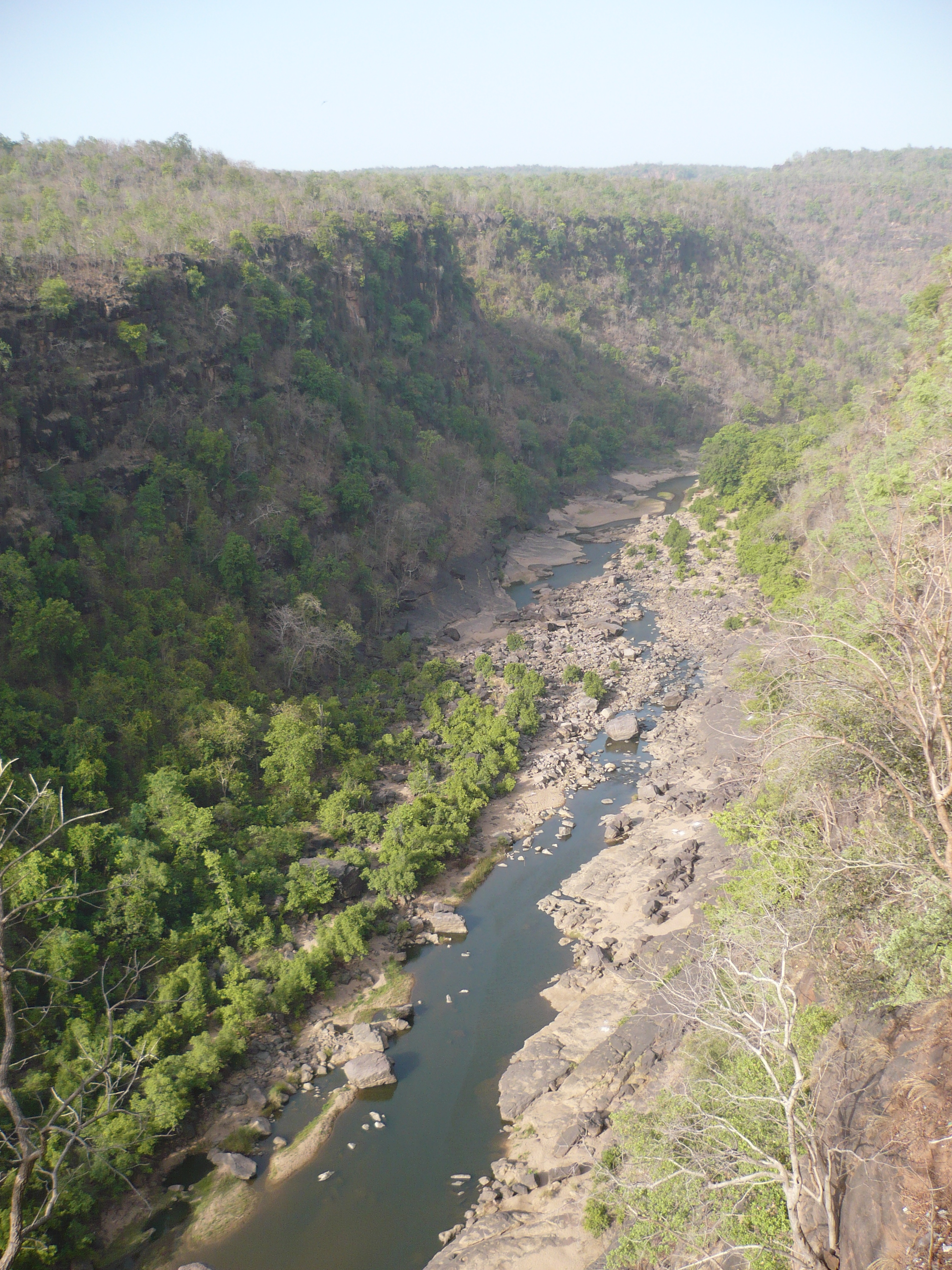
Denwa river

The Denwa is a river originating around Dhupgarh, in the Indian state of Madhya Pradesh. Denwa is a tributary of the Tawa, which is the largest tributary of Narmada River.

Among the complex of hills around Pachmarhi plateau a line of hills extends from Dhupgarh (1350 m.) to Burimal (1088 m.) located about 15 km in the south. The Denwa river rises at the Denwa Khud south of the plateau and circuits it flowing to the south, east, north and the west.

The Denwa joins the Tawa near Bagra and is an equally important stream.
