= BGTA =

BGTA may refer to:

- BGTA, the ICAO code for Tasiusaq Heliport, Greenland
- BGTA, the Indian Railways station code for Bagra Tawa railway station, Madhya Pradesh, India
