= Bagra, Barisal District =

Bagra Bagarh - باگڑھ :>
- Location in Bangladesh
- Coordinates: 22°52′N 90°9′E
- Country: Bangladesh
- Division: Barisal Division
- District: Barisal District
- Time zone: UTC+6 (Bangladesh Time)

Bagra is a village in Barisal District in the Barisal Division of southern-central Bangladesh. It is surrounded by Jugirkanda, Chakman, and the Harta River.
