= Bhagwandas Raikwar =

Indian martial artist and coach

Personal information
- Nickname: Dau
- Nationality: Indian
- Citizenship: India
- Born: January 2, 1944 Sagar, Madhya Pradesh, India
- Died: April 19, 2026 (aged 82) Bhopal, Madhya Pradesh, India
- Occupation(s): Martial artist, coach

Sport
- Country: India
- Sport: Bundeli martial arts
- Club: Chhatrasal Bundela Akhara

Bhagwandas Raikwar, also known as Dau (2 January 1944 – 19 April 2026) was an Indian practitioner and coach of traditional martial arts from Sagar, Madhya Pradesh. He served as director of the Chhatrasal Bundela Akhara in Sagar, an institution founded in 1960 to preserve the traditional Bundeli martial arts form, which involves the use of swords, staffs, and other traditional weapons. In 2026, he was awarded the Padma Shri, India’s fourth-highest civilian honour, by the Government of India.

He has represented Bundeli martial arts at international cultural events in Russia, France, Singapore, and the United States under the auspices of the Indian Council for Cultural Relations. He died on 19 April 2026.

== Career ==
He grew up within the Chhatrasal Vyayam Shala complex in Sagar, Madhya Pradesh, where Bundeli martial arts had been practised for generations. The akhara was founded in 1960 by Guru Ramcharan and is named after Maharaja Chhatrasal Bundela (1649–1731), the Bundela Rajput ruler of Bundelkhand who resisted Mughal domination. Over time, Bhagwandas became an instructor and later director of the institution, where he trained students in the discipline.

The akhara is empanelled with the Indian Council for Cultural Relations (ICCR). Through ICCR, Raikwar and his troupe performed Bundeli martial arts at international cultural events in Russia, France, Singapore, and the United States.

He also trained girls in these martial arts to empower them with self-defence skills. He had performed nearly 800 stage shows and has trained around 10,000 children in Bundeli martial art.

== Personal life ==
He was born on 2 January 1944 in Sagar. He died on 19 April 2026 at AIIMS Bhopal, where he had been undergoing treatment, at the age of 83. His last rites were performed in Sagar with state honours, where a guard of honour was accorded by the police.

== See also ==
- List of people from Madhya Pradesh
