= Prashant Pandey (activist) =

Indian activist and IT consultant

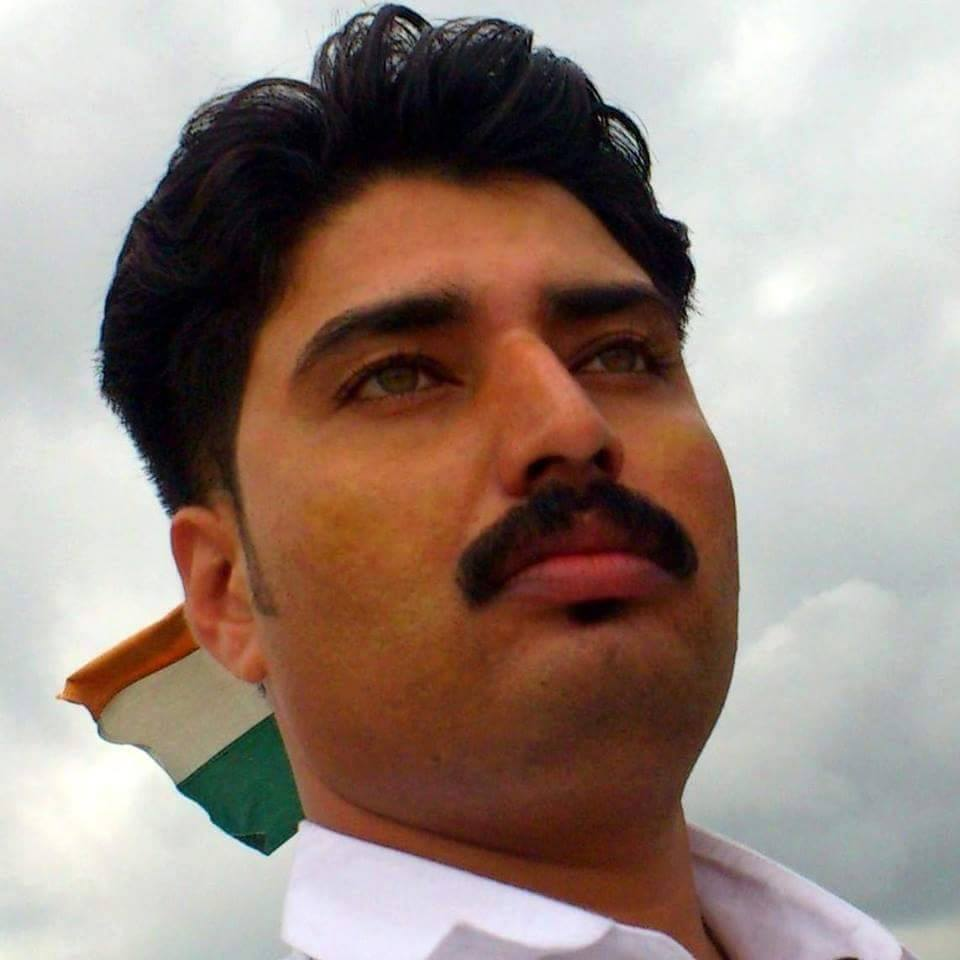
- Born: 1978 (age 47–48)
- Occupations: Activist, digital forensic engineer and consultant
- Known for: Vyapam scam

Prashant Pandey (born 1978) is an Indian activist, IT consultant and digital forensic engineer from Madhya Pradesh, known for his role in the Vyapam scam investigation.

Pandey worked as an IT consultant with the Special Task Force (STF) investigating the Vyapam scam. In 2014, he was arrested for allegedly using the records collected by the team to blackmail those accused in the scam. Pandey denied the allegations, and stated that he was being falsely implicated for trying to expose the involvement of senior state government leaders in the scam. Since then, he has alleged death threats and harassment by the police at the behest of the state government.

== Background ==
Prashant Pandey holds a Master of Computer Applications degree from the Indore University. He used to operate a web portal called policewala.com, and runs a firm called Techn07. Fascinated with the fictional spy James Bond, he traded in spying gadgets, which he also supplied to the police. He claims to have provided services to the military and several government agencies including Directorate of Revenue Intelligence, Directorate of Air Intelligence, Income Tax Department, Jammu and Kashmir Police, Chhattisgarh Police, Intelligence Bureau (since 2005), Department of Telecommunications, CID, and ATS. Besides Vyapam scam investigations, he also claims to have helped the Madhya Pradesh Police in solving cases involving "Islamist terrorists, tax evaders, kidnappings, and political murders". However, he was virtually unknown before his 2014 arrest during the Vyapam scam investigations.

== Allegations in Vyapam scam ==
=== 2014 arrest ===
In 2013, several members of the ruling Bharatiya Janata Party (BJP) were accused in the Vyapam scam in the Madhya Pradesh state of India. Prashant Pandey had been hired as an IT consultant by the Special Task Force (STF) investigating this scam. On the night of 5–6 August 2014, the STF arrested him and a telecom officer named Sonu Kumar from Hotel Raunak Plaza. The STF alleged that Pandey had been blackmailing the Vyapam accused using the call detail records (CDRs) collected by the team. The investigators accused him of obtaining information illegally using "his network in the inner circle of the police department", and of selling the CDRs.

Pandey was released on bail a few days after his arrest.

=== Allegations as a whistleblower ===
After his arrest, Pandey approached the Indian National Congress (INC) general secretary Digvijaya Singh, and claimed to be a whistleblower. He denied leaking any agency data for personal benefit, and alleged that he was being falsely implicated for wanting to expose the role of Bharatiya Janata Party (BJP) leaders in the scam. According to Pandey, the agencies had tampered with a Microsoft Excel file recovered from the computer of the Vyapam accused Nitin Mohindra. This file contained the names of high-profile people who had recommended illegal selection of candidates for the Vyapam exams. Pandey alleged that the file originally contained the names of senior BJP leaders, including the Chief Minister Shivraj Singh Chouhan. He stated that the investigators had removed these names from the file.

Pandey's version of the events is as follows: In January 2014, the policemen had seized a hard disk drive from the Vyapam scam suspect Nitin Mohindra. But they did not possess a Serial ATA cable, so they were unable to connect it to the desktop at the local police station. Pandey gave them a cable, but a policeman connected the hard disk drive to Pandey's computer in order to ensure that the cable was working. While the policeman had a cup of tea, Pandey's computer automatically made a mirror image of the drive. In March 2014, the STF paid him to install hidden cameras in their interrogation rooms in Bhopal. In June 2014, the INC released phone records alleging that the Chief Minister's wife Sadhna Singh had made 139 calls to the scam ringleaders Nitin Mohindra and Pankaj Trivedi. The police arrested him, seized his computers and interrogated him for days because they suspected that he had some information about the Chief Minister's involvement. After being released on bail, Pandey decided to expose the corrupt officials. He realized that he had a mirror image of Nitin Mohindra's hard disk drive. He compared the Excel file on this drive to the one submitted by the police to the Court. He realized that the police had tampered with the evidence to save the Chief Minister, and approached Digvijaya Singh through his lawyer.

The State Government refuted the allegations, and accused Pandey and INC of tampering with the evidence. The STF claimed that Pandey had made these allegations to protect himself from the criminal charges filed against him.

=== Court cases ===
In February 2015, on the basis of Prashant Pandey's accusations, the INC went to the Madhya Pradesh High Court alleging that the STF's investigation was based on the doctored file. Pandey was mentioned as "Mr X" in the court records to guard his identity. Meanwhile, Pandey moved to Delhi, citing threats to his life. He filed a case in the Delhi High Court, which provided him police protection.

A Special Investigation Team (SIT) appointed by the Madhya Pradesh High Court sent the original hard disk seized by the STF from Nitin Mohindra to the government forensic laboratory in Gandhinagar, which concluded that it had not been tampered with. In April 2015, the SIT told the High Court that Pandey had submitted forged documents and misled the investigations. The High Court then recommended legal action against Pandey. Pandey stood his ground, and stated that his version of the Excel sheet had been proved as authentic by Truth Labs, a private forensic lab. The INC lawyer Vivek Tankha alleged that that SIT was working under political pressure, and had dismissed Pandey's version as forged without examining it.

On 27 April 2015, the Delhi High Court prohibited the STF from arresting Pandey, and instructed the STF to interrogate him only in the presence of his legal counselor.

Ultimately, the Supreme Court assigned the Central Bureau of Investigation (CBI) to investigate the authenticity of Pandey's version of the Excel file. The CBI concluded that Pandey had submitted false information before the court, recommended closing the case and declared that it will frame charges against Pandey. In June 2017, Pandey filed an interlocutory application against the CBI. He argued that had not followed proper procedures while collecting the evidence: it had seized only the hard disk drive, but not other digital equipment. He also alleged that CBI had not investigated the people whose names had surfaced in connection with the scam.

=== Alleged harassment and threats ===
Pandey has reported receiving death threats.

On 8 May 2015, he filed a police complaint stating that some unidentified people had tried to kill him and his family in a car accident. He alleged that a truck hit a car that his wife was driving. Pandey's wife, his 4-year-old son, his father and his grandmother were in the car. Pandey was present in a vehicle following the overturned car. His grandmother was hospitalised as a result of this accident. The Indore Police stated that Pandey's allegations were false. SP Abid Khan stated that eyewitnesses had testified that the car had overturned after hitting a cow carcass, and the condition of the car did not indicate the impact of any heavy vehicle. The police also stated that Pandey had not mentioned anything about a truck when he first called the police control room after the accident. An audio clip, allegedly of Pandey's call to the police control room, went viral on WhatsApp the next day. In the audio, the caller can be heard saying that his car had overturned after being hit by a dead cow.

Pandey alleged that his life was under threat from "influential people in power", and appealed the Supreme Court seeking security cover.

After Pandey moved to Delhi citing death threats, his wife Meghna continued to live in Indore with the rest of their family. In July 2015, the Indore Police briefly detained Meghna with and seized ₹ 996,000 in cash from her. The police claimed that they had been tipped off about an illegal hawala transaction taking place at the firm, where Meghna works as an HR manager. The police apprehended her as she was coming out of the firm's office with the cash. They claimed that they seized the cash because she could not provide a satisfactory explanation about its origin. The police released her after a few hours, informing the Income Tax department about the cash. Prashant Pandey stated that the seized cash was the couple's "own hard-earned money" mentioned in their tax returns, and was to be given to a builder for booking a flat. The incident led to allegations that the State Government had been harassing Pandey and his family for his role in exposing the Vyapam scam. Inspector General of Police Vipin Maheshwari had to hold a press conference to deny these allegations.

== Phone tapping allegations ==
In May 2015, Pandey alleged that 4,000 Madhya Pradesh police personnel were using illegal telephone tapping software known as CRA-I and CRA-II. The allegations were backed by the All India Congress Committee (AICC), whose general secretary Mohan Prakash alleged that the phones in its Delhi offices had been put under surveillance in Madhya Pradesh. Pandey claimed to have learned about the phone tapping software in 2011–12, while mining data for ATS and other police agencies. He further alleged that the government agencies were making monthly payments ranging from half-a-million rupees to 5 million rupees, to a US-based company for this software.

At Pandey's request, the Supreme Court of India issued notices to Madhya Pradesh Police. DGP Surendra Sinh refuted Pandey's allegations, and stated that all recording had been done using "legal channels". However, The Free Press Journal reported that the top police officers were "trying to hush up the case" of using a private company named "Spandan Technologies" for getting unauthorised access to CDRs. These CDRs were later allegedly obtained by "industrialists, businessmen and politicians" for blackmailing their rivals.

Pandey also requested the Supreme Court to order a CBI inquiry into this matter. The petition is pending before the Court.
