= Prithvivarman =

- Parama-bhattaraka Maharajadhiraja Parameshvara

King of Jejakabhukti
- Reign: c. 1120–1128 CE
- Predecessor: Jayavarman
- Successor: Madanavarman
- Dynasty: Chandela
- Father: Kirttivarman

Prithvi-Varman (IAST: Pṛthvīvarman; reigned c. 1120–1128 CE) was a king of the Chandela dynasty of India. He succeeded his nephew Jayavarman as the ruler of the Jejakabhukti region (Bundelkhand in present-day Madhya Pradesh and Uttar Pradesh).

== Early life ==
Prithvivarman and his elder brother Sallakshanavarman were sons of the Chandela ruler Kirttivarman from the same mother, as stated in the Mau inscription. After Kirttivarman's death, Sallakshana and his son Jayavarman ruled the Chandela king. After Jayavarman abdicate the throne and retired, Prithvivarman became the new king.

== Career ==
Like his predecessors, Prithvivarman issued copper coins featuring the deity Hanuman. He is also known from the four later Chandela inscriptions:

- Augasi copper-plate inscription of Madanavarman
- Mau inscription of Madanavarman
- Ajaygarh inscription of Kalyanadevi (the wife of Viravarman)
- Ajaygarh inscription of Ganapati

These inscriptions do not mention any glorious achievements of Prithvivarman. However, this does not necessarily mean that he was a weak ruler; it is possible that he did not adopt an aggressive expansionist policy. The Mau inscription states that he handled the hereditary administration well. It also contains a conventional eulogy, describing him as someone who practiced the conduct of the "Golden age" by hating the ill-behaved persons, delighting those worthy, taking lawful wealth and spending it according to the sacred texts, and protecting all beings.

According to the Mau inscription, Prithvivarman appointed Gadadhara as his chief minister. Gadadhara had served as a pratihara (chamberlain) to the previous king Jayavarman, and his father Ananta had served as a chief minister to the Chandela kings before Prithvivarman. An Ajaygarh inscription mentions Gokula of Gauda family as another hereditary minister of Prithvivarman.

Prithvivarman is given the usual royal titles Parama-bhattaraka Maharajadhiraja Parameshvara in the Augasi inscription. The Ajaygarh inscription of Kalyanadevi compares him to the legendary king Prithu. He was succeeded by his son Madanavarman.
