= Ruda Ladha Chawra =

Indian railway contractor (1884–1948)

Seth Ruda Ladha Chawra, Rai Saheb (1884–1948) was a noted railway contractor and Kutchi industrialist, who established himself at Hoshangabad, India.

== Early life ==
He was born in 1884 to Ladha Bharmal of Chandiya at Madhapar near Bhuj in erstwhile Princely State of Cutch. He belonged to a small but enterprising Mestri community, which was known for their architectural skills. Ruda Ladha's father Ladha Bharamal and uncle Ramji Bharmal worked as a railway contractor in Itarsi – Jabalpur section in 1869–71 and also Bhopal State Railway works in 1880–81 connecting Itarsi with Bhopal.

Ruda Ladha had some primary education at vernacular school at Madhapar and Bhuj.

== Railway contractor ==
Ruda Ladha also joined his father in his business of railway contractor at a very early age and soon gained a name as reputed railway contractor for Great Indian Peninsula Railway. He was involved in laying of railway line from Pandhurna to Itarsi section in 1922 with fellow contractors from his community and worked on several other railway bridges and lines.

He was also involved in several railway contract works of Seth Walchand Hirachand with whom he shared personal friendship. Walchand, when founded Hindustan Construction Company in 1926, offered him to join him as a partner in his company, which he politely declined. He along with some other Mestri railway contractors were a part of the team that did Bhor ghat tunnelling in Kasara to Khandala section of G.I.P. Railway, which was completed by Tata Construction Company headed by Walchand during years 1926–28.

== Industrialist ==
He later founded his industry at a small village Bagra in erstwhile Central Provinces and Berar (present day Madhya Pradesh) around 1915. He was one of the early businessman to enter into the roof tile making business and only second after Sitaram Malaviya, who pioneered the industry in 1903 by establishing the first roof tile factory at Bagra under name Sitaram & Sons. Ruda Ladha started his industrial career with a factory at Bagra in 1921, which he later developed into a fully mechanised modern factory, importing machinery and dies from England. The 'Trishul' brand of tiles made by him soon earned name throughout India and he became a leading businessman in tile making business and he expanded into establishing several other tile making factories in later years.

== Miner ==
He also held some investments in a colliery at Betul near Chhindwara. Further, he also owned Manganese mines. His son Maoji Ruda, who inherited his tiles factory and Manganese mines and a noted contractor, who was involved in doubling of railway lines between Bagra Tawa and Sohagpur (23.1 km), Itarsi to Gurra (10.6 km), Madan Mahal to Bheraghat (13.1 km) (1961–62) and doubling of the Itarsi— Bhopal section between Itarsi – Powarkheda – Narmadapuram (18.1 km) (1961–62).

== Public life ==
He was nominated as a member to District Council of Narmadapuram and made an honorary magistrate III Class. He was awarded title of Rai Saheb by British in year 1929. He was also awarded Jubilee Medal of 1935 and 1937 Coronation Medal.

== Others ==
He owned large mansion at Narmadapuram and valuable landed properties at Narmadapuram, Itarsi, Bhopal and Jabalpur including major portion of agricultural lands at Bagra village. In his native village Madhapar in Kutch, also he owned a large mansion and agricultural lands.

He owned a cinema hall named 'Bharat Talkies' at Itarsi, which he built in year 1945.

== Philanthropist ==
He donated money in 1930 to open a ward, which was named after him as Ruda Ladha Ward at Friends Hospital in Itarsi. Also he was responsible for starting a primary school at Bagra Tawa and donated money for expansion of school at Narmadapuram and Itarsi and building a temple at Bagra Tawa. He had also donated money to Indian Red Cross Society.

== Death ==
He died in 1948 at Bagra due heart attack and was survived by several sons.

== Legacy ==
His legacy of tile and contractor business was carried on by his brother, sons and grandsons like, Manji Ladha, Pragji Ruda, Maoji Ruda. The several tiles factory started by him and his brothers like, Ruda Ladha & Sons, Manji Ladha & Sons, Trisul Tile Works, Bagra Tile & Bricks Co., which continued to dominate tile market of India for at least seven decades, till the government environment policies lead to its decline in decade of 1980s and the industry is near its death-bed in current era, as there is complete ban an excavating yellow clay from Satpura forests. Manglore pattern tiles came to be known as Bagra Tiles after the village Bagra where factories in which these bricks were produced were located., thus throwing this obscure village on industrial map of India.
