= Vyapam scam =

Indian entrance-exam, admission and recruitment scam

The Vyapam scam was an entrance examination, admission and recruitment scam. It was functional since the 1990s and was finally unearthed in the Indian state of Madhya Pradesh in 2013.

The scam involved politicians, senior and junior officials and businessmen systematically employing imposters to write papers, manipulate exam hall seating arrangements and supply forged answer sheets by giving bribes to officials.

Madhya Pradesh Professional Examination Board (MPPEB), popularly known by its Hindi acronym "Vyapam" (Vyavsayik Pariksha Mandal), is a self-financed and autonomous body incorporated by the state government responsible for conducting several entrance tests in the state. These entrance exams are held for recruitment in government jobs and admissions in educational institutes of the state.

The scam involved 13 different exams conducted by Vyapam, for selection of medical students and state government employees (including food inspectors, transport constables, police personnel, school teachers, dairy supply officers and forest guards) where the final results were rigged. The exams were taken by around 3.2 million students each year, many of whom were actually paid proxies for other undeserving students. It also included an "engine-bogie" system wherein seating arrangements were manipulated so that a paid smarter student was seated between two others to allow the latter to copy answers from the former.

The scam involved a collusion of undeserving candidates, who bribed politicians and MPPEB officials through middlemen, to get high ranks in these entrance tests. The scam also led to between 23 and 40 'unnatural' deaths of involved individuals, though unofficial figures run well into more than a 100 custodial deaths including the erstwhile MP Governor's son and deaths in staged road accidents. Cases of irregularities in these entrance tests had been reported since the mid-1990s, and the first FIR was filed in 2000. However, until 2009, such cases were not thought to be part of an organized ring. When major complaints surfaced in the pre-medical test (PMT) in 2009, the state government established a committee to investigate the matter. The committee released its report in 2011, and over a hundred people were arrested by the police. However, none of the accused have been convicted as most of them either suspiciously died in custody or were released on bail.

The sheer scale of the scam came to light in 2013, when the Indore police arrested 20 people who had come to impersonate candidates for PMT 2009. The interrogation of these people led to the arrest of Jagdish Sagar, the leader of an organized racket involved in the scam. The state government established a Special Task Force (STF) on 26 August 2013. Subsequent interrogations and arrests uncovered the involvement of several politicians, bureaucrats, MPPEB officials, racket leaders, middlemen, candidates and their parents in the scam. By June 2015, more than 2000 people had been arrested in connection with the scam. These included the state's ex-education minister Laxmikant Sharma and over a hundred other politicians. In July 2015, the Supreme Court of India issued an order to transfer the case to the country's premier investigating agency, the Central Bureau of Investigation (CBI). In the same year, the Wikipedia page of Vyapam scam became the 19th most viewed page on Wikipedia globally.

Many senior personnel including Justice Bhushan who heads the Special Investigative team and Indian doctors including Anand Rai (the whistle blower in this case) are of the opinion that the Vyapam scam was functional since the 1990s when they themselves took their medical exams. They also believe that similar "systems" of proxies giving medical exams are operational in other states of India as well.

== The scam ==
Vyapam was entrusted with the responsibility of conducting large-scale competitive tests for admission to various professional courses and for recruitment to government jobs.

The Vyapam scam involved collusion among exam candidates, government officials and middlemen: undeserving candidates were offered high marks in the exams, in exchange for kickbacks. The following tricks were used by those involved in the scam:

Impersonation
Brilliant students (including previous years' top candidates) or practicing doctors would be paid to impersonate exam candidates. The photograph on the candidate's admit card was replaced by the impersonator's photograph. After the exam, it was changed back to the original. This was done in collusion with the corrupt board officials.

Copying
Undeserving candidates bribed the board officials through middlemen to be seated strategically next to a brilliant dummy candidate, who was also paid money. The dummy candidate let them copy from his sheet or exchanged the sheet at the end of the exam.

Manipulation of records and answer sheets
The undeserving candidates would leave their OMR answer sheets blank or fill in only the answers they were sure about. The corrupt board officials would manipulate records to give these candidates randomly high percentages. To avoid being caught in case of an audit, they would file an RTI request demanding to view these answer sheets, and fill in the answers according to the marks.

Leaking the answer key
The corrupt board officials leaked the answer key to the selected candidates.

== Unearthing of the scam ==
Cases of malpractice in Vyapam scam had been reported since 1995, and the first FIR was found in 2000 in Chhatarpur district. In 2004, seven cases were registered in Khandwa district. However, such reports of malpractice were seen as isolated cases.

=== 2009-11: Initial probe by committee ===
A report by the Madhya Pradesh Local Fund Audit office for 2007-08 found several financial and administrative irregularities in MPPEB, including unauthorized disposal of application forms. It was suspected that the application forms were being destroyed so that they could not be compared to exam admit cards and other records. In 2009, fresh complaints of irregularities in the pre-medical test (PMT) surfaced. Indore-based activist Anand Rai filed a Public Interest Litigation (PIL) requesting investigation into the scam. In 2009, Chief Minister Shivraj Singh Chouhan set up a committee headed by the State Joint Director of Medical Education to probe the allegations.

In July 2011, MPPEB monitored 145 suspects during the Pre-Medical Test (PMT). Most of the suspects did not turn up, but 8 were caught for impersonating others. This included Kanpur-based Satyendra Varma, who had accepted ₹ 4 lakh to appear in place of Ashish Yadav, in Indore. 15 exam toppers from the previous year appeared for the exam. Suspecting that these people were called in to impersonate others or to help candidates cheat by sitting adjacent to them, MPPEB asked them to explain their reasons for re-taking the exams. MPPEB also started using biometric technology: thumb impressions and photographs of all the persons appearing for the exam were taken to be matched during the post-results counselling.

The committee set up by Chouhan in 2009 submitted its report to the government in November 2011. It mentioned that 114 candidates had passed PMT using impersonation. The candidates, mostly from rich families, had been impersonated by practicing doctors and talented medical students, some of whom had come from neighbouring states of Uttar Pradesh and Bihar. The middlemen had charged each candidate ₹10-40 lakh. The findings raised concern that several fake doctors admitted through PMT in earlier years might have graduated as practitioners. The possibility of government officials being involved in the scam was also mentioned.

In December 2011, the MP Government announced that all the students who had gained admissions by fraudulent means would be asked to quit their courses. This included those who had already spent some years taking the course.

In 2012, Indore police arrested four people who had come to impersonate candidates in the PMT exam. The arrested had been promised sums ranging from ₹ 25,000 to ₹ 50,000 each.

=== 2013 MP-PMT exam ===
The massive scale of the Vyapam scam came to light in 2013. On the night of 6–7 July, the Indore police arrested 20 people from various city hotels. These people, 17 of whom were from Uttar Pradesh, had come to impersonate local candidates in the PMT exam scheduled on 7 July 2013. The impersonators had been promised sums ranging from ₹ 50,000 to ₹ 100,000. Based on information collected during the interrogation of these 20 impersonators, Indore police found out that an organized racket headed by Jagdish Sagar was involved in the scam. After the arrests and the revelation, Dr. Anand Rai submitted a complaint to the local Superintendent of Police (economic offence wing), seeking a detailed investigation. He sought probe into the role of MPPEB's chairman, exam controller, assistant controller and deputy controller.

On 13 July 2013, Jagdish Sagar was arrested in Mumbai. A list containing names of 317 students was confiscated from him. MPPEB's exam controller Pankaj Trivedi, who was not a suspect in the scam at that time, tried to protect these students. He sent a letter to various government departments and the deans of medical colleges, insisting that these students should be allowed admission once they sign an affidavit. The affidavit would state that they didn't use any unfair means, and that their admissions would be canceled if they were found guilty in the police investigations. On 28 September 2013, Trivedi was also arrested, based on Jagdish Sagar's interrogation. On 5 October, the Special Task Force (STF) of the police chargesheeted 28 people, including Jagdish Sagar. In December 2013, the STF produced a 23,000-page supplementary chargesheet against 34 accused in the Indore district court. Out of these 34 accused chargesheeted, 30 were students and their guardians. Four others included Pankaj Trivedi, Dr. Sanjeev Shilpkar and Dr. Jagdish Sagar's accomplice Gangaram Pipliya.

=== Other exams probed ===
In November 2013, the STF found that the scamsters had rigged five recruitment tests: Pre-PG, Food Inspector Selection Test, Milk Federation test, Subedar-Sub Inspector and Platoon Commander Selection Test and Police Constable Recruitment Test - all held during 2012 for government jobs in the state. For Pre-PG Test of 2012, MPPEB's former examination controller Dr Pankaj Trivedi and its system analyst Nitin Mahindra provided model answer keys to candidates through photocopies. For the other four exams, the Vyapam officials manipulated the OMR answer sheets by taking them out of the strong room. Different FIRs against 153 people, including Sudhir Sharma, were filed. Sharma had earlier been interrogated by CBI in mining scam of Madhya Pradesh. In March 2014, the government announced that the STF was investigating rigging of nine examinations, and 127 people had been arrested.

The previous years' PMT exams were also investigated. The STF found that 286 candidates had cleared PMT-2012 through fraudulent means. On 29 April 2014, 27 students of MGM Medical College in Indore were expelled for having used fraudulent means to clear PMT-2012.

In June 2014, the High Court asked the police why several of the accused in the case had not been arrested yet. Following this, the STF made several arrests. On 15 June, the STF arrested the state's former technical education minister and BJP leader Laxmikant Sharma for his alleged involvement in the contractual teachers recruitment scam. On 18 and 19 June 2014, the police arrested over 100 medical students from different parts of the state, for their involvement in the PMT scam.

In September 2014, the STF revealed that Jagdish Sagar's racket had also rigged the entrance exams for recruitment in SBI and other nationalized banks. These entrance exams included the Institute of Banking Personnel Selection's exams and the SBI Probationary Officer's exam.

== Investigations ==
Initial investigations into the irregularities were conducted by the various city units of the state police. During 2009-11, a committee established by the state government and headed by the State Joint Director of Medical Education, probed the irregularities in the PMT exam.

After the role of organized crime rackets and politicians in the scam came to light, the state government formed a Special Task Force (STF) of the police on 26 August 2013, to investigate the scam. Several activists and politicians, including members of the major opposition Indian National Congress party, demanded a CBI probe in the scam under the supervision of the Supreme Court of India. Chief Minister of Madhya Pradesh, Shivraj Singh Chouhan did not entertain the suggestion of a CBI inquiry to the probe initially. On 5 November 2014, Madhya Pradesh High Court also rejected the Congress leader Digvijay Singh's petition for CBI probe and instead ordered setting up of a special investigation team (SIT) to act as a watchdog for the court. The SIT is a three-member team chaired by Justice Chandresh Bhushan, a retired Judge of the Madhya Pradesh High Court. During 2014-2015, the scam was investigated by the STF under the supervision of SIT.

On 7 July 2015, after controversy about increasing number of allegedly suspicious deaths, Chouhan informed media that he will write to High Court of Madhya Pradesh requesting to order a CBI probe into the scam. On the same day, the opposition National Congress Party requested for resignation of Chouhan to allow fair probe into the scam. Application was filed before the High Court to transfer the investigation to the Central Bureau of Investigation (CBI), which however ordered to await the decision of the Supreme Court on similar applications. On 9 July 2015, the Attorney General for India told Supreme Court that State of Madhya Pradesh had no objection whatsoever for transferring the investigation to the CBI, upon which the Supreme Court ordered to transfer the 'criminal cases related to the scam and also the cases related to deaths allegedly linked with scam to the CBI, country's premier investigating agency. However who will monitor the investigation process was not announced.

== Key arrests ==
By June 2015, more than 2000 people had been arrested in connection with the scam.

=== Politicians and bureaucrats ===
Laxmikant Sharma, ex-Education Minister (M.P)
BJP leader Laxmikant Sharma was the in-charge of MPPEB in his capacity as the state's Technical Education Minister. He was initially arrested for his involvement in the contractual teachers recruitment scam, based on the information recovered from the Excel sheet maintained by Nitin Mohindra. Later, he was also booked for irregularities in the constables recruitment examinations; according to the STF, he recommended names of at least 15 candidates for recruitment as constables. He resigned from BJP in June 2014, after being sent to four days police remand. Sharma claimed innocence, placing the blame on his officer OP Shukla, and pointed out that his own daughter had failed PMT twice.

O. P. Shukla
He was posted as Officer on Special Duty (OSD) with then Technical Education Minister Laxmikant Sharma. Soon after the investigations gained momentum, he went underground and surrendered two months after the investigation team released a lookout notice for him. He allegedly took ₹85 lakh from the candidates for clearing the medical entrance test.

Sudhir Sharma
A mining businessman, Sudhir Sharma was once an Officer on Special Duty (OSD) of the education minister Laxmikant Sharma. He was involved in police constable recruitment examination scam of 2012. After absconding initially, he surrendered to the STF in December 2013. The STF questioned him twice, but did not arrest him at the time. After STF found prosecutable evidence against him, he again went missing. The STF announced a cash reward of ₹5000 for information on him. He surrendered before the court in 2014, and was arrested by the STF.
During 2010-2013, Sharma had provided payoffs to many politicians and bureaucrats, including former Madhya Pradesh BJP chief Prabhat Jha and his sons, Congress MLA Veer Singh Bhuria, several ABVP leaders, RSS functionary Suresh Soni, and many civil servants. Laxmikant Sharma was the biggest beneficiary of his kickbacks. He also received large sums of money from educational institutes regularly.

R. K. Shivhare, Suspended IPS Officer
He is an accused for his alleged involvement in the recruitment of sub-inspector and platoon commander examination of 2012 conducted by Vyapam. He is also an accused in getting his daughter and son-in-law admitted in the medical college by fraudulent means. When the probe agency registered a case against him, he was suspended but evaded arrest. He was declared absconder and a reward or ₹3000 was put against him. He later surrendered on 21 April 2014.

Ravikant Dwivedi, Suspended Joint Commissioner (Revenue)
He was arrested for getting his son admitted into one of the premiere medical colleges through unfair means. Later, the state anti-corruption wing raided his house and found cash, jewellery, property worth ₹60–70 crore.

=== Racket leaders ===
Several organized rackets were involved in the Vyapam scam. These included the gangs led by Dr. Jagdish Sagar, Dr. Sanjeev Shilpakar and Santosh Gupta, who were described as "kingpins" of the PMT scam. For PMT 2013, Dr. Sagar had given 317, Shilpakar 92 and Sanjay Gupta 48 names. Mahendra had recorded the details of these candidates in his computer and destroyed the list. While allotting roll numbers to these candidates, the slots immediately before or after them were left blank. These roll numbers were then allotted to fake candidates. The roll numbers were set at their homes and brought to office in a pen drive. After reaching the office, Mahendra uploaded the roll numbers to the computers. He then used to telephone the middlemen and provide a confirmation.

Dr. Jagdish Sagar
Indore-based Jagdish Sagar helped around 140 students get selected to the medical courses illegally, during 2009-12 alone. He arranged impersonators, largely sourced from Uttar Pradesh. He ran the alleged racket since the late 1990s, and had amassed a huge amount of wealth, including several real estate properties. He was arrested in 2003 on similar charges, but the police did not keep a watch on him after his release.

Dr Sanjeev Shilpakar
Bhopal-based Shilpakar was a junior of Jagdish Sagar in medical college, and started his own racket inspired by him. For PMT 2013, Shilpakar had enlisted 92 candidates, out of which 45 candidates had already paid him ₹3 crore. In turn, Shilpakar had bribed MPPEB officials including Nitin Mahindra, impersonators and brokers who brought candidates to him. He absconded after the arrest of Jagdish Sagar, but was later arrested by the STF.

Sudhir Rai, Santosh Gupta, Tarang Sharma
This gang was much bigger than (and a competitor to) Sagar's racket, and charged upwards of ₹ 25 lakh per candidate. The gang also facilitated admissions to medical colleges in Karnataka and Maharashtra. The Rai-Gupta racket was more organized than Sagar's racket and had branches in Ujjain, Shahdol, Sagar and Ratlam. Rai arranged candidates; Gupta arranged impersonators, most of whom came from Bihar. The gang is believed to have helped over 500 candidates gain admission to medical colleges illegally.

=== MPPEB employees ===
Pankaj Trivedi, MPPEB Examination Controller
He was arrested in September 2013 and is currently in a judicial custody. The state anti-corruption police has recovered around ₹2.5 crore rupees and numerous properties from his possession that are unknown to his sources of income. Evidence of his partnership in Indore based medical college was also found. Even after the Jagdish Sagar's racket was exposed, Trivedi managed to get an order that allowed Sagar's 317 candidates to get admission to medical courses on submission of an affidavit.

CK Mishra, Officer, Vyapam
CK Mishra has admitted that he was working for Dr. Sagar, Santosh Gupta and Sanjiv Shilpkar since 2009. In 2009, Dr. Sagar had given him application forms of 20 candidates, who were to be allotted roll numbers in such a way that in the exam, their seats were one behind the other. ₹50,000 per roll number was paid to him. Thus, he received Rs 1 million. In 2010, Dr. Sagar gave forms of 40 students. This time ₹20 lakh was paid. In 2012, Dr. Sagar took contract of 60 students, Shilpkar gave roll numbers of 20 boys. They paid ₹30 lakh and ₹10 lakh respectively.

Nitin Mohindra / Nitin Mahendra (Principal System Analyst) and Ajay Sen (Senior System Analyst)
Vyapam programmer Yashwant Parnekar and clerk Yuvraj Hingve said in their statements that the computers of Mahindra and Sen were not linked with the main server of Vyapam. These two officers could access the data stored in 25 other computers at Vyapam but the data in their computers could not be accessed by anyone. Taking advantage of this, they allotted roll numbers and examination centers as per their wish.

=== Others ===
Dr. G S Khanuja
On 13 September 2014, Special Task Force (STF) arrested the COO of Aurbindo hospital located in Indore. His son secured 12th rank in the medical examination of 2012 through unfair means.

Harshit Shrivastava

Harshit Shrivastava is a resident of Bhopal and has been appearing in cases of forgery since the last few years. His father, late Bhushan Shrivastava, was the PA of Madhya Pradesh's former Forest Minister Sartaj Singh. Taking advantage of his name, he dealt with the passing of the students in the examinations conducted by MP Vyapam. Along with the disclosure of the business scandal, Harshit Shrivastava was termed as a main accused and arrested by the SIT. Along with him, three other associates were also arrested. Harshit Shrivastava is currently on bail. Harshit Shrivastava had an important role in the excerpts of the Sanskrit Board exam, which has been confirmed by the SIT.

Mohit Chaudhary
Mohit Chaudhary, a native of Uttar Pradesh, was an MBBS student at MGM Medical College Indore, when he was first named in the Vyapam scam case. He had been named by some students accused of clearing MP PMT-2013 fraudulently.
Earlier, in 2012, he had been arrested by Delhi Police for helping students cheat in the AIIMS post-graduate entrance examination. He charged each candidate ₹ 15-18 lakh for a seat in AIIMS. For cheating during the exam, he provided the candidates a shirt with a Bluetooth chip stitched into it, tiny earphones and SIM cards.

Narendra Dev Azad
On 19 February 2015, the special investigation team (SIT) arrested him on the charges of acting as a middleman in the admission of Amar Singh Medha in 2009 in MGM College, Indore.

Dr. Vinod Bhandari
He is the main accused and was arrested on the charges of illegally helping students to get admission through Vyapam officers. He fled to Mauritius when he was named in the scam and returned only after an anticipatory bail was granted by the Madhya Pradesh High Court.

Animesh Akash Singh
He worked as a broker and got admitted four candidates in PMT.

Jitendra Malviya
A third year student of MBBS at MGM College of Indore who had got admitted one candidate in PMT 2013 through Dr. Sanjeev Shilpakar.

== Allegations of threats to whistleblowers and activists ==
Anand Rai
Indore-based Dr. Anand Rai filed a PIL which led to an investigation in the scam. He has reported receiving regular threat calls and has also alleged that contract killers were hired to kill him. In 2013, he approached the court requesting security cover. He was told to pay ₹ 50,000 per month for police protection, although his monthly salary was only ₹ 38,000. In 2015, he was provided with a security guard. Rai was accused of being a Congress agent by a BJP spokesperson, but he refuted the accusation pointing out that he had been a member of BJP, and was active in Rashtriya Swayamsevak Sangh activities from 2005 to 2013. He has also filed a petition in Supreme Court of India to hand over the investigation of DMAT scam, a private medical college admission scam.
In July 2015, Dr. Rai was transferred from Indore to Dhar district. He alleged that it was done to harass him as he lodged a complaint with CBI against former Union minister and BJP leader Vikram Verma. In the complaint it was alleged that Vikram Verma used his influence to get his daughter transferred from Ghaziabad to Gandhi Medical College in Bhopal.
On 2 September 2015, Dr. Rai submitted an affidavit in Madhya Pradesh High Court alleging that Chief Minister Shivraj Singh Chouhan met him and proposed to cancel the transfer orders if he stops campaigning against him over Vyapam and DMAT scam. The principal secretary confirmed the meeting but said it was arranged at the request of Dr. Rai as he wanted to share some scam related information.

Ashish Chaturvedi
Gwalior-based social activist Ashish Chaturvedi lodged a complaint against 8 people, one of whom was Gulab Singh Kirar's son Shakti Singh; Kirar is a relative of the Chief Minister. Chaturvedi had also petitioned CBI to probe admissions of 5,000 doctors in MBBS and PG courses of 2003-2013 in all state colleges. He suffered three attacks on his life, including an abduction bid. He has alleged that the police refused to provide him adequate protection after he complained of threats to his life. The police reportedly asked him to pay ₹ 50,000 for protection or remain confined in his home.

Prashant Pandey
Indore-based Prashant Pandey had been hired as an IT consultant by the Special Task Force (STF) investigating the scam. He was arrested in 2014 for allegedly blackmailing the Vyapam accused using the call detail records (CDRs) collected by the investigating team. He approached the Indian National Congress leader Digvijaya Singh, claiming to be a whistleblower who was being falsely implicated for trying to expose the involvement of senior BJP leaders (including Chief Minister Shivraj Singh Chouhan) in the scam. Subsequently, he has reported receiving death threats. He has also alleged that some unidentified people tried to kill his family by ramming a truck into their car, but the police investigation concluded that his car had collided with a dead cow on the street. In July 2015, the police briefly detained his wife accusing her of having illegal hawala cash; Pandey alleged that this was done to intimidate and harass him.

== Allegations against the Governor ==
The STF also found evidence against the state Governor Ram Naresh Yadav. On 24 February 2015, Yadav was charged for criminal conspiracy in rigging the MPPEB forest guard recruitment examination. His son Shailesh was an accused in the contractual teachers' recruitment and later found dead in mysterious circumstances in March, 2015. His former officer-on-special-duty Dhanraj Yadav was arrested by STF in 2013 in connection with the scam. The Governor petitioned the High Court arguing that no criminal proceedings could be initiated against him, as the Constitution of India grants him immunity while he is in office. The High Court agreed and stayed his arrest, but ordered the investigations against him to proceed. The SIT chief declared that the investigators will act against Yadav after his retirement in September 2016. Three advocates petitioned the Supreme Court to order removal of Yadav as Governor. A bench comprising Chief Justice of India H. L. Dattu and Justices Arun Kumar Mishra and Amitava Roy has agreed to hear the petition on 9 July. The CBI was set to investigate the Vyapam scam and more than 30 deaths allegedly linked to the job recruitment scandal, according to a ruling by the Supreme Court on 9 July 2015.

== Allegations against the Chief Minister ==
In 2014, Prashant Pandey (aka "Mr. X"), an IT consultant hired by the STF, was arrested for trying to use the team's information to blackmail the Vyapam accused. Pandey then approached the Indian National Congress leader Digvijaya Singh, and claimed that he was a whistleblower who was being harassed for exposing the role of Chief Minister Shivraj Singh Chouhan in the scam. He alleged that the investigating agencies had tampered with the contents of the Excel sheet recovered from hard disk of the scam accused Nitin Mohindra's computer. Mohindra maintained a record of the candidates' names, their roll numbers and the names of those who had recommended them. Hundreds of people were arrested based on the information in this sheet. Pandey claimed that the investigators had modified the original version of the sheet by removing the names of senior BJP leaders, including Chouhan, from the sheet.

Digvijaya Singh then submitted a 15-page affidavit before the SIT, alleging that the investigators were shielding the Chief Minister. SIT took cognisance of Singh's complaint, and sent both versions of the Excel sheet for forensic analysis. The forensic laboratory reported that the Excel sheet available with STF was genuine, while Pandey's version was forged. Accordingly, Singh's submission was rejected as a forgery by Justice Khanwilkar in the MP High Court.

Pandey stood by his version, and stated that it had been authenticated by Truth Labs, a private forensic lab. He approached the Delhi High Court for protection as a whistleblower, claiming persecution by the MP Police. He claimed that he first sent the documents to the BJP minister Kailash Vijayvargiya and the Prime Minister's Office; he approached Congress leaders only when he did not receive any response. Pandey also stated that he was getting threat calls from influential people. The Delhi court therefore ordered police protection for him in February 2015. However, it was withdrawn in mid May 2015.

Chouhan hit back at his critics, saying that his government should be credited for the exposing the scam. He stated that only 228 out of 350,000 appointments made during his tenure had been affected by the recruitment scam, and unlike previous governments, he had conducted a thorough probe. Replying to Congress' allegations that his wife had got jobs for 17 of her relatives from Gondia, he pointed out that not a single candidate from Gondia had got the job in the question.

== Deaths ==
A number of people connected to the scam and its investigation, died during the course of investigation. The opposition parties and activists alleged that several of these deaths happened under suspicious circumstances. In 2015, the Special Task Force (STF) submitted a list to Jabalpur High Court, naming 23 people who are believed to have died "unnatural death". According to the STF, most of these deaths took place before it took over the investigation in July 2013. Some media reports claimed that 40+ people associated with the scam had died under mysterious circumstances.

The State Government dismissed the allegations, arguing that Vyapam conducts very large-scale examinations and thousands of people are admitted or recruited through these exams every year. Chief Minister Shivraj Singh Chouhan insisted that death of every person linked with Vyapam exams should not be linked to the Vyapam scam. The state's Home Minister Babulal Gaur claimed that the deaths were "natural".

According to whistleblower Anand Rai, 10 of these deaths are suspicious, while the rest might be coincidences. The deaths considered as suspicious by him include the deaths of Akshay Singh, Namarata Damor, Narendra Tomar, D K Sakkale, Arun Sharma, Rajendra Arya and four middlemen who died in road accidents.

According to the High-Court Special Investigation Team (SIT), 32 people in 25-30 age-group identified as 'racketeers' during the investigation, died in suspicious circumstances since the investigation started in 2012. The SIT officials raised concerns that the arrested people were naming those who were already dead, in order to mislead the probe.

The following is a list of "unnatural deaths" mentioned in the STF and SIT records, plus other deaths alleged to be "suspicious" by the opposition parties and the media.

1. Vikas Pandey
2. Ravindra Pratap Singh
3. Dr. DK Sakalley
4. Narendra Rajput
5. Lalit Golaria
6. Gyan Singh Jatav
7. Deepak Verma
8. Namrata Damor
9. Pramod Sharma
10. Kuldeep Marawi
11. Premlata Pandey
12. Vikas Singh Thakur
13. Shyamvir Yadav
14. Anshul Sachan
15. Anuj Uikey
16. Deepak Jain
17. Dinesh Jatav
18. Aditya Chaudhary
19. Anant Ram Tagore
20. Arvind Shakya
21. Ashutosh Tiwari
22. Tarun Macchar
23. Anand Singh Yadav
24. Devendra Nagar
25. Bunty Sikarwar
26. Amit Sagar
27. Sanjay Singh Yadav
28. Shailesh Yadav
29. Vijay Singh Patel
30. Narendra Singh Tomar
31. Rajendra Arya
32. Akshay Singh
33. Dr Arun Sharma
34. Anamika Kushwaha
35. Ramakant Pandey
36. Ramendra Singh Bhadoria

Other accused declared dead in SIT's report include the following:

1. Anand Singh (Barwani)
2. Anuj Pandey
3. Brijesh Rajput (Barwani)
4. Gyan Singh (Sagar)
5. Manish Kumar Samadhia (Jhansi)
6. Pashupati Nath / Lalit Kumar Pashupatinath Jaiswal
7. Vikram Singh

== Reactions on social media ==
The mysterious deaths of people linked to Vyapam scam triggered dark humour on various social media platforms across India. People compared it to the fictional television series Dexter and termed it as India's version of Game of Thrones. The untimely and sudden death of a journalist soon after interviewing the family members of another dead accused was considered inauspicious. An online perception was created that any sort of link to the scam could bring trouble or even mysterious death.

Various hashtags such as #KhooniVyapam (Bloody Vyapam), #killervyapamscam, #vyapam, #VyapamGenocide, and #shivrajisteefado (Shivraj, resign) were used by people to post their reactions.

== Judgement ==
On 13 February 2017, the Supreme Court of India delivered an 83-page judgement and cancelled the degrees of 634 doctors. The court said:

The actions of the appellants are founded on unacceptable behaviour and in complete breach of rule of law. Their actions constitute acts of deceit...National character, in our considered view, cannot be sacrificed for benefits - individual or societal...If we desire to build a nation on the touchstone of ethics and character, and if our determined goal is to build a nation where only rule of law prevails, then we cannot accept the claim of the appellants (students) for suggested societal gains (by allowing them to keep the degrees on the condition of doing social service free of cost for some years)..We have no difficulty in concluding in favour of rule of law... Fraud cannot be allowed to trounce, on the stratagem of public good.

== Films ==
- Shiksha Mandal - a 2022 Hindi-language web series released on MX Player is based on the Vyapam scam.
- The Whistleblower is a 2021 Hindi-language web series released on SonyLIV which have been inspired by the Vyapam scam, which involved staggering levels of fraud in the entrance examinations process and recruitment for government postings.
- Halahal is a 2020 crime thriller film directed by Randeep Jha based on Vyapam scam.

== See also ==
- List of scandals in India
