= Jayavarman (Chandela dynasty) =

- Nṛpati

King of Jejakabhukti
- Reign: c. 1110–1120 CE
- Predecessor: Sallakshanavarman
- Successor: Prithvivarman
- Dynasty: Chandela
- Father: Sallakshanavarman

Jayavarman (reigned c. 1110–1120 CE) was a king of the Chandela dynasty of India. He succeeded his father Sallakshana-Varman as the ruler of the Jejakabhukti region (Bundelkhand in present-day Madhya Pradesh and Uttar Pradesh). The Chandela descriptions contain only vague eulogies of him, so little historical information is known about his reign. He abdicated the throne in favour of his uncle Prithvi-Varman.

== Early life ==
Jayavarman was the son of his predecessor Sallakshana-Varman, as stated in the Mau inscription of Madana-Varman.

The only available inscription of Jayavarman is the post-script to an inscription originally issued by his ancestor Dhanga. This inscription, now affixed to the porch of the Vishvanatha temple at Khajuraho, states that "Nṛpati Jayavarmma-deva" had it re-written in clear letters, presumably because it had become illegible or had been damaged. The inscription contains conventional praise of the king, and states that Jayavarman had uprooted "mountain-like great princes" in battles.

This inscription is dated 6 April 1117 CE. In absence of any other evidence, and dating Sallakshana's ascension to 1100 CE, Jayavarman's ascension can be dated to 1110 CE, assuming 10 years for each generation.

== Career ==
The inscriptions of Jayavarman's successors also contain vague eulogies about him. The Mau inscription calls him the residence of "generosity, truth, policy and heroism". It also states that he outshone the princes just like a rising sun deprives lamps of their lustre. The Ajaygarh inscription of Vira-Varman calls him the sole abode of victory, but does not name any rivals defeated by him.

According to the Mau inscription, the minister Ananta who had served two of Jayavarman's predecessors, continued to serve the king and died during his reign. Ananta's son Gadadhara held the post of pratihara (chamberlain). The Ajaygarh inscription mentions another hereditary officer named Shridhara. According to the Khajuraho inscription, Jayapala of the Gauda family was Jayavarman's kayastha (a clerk attached to the king's office).

Like his father, Jayavarman is known to have issued copper coins featuring the deity Hanuman. These coins state his name as Shrima-jayavarma-deva. No gold coins issued by him have been discovered. He commissioned renovation of some buildings at Khajuraho.

== Abdication ==
A Kalanjara inscription states that Jayavarman abdicated the throne after being tired of governance. A devotee of Narayana, he proceeded to the "divine river" to wash away his sins. He appears to have died without an heir, as he was succeeded by his uncle Prithvi-Varman. The Chandela genealogy mentioned in the Nanyaura copper-plate inscription of Prithvi-Varman's successor Madana-Varman omits the name of Jayavarman and his father Sallakshana-Varman.
