= DMAT scam =

The DMAT scam was a ₹10,000 crore (US$1.56 billion) dental and medical college admission scam, which was fully exposed in June 2015 in Madhya Pradesh when the Controller of Dental and Medical Admission Test (DMAT) exam, Yogesh Uprit, was arrested. Indore based RTI activist and whistleblower Dr. Anand Rai was the first to complain against the mass irregularities in admissions into the private medical colleges. In 2015, he filed a petition in the Supreme Court of India demanding CBI investigation in the alleged scam. After hearing the plea, the Supreme Court of India said that the DMAT scam was worse than the Vyapam scam. After that, notices to Central and State governments were issued and asked why the CBI probe should not be ordered. On August 13, 2015, CBI told the Supreme Court that the DMAT scam is many times larger than the Vyapam scam. However, due to a shortage of manpower resources, it could not be investigated by the agency. On September 4, 2015, the Supreme Court of India issued a notice to the Madhya Pradesh government and sought a reply from the state.

== Scam ==
The Dental and Medical Admission Test (DMAT) is an examination held for admission into the private medical colleges of Madhya Pradesh, India. This exam is conducted by the Association for Private Medical and Dental Colleges (APDMC) and this scam had been running since its inception in 2006. An irregularity came to the forefront when the first complaint of fraud by Dr. Jai Chandra was made in 2013. Subsequently, on September 16, 2013, two people named Surendra Singh Chauhan and Ranveer Singh were arrested on the charges of duping around a dozen students from Andhra Pradesh for ₹ 1.35 crore. The duped students were promised admission to the private medical colleges of Madhya Pradesh.

An engineering student from Chhattisgarh, named Rocky was asked to interact with the aspirants and their kin, as the arrested duo were not good in spoken English. Later during the course of investigation, it was found that Rocky was not involved in the crime but was used only to interact with the victims.

== Investigation ==
After the confession of DMAT officials of being involved in the scam, the police team seized the hard disk and electronic records from the DMAT’s office. The arrested duo used to work as admission agents for engineering colleges and also helped students to clear the semester exams. However, in order to earn more, they shifted the focus towards admission in medical colleges, which is comparatively more lucrative. In 2013, police said that it is difficult to assess the depth of the scam but the financial background of accused is a clear indication of huge amount of money involved in it. By the end of 2013, around dozen interstate gangs were arrested.

The police tried to extract some information from the DMAT controller A W Khan, but he died on October 5, 2013, during interrogation. His death was a roadblock to the investigation. However, later the investigating team found some lead that suggested the involvement of private medical college authorities in the forgery, which led to the arrest of Controller of Dental and Medical Admission Test (DMAT) exam, Yogesh Uprit.

In July 2015, the appellate authority of Admission and Fee Regulatory Committee (AFRC), a statutory body for professional colleges, pointed to a massive scam involving private colleges. The candidates used to pay between ₹ 15 Lakh to ₹ 1 crore to get the admission in undergraduate or postgraduate courses.

== Modus operandi ==
The gangs operated from internet cafes to the college premises. They used to introduce themselves as the personal assistants of college directors, doctors and claimed to yield considerable influence in the office of DMAT. The candidates who paid the amount were directed to leave the OMR sheet blank and were filled later. The state quota and NRI seats used to get filled up against the seats that were vacated on the last day of the admission process.

During the course of investigation, the police team found that the aspirants who paid to the gang used to get exact numbers in the examination as was needed to get the admission in the college of their choice.

== Accused ==
#	Name	Role	Status	Source
1	Anupam Chouksey	He was DMAT Secretary and Director of LN Medical College. After the arrest he confessed of accepting the admission forms of two candidates past due date	Out on bail	
2	Yogesh Urpit	Former Director of Madhya Pradesh Professional Examination Board (MPPEB). He told the investigators that the modus operandi of Vyapam scam and DMAT scam was the same	Out on bail	
3	Surendra Singh Chauhan	A class X dropout, he confessed to have managed admissions of more than 50 students in past few years. On August 2, 2015, unidentified people tried to kill him but he escaped with minor bullet injuries. He said he wanted to file a PIL seeking a CBI inquiry into the death of ex-DMAT controller A W Khan, who died under mysterious circumstances during the investigation. Due to his sudden death the probe was derailed	Out on bail	
4	Ranveer Singh Anand	An engineer by profession	Arrested	
5	Sandeep	A native of Uttar Pradesh	Arrested	
6	Rajendra Singh	A resident of Rewa (M.P) and a member of BJP. He worked as a contractor for parking lots in Bhopal	Arrested	
7	Adarsh Kumar alias Aditya	A native of Bihar and a student of National Institute of Technology (Raipur). The team recovered ₹ 5 lakh from him	Arrested	
8	Jitu alias Dr. Raghuvanshi	He used to introduce himself as a doctor but never talked to the victims via his mobile phone. Instead, he asked them to drop him an SMS on the pretext of being in the operation theatre	On the run	
9	Abhijeet Gupta	-	On the run	
10	Sumit	-	On the run	
11	Akhilesh Singh	-	On the run	

== Allegations against state government ==
The investigation team had come across specific inputs on the involvement of ministers, judicial members, police officers and others at high position in the Madhya Pradesh government. Indore based whistleblower Dr. Anand Rai alleged that huge amount of black money is involved in the scam and the business of illegal admissions was going on since 2006.

The Indian National Congress, an opposition party, has alleged that Chief Minister Shivraj Singh Chouhan's kin were the beneficiaries in the DMAT scam. The charge has been strongly denied by the ruling Bharatiya Janata Party.

== Exam cancellation ==
Due to continuous revelations of collusion between Vyapam and DMAT authorities and threats from a whistleblower to name judges allegedly involved in the scam, the state examination body on July 10, 2015, cancelled the admission test to be held on July 12, 2015. However, the officials said that the examination was postponed due to some technical reasons.
