= Prahlad Pandey =

Indian politician

Prahlad Pandey is an Indian politician who is the spokesperson of the Madhya Pradesh wing of the Aam Aadmi Party (AAP, English: Common Man's Party). He has been active in mobilizing, organizing and building party cadre in Madhya Pradesh, Maharashtra and Rajasthan.

== Early life and education ==
Prahalad Pandey was born in the village of Rajapur located in the Satna District of Madhya Pradesh, India. He would walk a muddy road and swim across a river to attend school in town. In 2000, Pandey graduated in history, economics and political science from Govt JT College, Satna. In 2001, he received a Bachelor of Education from the Government College of Education in Dewas. In 2003, he received his post graduation in business economics from APS University Rewa. From 2003 to 2005, he taught in a government school in Satna. In 2006, he qualified for UGC-NET to teach economics. Between 2005 and 2009, he taught various disciplines of MBA courses at Institute of Chartered Financial Analysts of India (ICFAI) National College. Pandey travelled to Indore in 2009, and taught in some reputed business schools.

== Activism and political career ==
In the 1998 assembly elections, Pandey and other village boys successfully convinced the villagers to abstain from voting. In 2001, he unsuccessfully fielded a people's candidate in the gram panchayat (village self-government) elections.

In September 2011, Pandey left his job and PhD studies to join India Against Corruption movement. During this time, he worked as visiting faculty, corporate trainer and magazine editor. He led the Lokpal Movement in Indore, where he fasted for five days and received written support from three members of parliament. The movement received help from Art of Living and Bharat Swabhiman Trust.

Pandey led a protest against Madhya Pradesh Chief Minister Shivraj Singh Chouhan's alleged role in a coal scam. Arrested in the protest, Pandey refused bail and spent two days in jail.

Pandey is a founding member of the Aam Aadmi Party (AAP). In addition to his work in Madhya Pradesh, he played a pivotal role in the party's spread to Rajasthan and Maharashtra. He campaigned for the AAP for five months in Delhi and played an important role in the party's victory in the 2015 Delhi Legislative Assembly election. He is the party spokesperson in Madhya Pradesh and a member of the party's state executive and national council.

Pandey has presented papers in national and international seminars, including a Tedx Talk in 2011. He writes for news portals and has had articles published in Nai Duniya and Dainik Jagran.

== Personal life ==
Pandey lives in Sudama Nagar Indore with his wife and son. Two police cases have been registered against him in relation to protests against former Madhya Pradesh CM Shivraj Singh Chouhan.
