= Bagra Tawa =

Village in Madhya Pradesh, India

Coordinates: 22°38′N 78°00′E

Bagra Tawa is a village in Narmadapuram district of Madhya Pradesh State of India.

The Bagra Tawa railway station of the village lies on the Jabalpur - Itarsi railway line of Western Central Railway Zone of Indian Railway.
