= Gaya Prasad Pal =

Indian anatomist, Emeritus Professor

- Born: 7 June 1950 (age 76); Indore, Madhya Pradesh, India
- Education: Mahatma Gandhi Memorial Medical College
- Known for: Studies on biomechanics and load transmission of human spinal column
- Awards: 1989 Shakuntala Amirchand Prize; 1993 Shanti Swarup Bhatnagar Prize
- Scientific career
- Fields: Clinical anatomy
- Workplaces: Mahatma Gandhi Memorial Medical College; Government Medical College, Surat; MP Shah Medical College, Jamnagar; Modern Institute of Medical Sciences; Index Medical College Hospital And Research Center Indore

Gaya Prasad Pal (born 7 June 1950) is an Indian anatomist, Emeritus Professor at MGM Medical College, Indore, and adjunct professor at Index Medical College, Indore. An elected fellow of the National Academy of Medical Sciences, Indian Academy of Sciences and National Academy of Sciences, India, Pal is known for his researches on biomechanics and load transmission of human spinal column. The Council of Scientific and Industrial Research, the apex agency of the Government of India for scientific research, awarded him the Shanti Swarup Bhatnagar Prize for Science and Technology, one of the highest Indian science awards for his contributions to Medical Sciences in 1993. (Note: Long link - please select award year to see details)

== Biography ==
Pal was born on 7 June 1950 in Indore, an industrial city in the Indian state of Madhya Pradesh, to Baboolal Kalideen and Kaserben. He received a diploma in medicine from Mahatma Gandhi Memorial Medical College, Indore, in 1973. He then joined the institution as a demonstrator, simultaneously studying for an MS in Anatomy, which he earned in 1977. He later moved to the Government Medical College, Surat, as an assistant professor at the department of anatomy and was serving as an associate professor when he was appointed as the professor and head of the department of anatomy at MP Shah Medical College, Jamnagar, in 1992. Later, he joined Modern Institute of Medical Sciences, Indore, where he served as Dean and Director of the institute. In the meantime, he also worked as a visiting faculty at the Medical College of Pennsylvania, Philadelphia, during 1985–86 and 1987–90.

He was appointed as emeritus professor at MGM Medical College, Indore, in 2015. He has been serving as adjunct professor of anatomy at Index Medical College in Indore since 2024.

Pal is married to Pushpa Verma and the couple has two children, Sandeep and Neeta. The family lives in Padmavati Colony, Indore.

== Legacy ==
Focusing his researches on the biomechanics of human spinal column, Pal elucidated the roles played by vertebral arches and their zygapophyseal joints in weight transmission along the vertebral column. These studies have assisted in the understanding the spinal disorder called idiopathic scoliosis. His researches have been documented by way of several articles (Note: Please see Selected bibliography section) and the online repository of scientific articles of the Indian Academy of Sciences has listed a number of them. Besides, he has published several books which include Illustrated Textbook of Neuroanatomy, Text Book of Histology, Basics Of Medical Genetics, Human Embryology, General Anatomy (basic Concepts In Human Gross Anatomy), Human Osteology: Text and Colour Atlas, Text Book of Neuroanatomy for Medical Students, Thieme Dissector, and Medical Genetics and his work has been cited in many text books on anatomy, orthopaedics, neuroanatomy, and forensic medicine. He also serves as the editor of the Histology section of the Journal of Anatomical Society of India.

Recently he edited the first South Asian edition of "Grant's Atlas of Anatomy".

== Awards and honors ==
The Indian Council of Medical Research (ICMR) awarded him the "Shakuntala Amirchand Prize" in 1989. The Council of Scientific and Industrial Research awarded him Shanti Swarup Bhatnagar Prize, one of the highest Indian science awards in 1993. The Indian Academy of Sciences elected him as a fellow in 1994 and the National Academy of Sciences, India and the National Academy of Medical Sciences followed suit in 1995 and 1996 respectively. He is also a founder fellow of the Anatomical Society of India.

He received the Lifetime Achievement Award from the Anatomical Society of India in 2022. Since 2020, he has consistently been listed among the world's top 2% of scientists, as identified by Stanford University. He ranked first in India and 102nd worldwide in the 2020 Stanford University global ranking of scientists.

He received many awards and honours by Anatomical Society of India: Dr. Dharm Narayan Gold Medal (1986), Dr. Liza Chako Award (1984), Dr HJ Mehta Memorial Gold Medal (1989 and 1990) and Dr. Mahdi Hassan Gold Medal (1991). South Gujarat University, Surat conferred him Degree of D.Sc. in 1993.

== Selected bibliography ==
=== Books ===
- Inderbir Singh; G. P. Pal (2001). Human Embryyology. Educa Books. ISBN 978-0-333-93693-1.
- G. P. Pal (1 January 2008). General Anatomy (basic Concepts In Human Gross Anatomy). Peepee Publishers and Distributors (P) Limited. ISBN 978-81-8445-046-0.
- G. P. Pal (2009). Medical Genetics. A.I.T.B.S. Publishers. ISBN 978-81-7473-401-3.
- G. P. Pal (2011). Human Osteology: Text and Colour Atlas. Peepee Publishers and Distributors. ISBN 978-81-8445-091-0.
- G. P. Pal (2012). Illustrated Textbook of Neuroanatomy. Iippincott Williams & Wilkins. p. 483. ISBN 978-8184735079.
- G. P. Pal (2015). Text Book of Histology. Paras Medical Publishers. p. 475. ISBN 978-8181914392.
- G P Pal (2003). Basics Of Medical Genetics, 2/Ed. AITBS Publishers. ISBN 978-81-7473-220-0.

=== Articles ===
- G. P. Pal, S. S. Bhagwat and R. V. Routal (1986). "A study of sutural bones in Gujarati (Indian) crania". Anthropologischer Anzeiger. 44 (1): 67–76. JSTOR 29539668. PMID 3963790.
- G. P. Pal, R. V. Routal (1986). "A study of weight transmission through the cervical and upper thoracic regions of the vertebral column in man". J. Anat. 148: 245–61. PMC 1261605. PMID 3693090.
- G. P. Pal, R. V. Routal (1987). "Transmission of weight through the lower thoracic and lumbar regions of the vertebral column in man". J. Anat. 152: 93–105. PMC 1261749. PMID 3654379.
- G. P. Pal, R. V. Routal and S. S. Bhagwat (1988). "A study of non-metric (qualitative) variation in Gujarati crania". Anthropologischer Anzeiger. 46 (1): 65–74. doi:10.1127/anthranz/46/1988/65. JSTOR 29539855. PMID 3389767.
- G. P. Pal, R. V. Routal (1991). "Relationship between the articular surface area of a bone and the magnitude of stress passing through it". Anat. Rec. 230 (4): 570–4. doi:10.1002/ar.1092300417. PMID 1928762. S2CID 41393349.
- G. P. Pal (1999). "Mechanism of production of scoliosis. A hypothesis". Spine. 16 (3): 288–92. doi:10.1097/00007632-199103000-00006. PMID 2028300. S2CID 38751326.
- G. P. Pal, R. V. Routal, S. K. Saqqu (2001). "The orientation of the articular facets of the zygapophyseal joints at the cervical and upper thoracic region". J. Anat. 198 (Pt. 4): 431–41. doi:10.1046/j.1469-7580.2001.19840431.x. PMC 1468229. PMID 11327205.

== See also ==
- Vertebral column
