= Champa Devi Shukla =

Indian activist from Bhopal

- Born: Bhopal, India
- Awards: Goldman Environmental Prize (2004)

Champa Devi Shukla is an Indian activist from Bhopal. She was awarded the Goldman Environmental Prize in 2004, together with Rashida Bee. Shukla and Bee have struggled for justice for those who survived the 1984 Bhopal disaster, when 20,000 people were killed, and organized campaigns and trials against the responsible company and its owners.

== Bhopal Gas Tragedy ==
Champa Devi Shukla, along with Rashida Bee, led an international campaign seeking justice for the survivors of the 1984 Union Carbide Gas Tragedy in Bhopal. Starting with protests and rallies in India, Shukla took her fight against Union Carbide Company (UCC) and its partner, Dow Chemicals, to the streets of New York and other American cities. Dow Chemicals is today fighting a series of cases filed by Champa and other protesters. In 2002, they organised a 19-day hunger strike in New Delhi, demanding that the former Union Carbide CEO Warren Anderson face a criminal trial in Bhopal.

== Awards ==
Shukla, along with Bee, was awarded the 2004 Goldman Environmental Prize for bringing the Bhopal disaster to the international center stage.

== Personal life ==
Shukla works at the Central Government Press, where she is a junior binder. She was married to a government employee who was killed by cancer in 1997. Two of Shukla's sons also died due to health problems as a result of the methyl isocyanate gas leak. Three other children are still alive, but none lead a normal life.
