= Sita Sahu =

Indian sportswoman

- Occupation: Athletics
- Years active: 2011-present
- Known for: Bronze medal in Special Olympics

Sita Sahu is a double Special Olympics medalist from India. Originally from Madhya Pradesh, she was barely fifteen when she won bronze medals for the 200 and 4X400 meter relay races held in 2011 during the Special Olympics in Athens. Media reports suggest that, struggling economically, Sita has joined her family's street food business.
