= Amit Sood =

Professor of medicine

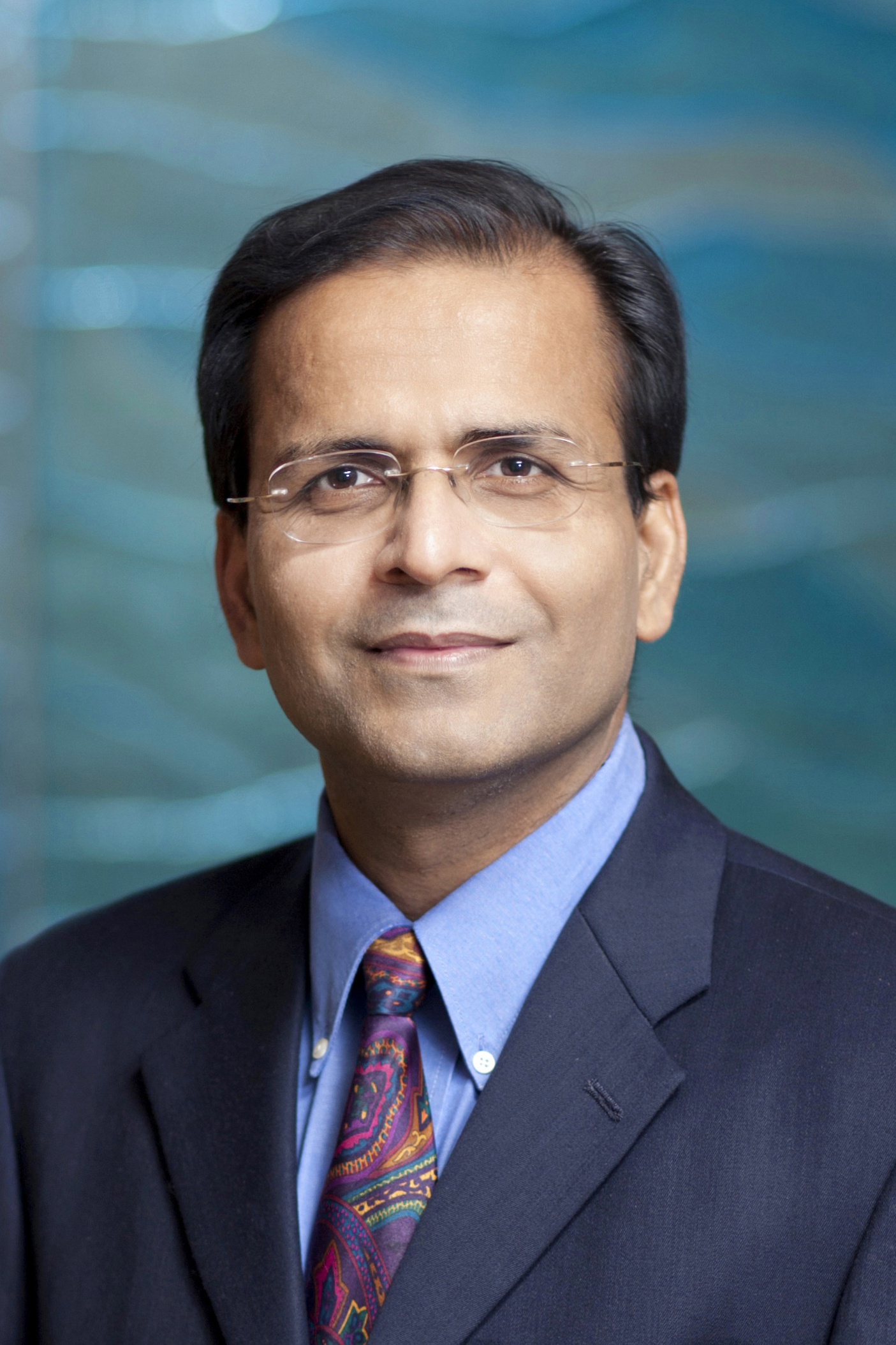
- The Mayo Clinic Guide to Stress-Free Living
- Born: Bhopal, India
- Education: Gandhi Medical College, Bhopal, AIIMS, New Delhi
- Occupations: Integrative medicine practitioner, researcher, physician and writer
- Title: Professor of medicine at Mayo Clinic College of Medicine
- Spouse: Richa Sood
- Website: www.stressfree.org

Amit Sood, known as "The Happiness Doctor", is the founder and executive director of the Global Center for Resiliency and Wellbeing. Formerly, he was a professor of medicine at Mayo Clinic College of Medicine, Rochester, Minnesota, and chair of the Mayo Mind Body Initiative. He completed degrees in medicine from Gandhi Medical College, Bhopal, All India Institute of Medical Sciences, New Delhi and Albert Einstein College of Medicine, New York.

Sood held various positions at Mayo Clinic (research fellow, Consultant, Instructor of Medicine) and fellow of the American College of Physicians.

He's the co-developer of HappiGenius, a program designed on social-emotional learning for children.

== Works ==
=== Books ===
- Sood, Amit (2015). The Mayo Clinic Handbook for Happiness. Da Capo Lifelong Books. ISBN 978-0738217857.
- Sood, Amit (2013). The Mayo Clinic Guide to Stress-Free Living. Da Capo Lifelong Books. ISBN 978-0738217123.
- Sood, Amit (2015). Immerse: A 52-Week Course in Resilient Living: A Commitment to Live With Intentionality, Deeper Presence, Contentment, and Kindness. (Volume 1). Da Capo Lifelong Books. ISBN 978-0692615416.

=== Peer-reviewed papers ===
Sood's papers with more than two hundred citations apiece include the following:

- Sood A, Prasad K, Schroeder D, Varkey P. Stress management and resilience training among Department of Medicine faculty: a pilot randomized clinical trial. Journal of General Internal Medicine. 2011 Aug 1;26(8):858-61.
- Loprinzi CE, Prasad K, Schroeder DR, Sood A. Stress Management and Resilience Training (SMART) program to decrease stress and enhance resilience among breast cancer survivors: a pilot randomized clinical trial. Clinical breast cancer. 2011 Dec 1;11(6):364-8.
- Barton DL, Liu H, Dakhil SR, Linquist B, Sloan JA, Nichols CR, McGinn TW, Stella PJ, Seeger GR, Sood A, Loprinzi CL. Wisconsin Ginseng (Panax quinquefolius) to improve cancer-related fatigue: a randomized, double-blind trial, N07C2. Journal of the National Cancer Institute. 2013 Aug 21;105(16):1230-8. (258 citation)
- Leppin AL, Bora PR, Tilburt JC, Gionfriddo MR, Zeballos-Palacios C, Dulohery MM, SoodA, Erwin PJ, Brito JP, Boehmer KR, Montori VM. The efficacy of resiliency training programs: a systematic review and meta-analysis of randomized trials. PloS one. 2014 Oct 27;9(10):e111420.
- Bardia A, Tleyjeh IM, Cerhan JR, Sood AK, Limburg PJ, Erwin PJ, Montori VM. Efficacy of antioxidant supplementation in reducing primary cancer incidence and mortality: systematic review and meta-analysis. InMayo Clinic Proceedings 2008 Jan 1 (Vol. 83, No. 1, pp. 23–34). Elsevier.
