= Sallakshanavarman =

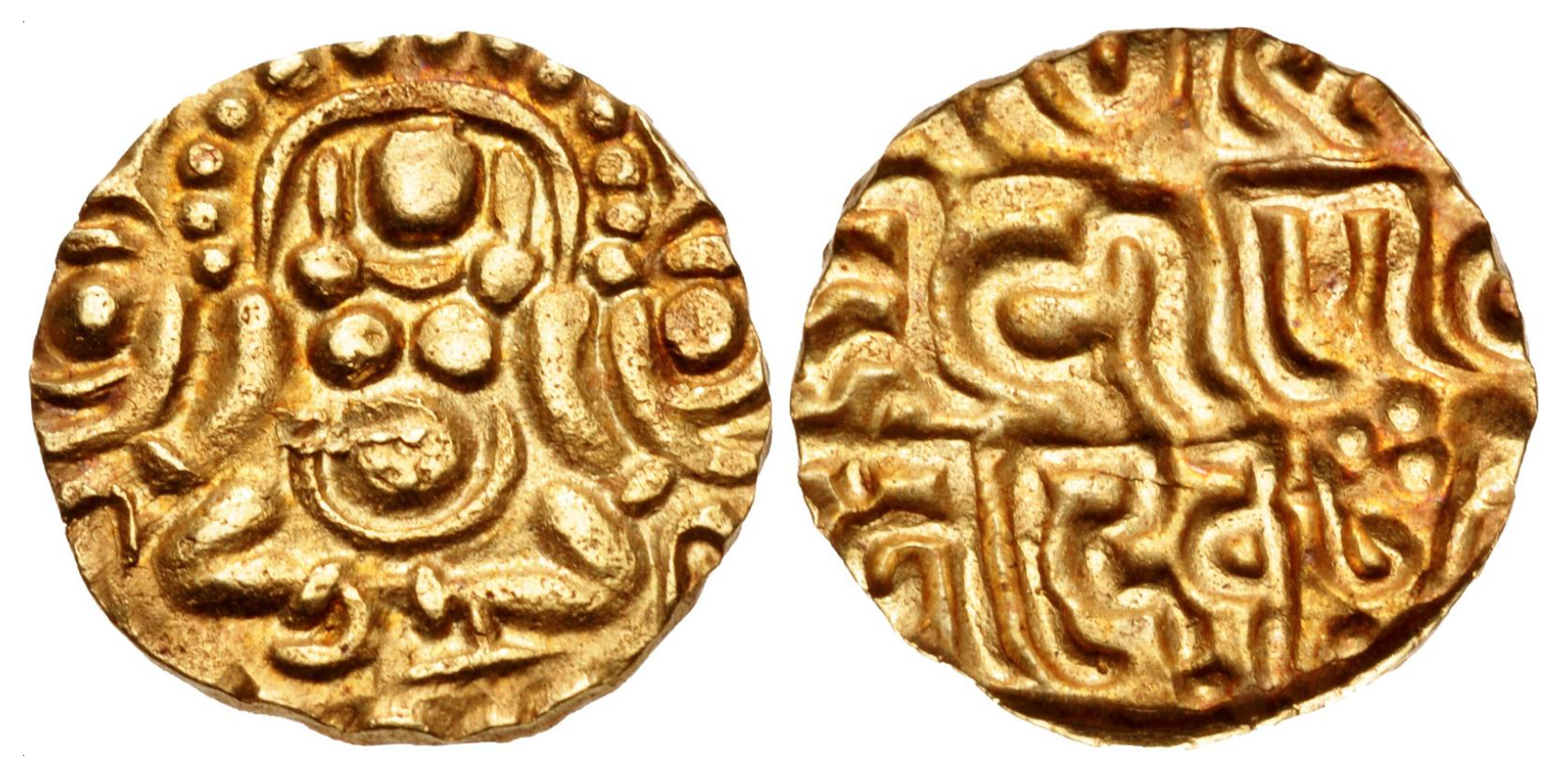
- Coinage of Sallakshana Varman (1120–1135 CE), Chandelas of Jejakabhukti.

Chandela king
- Reign: c. 1100–1110 CE
- Predecessor: Kirttivarman
- Successor: Jayavarman
- Dynasty: Chandela
- Father: Kirttivarman

Sallakshana-Varman (reigned c. 1100–1110 CE; IAST: Sallakṣaṇavarman) was a king of the Chandela dynasty of India. He succeeded his father Kirttivarman as the ruler of the Jejakabhukti region (Bundelkhand in present-day Madhya Pradesh and Uttar Pradesh). The inscriptions of his descendants suggest that he achieved military successes against the Paramaras, the Kalachuris of Tripuri and the ruler of Kanyakubja.

== Military career ==
The partially illegible Mau inscription of Sallakshana's descendant Madana-varman appears to credit him with successful campaigns in "Antarvedi vishaya". Kalhana's writings suggest that Antarvedi was a name for the land between the Ganga and the Yamuna rivers, centered around Kanyakubja (Kannauj). Because of the fragmentary nature of the inscription, different scholars have interpreted it in different ways. Alexander Cunningham believed that Sallakshana's forces merely carried out a brief raid in this region. H. C. Ray speculated that Sallakshana fought with a Kannauj Rashtrakuta prince (possibly Gopala or one of his predecessors) before aborting his campaign. S. K. Mitra theorized that he unsuccessfully tried to capture Kannauj. D. C. Ganguly, on the other hand, proposed that the Chandelas defeated the rulers of Kannauj, which was subsequently ruled by the Gahadavalas. N. S. Bose theorized that the Gahadavalas invaded the Chandela territory; the military success mentioned in the inscription was Sallakshana's repulsion of this attack. According to R. K. Dikshit, the Ghaznavids under Masud III invaded Kannauj region during the reign and defeated the Gahadavalas and their Rashtrakuta feudatories. Taking advantage of this situation, Sallakshana may have captured Antarvedi.

Sallakshana-varman is also mentioned in the Ajaygarh rock inscription of Kalyanidevi, the wife of his descendant Viravarman. According to this inscription, Sallakshana's sword "took away to the fortune of the Malavas and the Chedis. The success against the Malavas may have been a raid against the Paramara king Naravarman. The success against the Chedis (the Kalachuris of Tripuri) was probably refers to an expedition against the Kalachuri king Yashah-Karna."

An inscription of Jajalla-deva, the Kalachuri king of Ratanpur, dated to 1110s CE, states that he was "honoured like a friend" by the ruler of Jejakabhukti. F. Kielhorn identified this Jejakabhukti ruler with Sallakshana's father Kirttivarman. But V. V. Mirashi believed that this ruler was Sallakshana himself, because Jajalla appears to have imitated his copper coins.

== Administration ==
The Mau inscription suggests that Sallakshana-varman was well-versed with arts and literature. It indicates that his father's chief minister Ananta continued to hold the post during his reign. Some sons of Ananta were also appointed to important posts, after having been tested by the king. The Ajaygarh inscription mentions another hereditary minister, Yashahpala of Gauda family.

Sallakshana-varman issued gold and copper coins. Unlike the Chandela inscriptions, these coins mention his name as "Hallakshana-varman" (Srimat-Hallakshana-Varma-Deva). This anomaly can possibly attributed to inefficient minting, although the exact reason is not certain.

A copper-plate inscription of his descendant Paramardi-deva mentions a place called "Sallakshana-Vilasapura". This place was probably named after Sallakshana-Varman, and is identified with the modern Pachar near Jhansi.

Sallakshana-varman was succeeded by Jayavarman.
