= Mrunalini Devi Puar =

Indian educator

Mrunalini Devi Puar (25 June 1931 – 2 January 2015) was an Indian educator and Chancellor of a recognized Indian university with more than 35,000 students. Puar was an educator and Maharani of Dhar State.

== Early life and education ==
She was a member of the Gaekwad dynasty, the former ruling clan of Baroda State and also a member of the Puar dynasty of Dhar, both former Maratha princely states.

A dietician by training, Puar had a B.Sc., Faculty of Home Science, from Maharaja Sayajirao University of Baroda and did her M.S. (food and nutrition) from Iowa State University of Science and Technology in the United States. She later returned to Vadodara, India, to complete her Ph.D. in food and nutrition from Maharaja Sayajirao University of Baroda.

== Career ==
She was chancellor of the Maharaja Sayajirao University of Baroda. She succeeded her brother Fatehsinghrao Gaekwad, Maharaja of Baroda, as chancellor when he died in 1988.

Puar continued the Gaekwad family's tradition of service through education, including as MSU chancellor. Puar, 83, took charge as the chancellor of MSU in 1988. She was the first woman chancellor of a recognized Indian university with more than 35,000 students.

She served as a member of the Commission on Education and Training, the International Union for Conservation of Nature & Natural Resources (IUCNNR), Switzerland and as Chairperson, Food & Nutrition Programme Committee, International Federation For Home Economics (IFHM), France.

She was also a member of the steering group on Nutrition, Planning Commission, Government of India and of the Governing Body, Institute Of Home Economics, New Delhi. She was a member of the advisory committee for Rajiv Gandhi Institute For Contemporary Studies, Rajiv Gandhi Foundation, New Delhi, and a variety of other organisations.

She also taught at The Maharaja Sayajirao University of Baroda for about 12 years before she became its chancellor.

== Personal life ==
She was married to Maharaja Anand Rao IV Puar, the Maharaja of Dhar State.

Hari Singh and Arjun Singh are related to Mrunalini Devi Puar. Their mother, Shashi Prabha Raje is from Dhar and is the daughter of Dhairyashil Rao Puar of Dhar.

== Death ==
Puar died on 2 January 2015 following a short illness. She was 83.

== See also ==
- Gaekwad
