= Vidya Shah =

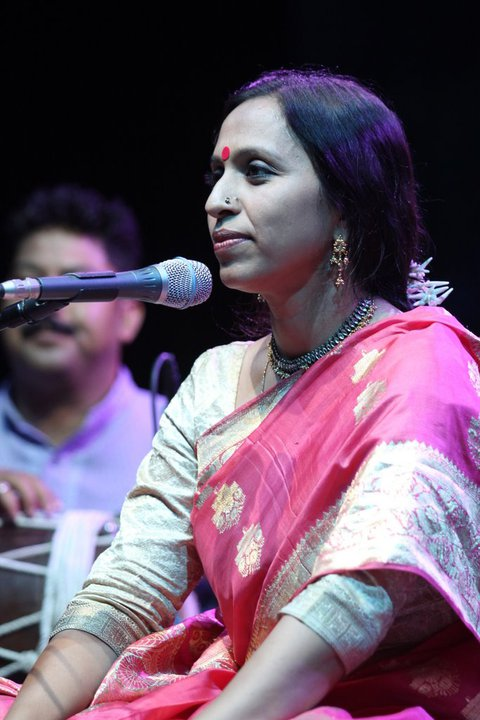

Background information
- Born: Vidya Subramanyam
- Occupation: Singer

Vidya Shah is an Indian singer, musician and writer.

== Early life ==
Shah's family had a significant musical background. With her fondness for and exposure to the North Indian style of classical music, she decided to make a foray into this style of vocal music. She has trained under music icon Shubha Mudgal in Khayal Gayaki and with Shanti Hiranand in Thumri, Dadra and Ghazal. Shah is trained in classical singing.

== Career ==
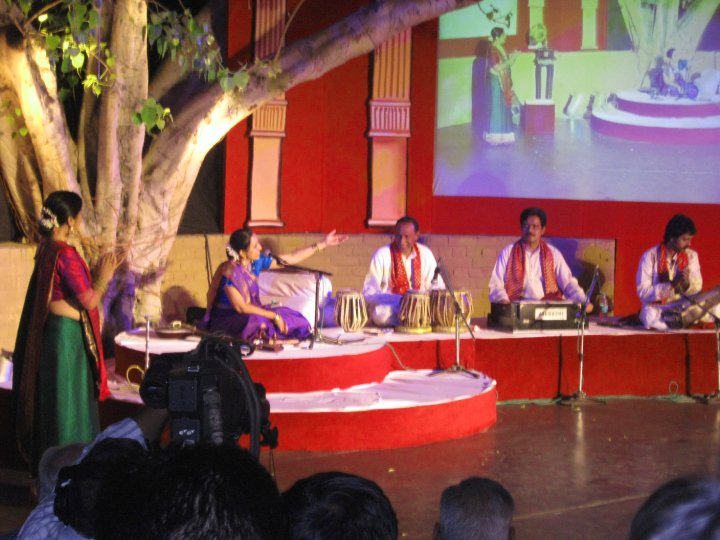
Women on record

Vidya Shah had begun her journey into the world of music at the age of 12 when she started learning South Indian Classical music and as a young Carnatic vocalist, had several concerts to her credit.

Trained initially in Carnatic music, Vidya Shah later received guidance in Khayal from Shubha Mudgal and learnt thumri, dadra and ghazal gayaki from Shanti Hiranand. During her training in Khyal Gayaki under the guidance of her Guru she gained a rich repertoire of Sufi and Bhakti Music. She also experimented with tribal music during a short stint of her stay in a tribal area in Western Madhya Pradesh and developed a flair for folk music.

Besides TV, radio, independent films and documentaries, she has performed on various National and International forums and has worked with International Labels. She has to her credits albums like – Anja (Album Realize), "Far From Home" (Album Medieval Punditz). Her international platforms include Humboldt Forum, the Max Planck Institute in Berlin, Kala Utsav in Singapore, ICCR, in Trinidad and Tobago. In her concert "The Last Mughal" she performed with William Dalrymple. In 2009, she directed a two-day exhibition and music concert 'Women on Record', celebrating Music of women in the Gramophone era, in which she paid a tribute to the iconic female voices of gramophone era by performing their music. In 2014, Shah was the director of Women on Record. A recipient of the Pro Helvetia Residency in 2010, Shah is also a writer and lyricist, and serves as a member of cultural committee of South Asia Foundation.

=== Social Work ===
She started working on social issues in January 1991 with Programme Fellow, Indo-German Social Service Program (IGSSS). Later she worked as an activist with Khedut Mazdoor Chetna Sanghatan (Rights based Trade Union for Agricultural Laborers) Jhabua District in Madhya Pradesh, India. She has been Research Officer with National AIDS Control Organisation (NACO).

She was founder member of Paridhi Research – Rights based women's organisation working on reproductive and sexual health with focus on birth control methods. She has been consultant with Centre for Development Studies, University of Wales, DFID, UK, UNIFEM, UNDP and HIV and Development Office, South and South West Asia for Trafficking and Vulnerability of Women and Girls to HIV/AIDS in India, Nepal and Bangladesh for the United Nations Research Institute of Social Development (UNRISD). She was Programme Co-ordinator with Naz Foundation (India) Trust. She was Director Education in Breakthrough (A Human Rights Organization) and now she serves as a Program Director at her husband's organisation Centre for Media and Alternative Communication CMAC.

== Personal life ==
Vidya Shah is married to designer-photographer Parthiv Shah of ahmedabad. They have a son Anant and daughter Antara.

== Publications ==
- The Challenge of Changing values in Indian Culture: The case of Music; Presented at a Seminar organised by INTACH and Nakshband Educational Trust, IIC, 15 March, New Delhi Published in the South Asia Foundation Quarterly, April 2008;
- My Body is Not Mine: Book on the MSM community and rights violations across 6 states in India in collaboration with the Naz Foundation International, supported by DFID-PMO, November 2008
- Technical Paper on Gender, Vulnerabilities and HIV/AIDS for the UNIFEM South Asian Regional Office, New Delhi, January 2003
- Layers of Silence on Cross Border Trafficking and Women's vulnerability to HIV/AIDS, for the UNRISD Project on HIV and Development, 2002
- Brokered Livelihood: Debt, labour migration and Development in Tribal Western India in Labor Mobility in Rural Society, edited by Ben Rogaly and Arjaan de Haan, Published by Frank Cass Publishers, UK, 2002
- Strength in Action: An Educators Guide on Preventing Domestic Violence, Breakthrough, 2004
- Talking HIV and Gender: Media and Messaging a Hand book; Women's Feature Service and UNIFEM, 2006

== Discography ==
- Anja (Realize)
- Far From Home (Medieval Punditz)
- Ahsana Om Shanti (Six Degrees and Times Music).
- Har Mann Mein Aman for the National Commission for Women
- Ham se Zameen aur Aasman for the Ministry of Youth Affairs
- In January 2008 she released her latest CD, Hum Sab

== Other projects ==
- Creative Consultant: "The World in the Balance" For PBS; Directed by Sarah Holt; Executive Producers Linda Harrar for WGBH; 2004
- Editor "People Plus" a book on the lives of HIV positive people, UNAIDS India, 2001
- Creative writer For Women's day campaign, 2001 for Ministry of Women and Child Welfare and Centre for Media and Alternative Communication (CMAC), March 2001
- Consultant in an advocacy project on "Peace and Equality" for National Commission for Women (NCW) December 1999
- Script and Research For a documentary film on Visual Anthropology, Doordarshan, National television channel, 1997–98
- Editor Paper on 'Lacquer work in India' for a UNESCO workshop in Myanmar, UNESCO, 1996 and Paper on 'Basic Education in India' for a UNESCO conference in India, UNESCO 1995
