= J. S. Rajput =

Indian educator and writer

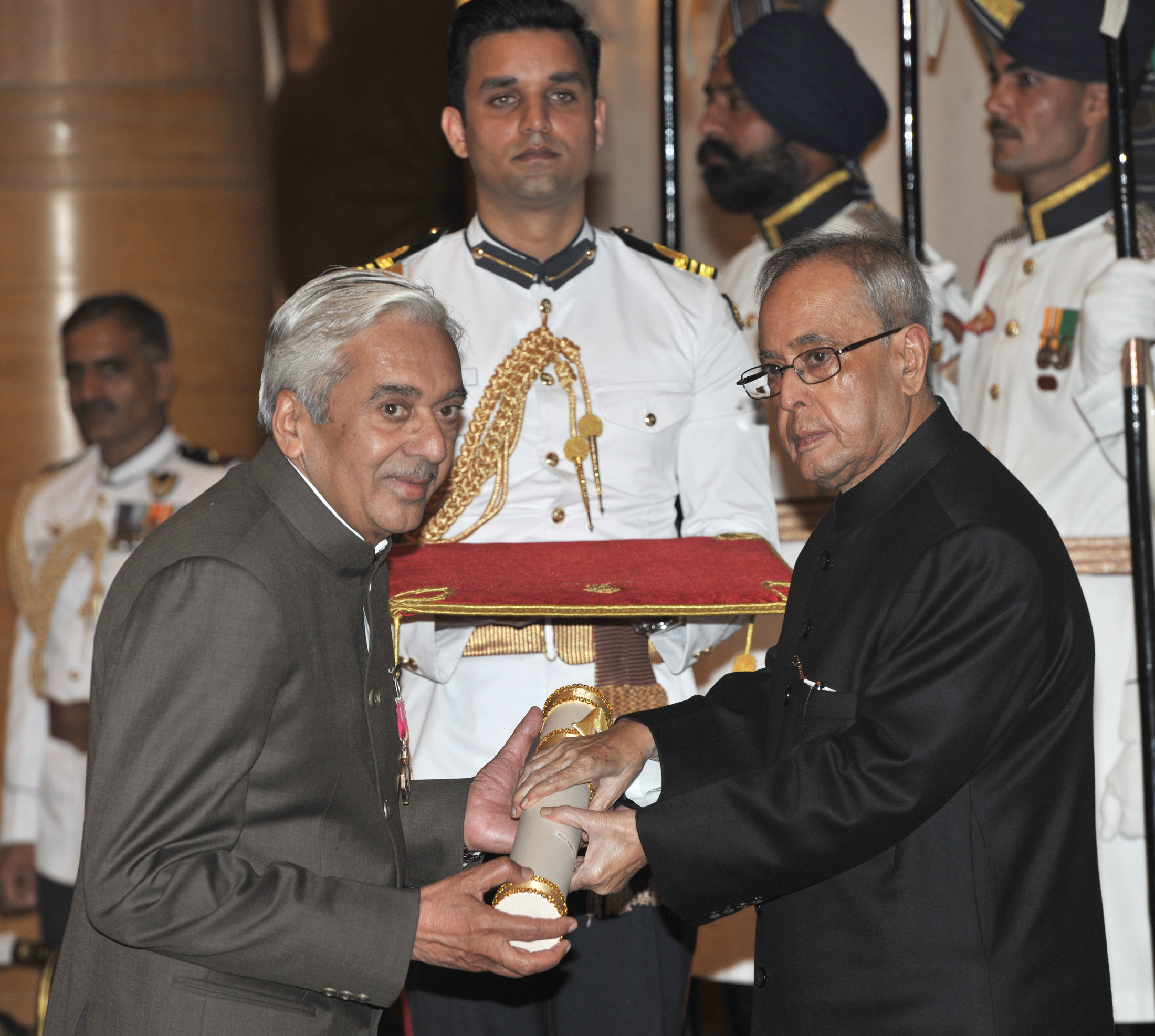
- The President, Shri Pranab Mukherjee presenting the Padma Shri Award to Prof. Jagmohan Singh Rajput, at a Civil Investiture Ceremony, at Rashtrapati Bhavan, in New Delhi on April 08, 2015.
- Born: India
- Occupations: Educationist; Writer
- Known for: Educational reforms NCERT
- Awards: Padma Shri; UNESCO Jan Amos Comenius Medal; Maharshi Veda Vyas Award

J. S. Rajput is an Indian educationist, writer and the former director of the National Council of Educational Research and Training. After his stint as a professor at the Regional Institute of Education, Bhopal during 1974–77, he served as the principal of the institution till 1988 when he was appointed as Joint Adviser on Education to the Ministry of Human Resource Development, a post he held till 1994. When the National Council for Teacher Education (NCTE) was established in 1994, he was made the founder chairman of the council where he served until his move in 1999 to the National Council of Educational Research and Training (NCERT) as its director. He superannuated from service in 2004 and during his tenure as the head of NCERT, it was reported that he brought in regulations in BEd education by distance education method and introduced a two-year BEd course.

Rajput has published several articles and books on physics and education in English and Hindi languages; Encyclopaedia of Indian Education (2 volumes), Education in a changing world: fallacies and forces, Contemporary Concerns in Education, Universalisation of Elementary Education: Role of Teacher Education, and Teacher Education in India are some of the notable ones. UNESCO honored him with Jan Amos Comenius Medal in 2004 for his contributions to educational reforms in India and he received the Maharshi Veda Vyas Award of the Government of Madhya Pradesh in 2010. The Government of India awarded him the fourth highest civilian honour of the Padma Shri, in 2015, for his contributions to literature and education.

== Selected bibliography ==
English

- J. S. Rajput; Narendera Vaidya (1975). The Individually Accelerated Science Teacher Education Project. Regional College of Education.
- J. S. Rajput (1 January 1994). Experience and Expectations in Elementary Education. Anamika Prakashan. ISBN 978-81-85150-27-7.
- J.S. Rajput (January 1994). Universalisation of Elementary Education: Role of Teacher Education. S.Chand and Company. p. 339. ISBN 978-0706984651.
- J. S. Rajput (February 1999). Education in a changing world: fallacies and forces. Vikas Pub. House. ISBN 9788125906575.
- J. S. Rajput; K. Walia (1 January 2002). Teacher Education in India. Sterling Publishers Pvt. Ltd. ISBN 978-81-207-2378-8.
- J. S. Rajput; National Council of Educational Research and Training (India) (2004). Global educational change: a compendium of international documents. National Council of Educational Research and Training. ISBN 978-81-7450-324-4.
- J.S. Rajput (2004). Reforms In School Education. Prabhat Prakashan. p. 155. ISBN 978-8188322541.
- J. S. Rajput; National Council of Educational Research and Training (India) (2004). Encyclopaedia of Indian Education: L-Z. NCERT. ISBN 978-81-7450-304-6.
- J.S. Rajput (2006). Human Values And Education. Pragun Publication. ISBN 978-8189645434.
- J. S. Rajput (1 January 2009). Contemporary Concerns in Education. Yash Publications. ISBN 978-81-89537-71-5.
- J.S. Rajput (10 November 2012). Seven Social Sins: The Contemporary Relevance. Allied Publishers. ISBN 978-81-8424-798-5.
- J.S. Rajput (January 2013). Oyster of Wisdom. Yash Publications. ASIN B00FB0GU1C.
- J.S. Rajput (2015). Lala Lajpat Rai's Political, Economic, Social and Cultural Life. ISBN 978-9350321072.

Hindi

- J. S. Rajput (2008). Kyoṃ tanāvagrasta hai śikshā-vyavasthā?. Kitabghar Prakashan. ISBN 978-81-89859-66-4.
- J.S. Rajput (2010). Samvet Khuch Chuni Kahaniya or Kavitaye. Neha Publishers. ISBN 978-8189537937.
- J.S. Rajput (2013). Sakshis Parivartno Ki Parak. Yash Publications. ASIN B00FB0HJ9Y.

== See also ==
- National Council of Educational Research and Training
- National Council for Teacher Education
