= Jugirkanda =

Village in Barisal District, Bangladesh

Coordinates: 22°51′N 90°10′E

Jugirkanda is a village in Otra Union of Wazirpur Upazila, Barisal District in Bangladesh. Its inhabitants have many different professions including farmers and fishermen. Jugirkanda has only one bazaar named Galar Hat. Galar Hat is south of Gazi Bari. The village has two government primary schools, one madrassa named Abdur Rab Alia Madrasa, and two high schools and one of them is girls' school. The Sandha river is south of Jugirkanda. The postalcode is 8222.
