= Rashida Bee =

Indian activist from Bhopal

- Awards: Goldman Environmental Prize (2004)

Rashida Bee is an Indian activist from Bhopal. She was awarded the Goldman Environmental Prize in 2004, together with Champa Devi Shukla. The two have struggled for justice for the surviving victims of the 1984 Bhopal disaster, when 20,000 people were killed, and organized campaigns and trials against those responsible for the disaster.

== Bhopal gas tragedy ==
Rashida Bee along with Champa Devi Shukla, both survivors of the infamous Bhopal gas tragedy in 1984, led an international campaign against Dow Chemical and its subsidiary Union Carbide and to get justice for the victims of that December night. In 1999, along with other victims, they filed a class-action lawsuit against Union Carbide. In 2002, they organised a 19-day hunger strike in New Delhi, demanding that the former Union Carbide CEO Warren Anderson face a criminal trial in Bhopal. They also called for Dow to provide long-term health care for survivors and their children, clean up the former Union Carbide site, and supply economic support to survivors who can no longer work due to illness.

== Awards ==
On the 20th anniversary of the Bhopal Gas Tragedy, in 2004, Bee and Shukla received the Goldman Environmental Prize awarded in a ceremony in San Francisco, California, on 19 April. Bee used the award money to open Chingari Trust, a trust to provide medical help to children born with defects. It has registered 300 children up to 12 years old. Space constraints, however, only allow them to accommodate 60 children a day. The centre has a speech therapist, physiotherapist, special educators and doctors. The trust also provides employment for people who cannot work because of sickness.

== Personal life ==
Bee works at the Central Government Press, where she is a junior binder.
