= Bagra, Dhaka =

Bagra
- Village
- Location of Bagra, Bangladesh
- Coordinates: 22°52′N 90°09′E
- Country: Bangladesh
- Division: Dhaka Division
- Time zone: UTC+6 (BST)

Bagra (also, Bāgra) is a village in Dhaka Division, Bangladesh.
