= Anand Rai =

Indian whistleblower (born 1977)

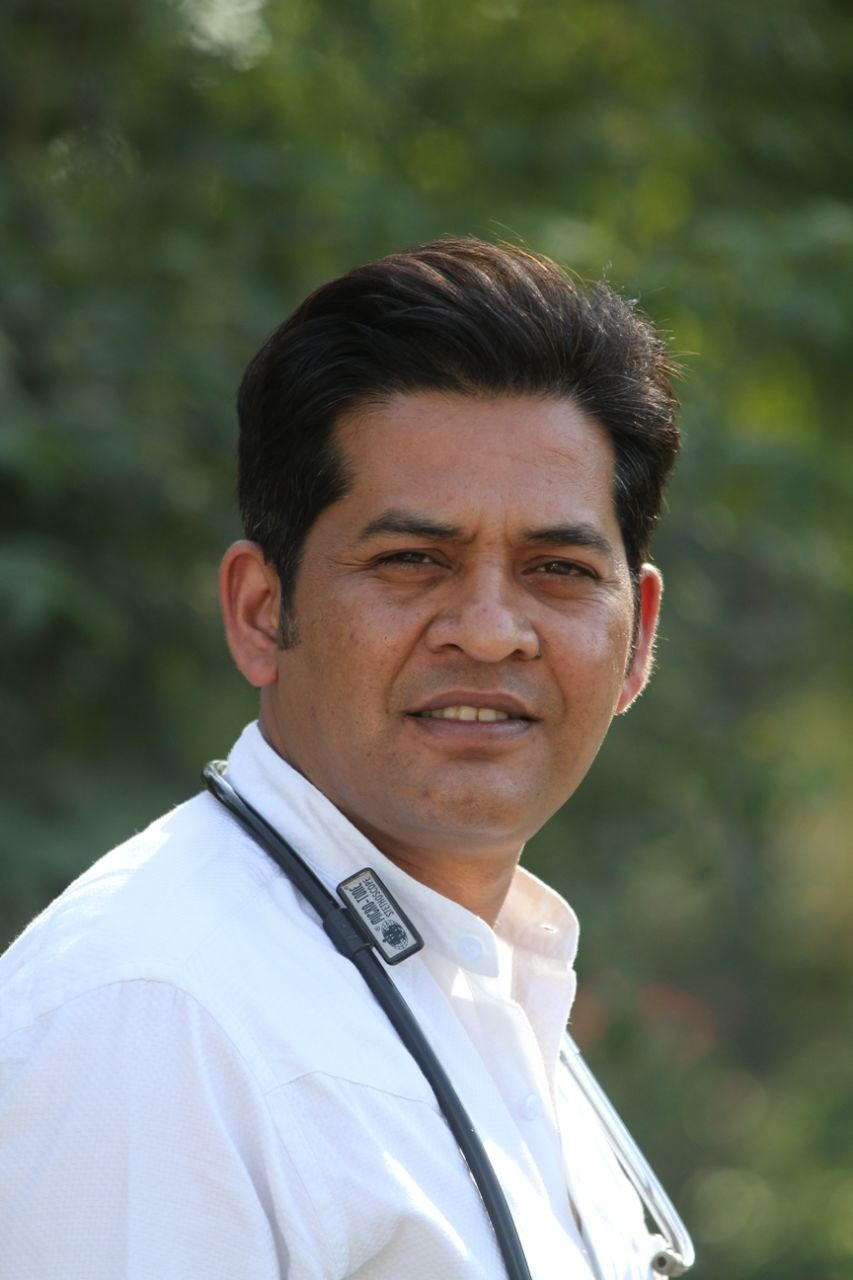
- Born: 1 January 1977 (age 49); Mahendragaon, Harda, Madhya Pradesh, India
- Occupation: Ophthalmologist
- Awards: Madhya Pradesh Foundation Award 2015

Anand Rai is best known as whistleblower for exposing the Vyapam scam. The Madhya Pradesh Professional Examination Board (MPPEB), also known by its Hindi acronym "Vyapam", is responsible for conducting several examinations that are used to select candidates for educational institutes and government jobs. A nexus of politicians, MPPEB officials and middlemen carried out massive irregularities in these exams, allowing undeserving candidates to be selected.

== Early life ==
He was born in a small village Mahendragaon in Harda district of Madhya Pradesh to the family of a school teacher. He had been a member of Bharatiya Janata Party (BJP), and was active in Rashtriya Swayamsevak Sangh (RSS) activities from 2005 to 2013.

== Vyapam scam ==
Rai attended the MGM Medical College in Indore from 2003 to 2007. There, he noticed several irregularities that allowed the children of bureaucrats and politicians to do well despite not attending classes or exams. He became suspicious in 2005 when he attended his MD exams and found that many of the top qualified students were from the same hostel block. At that time, he did not raise the issue as he was a junior. He then visited the state capital Bhopal to alert the government authorities. According to him, he saw a junior doctor Deepak Yadav and others manipulating medical exam forms, which made him suspect a scam. In 2008, he met his batchmate Jadgish Sagar (later found to be the kingpin of the Vyapam scam) at the wedding of a common friend. Sagar had left a suitcase at the wedding venue. When he did not return for a long time, Rai opened the suitcase to look for Sagar's contact information. In the suitcase, he found several Pre-Medical Test (PMT) admission forms and photographs.

After finishing his post-graduation, Rai joined the college as a faculty member. In 2009, he decided to expose the irregularities in the medical exams, and filed a complaint with MPPEB. The board formed a committee to investigate the matter and discovered that 280 proxy candidates had impersonated the actual candidates in the exams.

Rai believed the scam to be much bigger, and suspected involvement of politicians and bureaucrats in it. After having filed repeated complaints and receiving no response, finally he filed a Public Interest Litigation requesting investigation into the scam in July 2013. The subsequent investigation, led by a Special Investigation Team (SIT), resulted in arrests of several politicians including the state's former education minister. He also filed a petition in Supreme Court of India to hand over the investigation of DMAT scam, a private medical college admission scam. Since 2005, he has filed more than 1000 RTI applications, including the clinical drug trials with the Drug Controller General of India (DGCI).

== 2015 Transfer ==
On 20 July 2015, the Government transferred him from the health department's training institute in Indore to Dhar. Rai alleged that he was being hounded for complaining against Verma, and stated that he would challenge the transfer in court. Rai filed an affidavit in the High court and alleged that Chief Minister Shivraj Singh Chouhan had asked him to stop the campaign against Vyapam scam and DMAT scam. In return, his transfer orders will be cancelled. The court then granted one week to the state government to file the counter affidavit. However, on 18 September 2015, the government cancelled the transfer orders without filing any reply.
