= Bagra, Haripur =

Coordinates: 33°58′0″N 73°4′0″E

Bagra
- Town and union council
- Interactive map of Bagra
- Country: Pakistan
- Region: Khyber-Pakhtunkhwa
- District: Haripur
- Time zone: UTC+5 (PST)

Bagra is one of the 44 union councils of Haripur District in Khyber-Pakhtunkhwa province of Pakistan. It is located southeast of the district capital, Haripur.
