= Shehla Masood =

Indian environmentalist

- Born: 1973; Bhopal, Madhya Pradesh, India
- Died: 2011 (aged 38); Bhopal, Madhya Pradesh, India
- Occupations: Environmentalist, RTI activist

Shehla Masood (1973–2011) was an Indian environmentalist, wildlife and Right to Information activist.

== Work ==
Masood was the secretary of NGO Udai and ran an event management company called 'Miracles'. She started the NGO in 2009, venturing into RTI activism, tiger and forest conservation. Masood was an activist working primarily on wildlife conservation, and also supported other causes like good governance, RTI Act, Police reforms, environment, women's rights & issues and transparency. She sat on a fast in support of Anna Hazare's India Against Corruption campaign. She was actively involved in raising issues related to the deaths of tigers in the various sanctuaries of Madhya Pradesh. Shehla was working for the Shyama Prasad Mukherjee Trust, organising events for them from Srinagar to Kolkata to Delhi. She co-founded RTI Anonymous, a service for whistle blowers for filing anonymous Right to Information (RTI) Applications with Indian Government departments without getting victimised, with her friends just a few days before her death.

== Death ==
Masood had asked for details about Narmada Samagraha, an NGO backed by the BJP Rajya Sabha MP. She was about to leave for Boat Club in Bhopal to join the anti-government protest to bring the Jan Lokpal Bill when she was killed. On 16 August 2011 at around 11:19 AM, she was shot by an unidentified assailant in front of her house in Bhopal from point blank range. Masood was about to leave in her car when she was shot in the driver's seat, by three persons who were hired by a local female interior designer.

According to Police, the motive of the killing remains unknown. However, as per media, the possible cause could be her RTI activities and for protesting illegal diamond mining done by Rio Tinto in connivance with government officers and fighting to save tigers, leopards and forests, who were killed for their skins in connivance with forest officers

In an indication of the seriousness of this high-profile murder, for which no arrests were made in the initial days, the Government of Madhya Pradesh transferred the case to the Central Bureau of Investigation.

On 28 February 2012 Central Bureau of Investigation claims to have cracked the case and arrested a Bhopal-based interior designer Zahida Parvez and three accomplices who were hired to kill Masood. The interior designer's employee and friend who presumably had information about the murder plan was arrested on 2 March 2012. The interior designer had given the contract to Bhopal-based criminal Saqib 'Danger', known for his connections with the local BJP party in Madhya Pradesh, who further contracted it to Tabish (his cousin) based in Kanpur. The vehicle used in the getaway has been found. One of the accused arrested named Irfan had said that he did not shoot Masood but his colleague Shanu did. However, further investigation revealed when cousin of Bhopal builder Saqib 'Danger' Tabish was arrested that Shanu did not shoot Masood it was Irfan who did. Zahida and Irfan have recorded their statements in front of the CBI Magistrate. Meanwhile, the murder weapon has been found and has been sent for forensic testing. The motive behind the murder as pointed by the CBI is Zahida was obsessed and very close with a Bhopal BJP MLA Dhruv Narayan Singh. . Zahida decided to eliminate Masood. Some of the diary contents recovered by the CBI from Zahida's office reveal this motive. Later CBI gives clean chit to Dhruv Narayan Singh due to lack of evidence against him.

Masood was constantly living under threat, as revealed by her in an interview before she was shot dead.

== Trial ==
On 28 January 2017, CBI court in Bhopal convicted four people for murder and criminal conspiracy for the murder of Masood. Another accused was pardoned because he turned approver.

== Awards ==
Masood was posthumously awarded with the SR Jindal “Crusade Against Corruption” award.

== See also ==
- Attacks on RTI Activist in India
