= Lilatai Pradkar =

Indian social reformer (born 1925)

Lilatai Pradkar (born February 1925) is an Indian social reformer who fought for education of tribal women and empowerment. She was born in Madhya Pradesh.

== Early life ==
Pradkar obtained M.A and B.Ed. degrees, then chose teaching as her profession and remained as a teacher for three decades. Besides establishing in 1975 the Vanabasi Kalyan Ashram for Women in Raigarh to offer vocational training, she recognized the need of tribal girl students to have boarding and lodging facilities and so she started 1990 the Nivedita Vanabasi Kanya Chhatravas. She took retirement and worked full-time on educating the tribal peoples of Madhya Pradesh. She received together with four other women the Stree Shakti Puraskar award for 1999.
