= Bhakti Yadav =

Indian doctor

- Born: 3 April 1926; Mahidpur, Ujjain, Madhya Pradesh, British Raj
- Died: 14 August 2017 (aged 91); Indore, Madhya Pradesh, India
- Other names: Doctor didi
- Occupation: Gynaecologist.
- Known for: Free treatment of patients since 1948
- Awards: Padma Shri award recipient

Bhakti Yadav (3 April 1926 – 14 August 2017) was an Indian doctor who was the first female MBBS from Indore, India and she was recognised by being awarded one of India's highest civilian honors, Padma Shri. She was known for her generosity, including offering free treatment since 1948. She was a gynaecologist.

== Early life ==
She was born on 3 April 1926 in Ujjain in Mahidpur. She hailed from a renowned Maharashtrian family. In 1937 when education of girls was discouraged, she expressed her desire for higher studies. Her father sent her to a nearby village where she got to study till the seventh standard. Thereafter her father visited Indore to get her admitted in Ahilya Ashram School, the only girls' school in Indore in those times. The school had boarding facilities. After her 11th standard, in 1948, she joined Hollkar Science College, Indore for her BSc studies. She was topper in the college in the first year.

== Medical education ==
She did her MBBS from Mahatma Gandhi Memorial Medical College (MGM) where she got admitted based on her credible results for the 11th standard. Among the total of 40 MBBS students, she was the only female. Bhakti was the first female student of the first batch of MGM Medical College's MBBS students. Upon her graduation as 1952 she also became the first MBBS doctor from central India. She also did her MS from MGM Medical College.

== Work ==
She rejected job offers from the government to work in Nandalal Bhandari Maternity Home to treat the wives of poor mill workers. She started the Vatsalya Nursing Home with her husband CS Yadav at her residence. It is looked after by Chetan M Yadav, her son and Sunita Yadav, her daughter-in-law. Yadav conducted 1.5 lakhs operations including 70,000 normal deliveries. She treated about a thousand women patients without charging them any fees.

== Death ==
She died at her home on 14 August 2017. She was suffering from osteoporosis and other age related ailments. Over the past few months she was continuously losing weight.
