= Bagra, Chittagong =

Bagra
- Village
- Location of Bagra, Bangladesh
- Coordinates: 23°40′N 91°09′E
- Country: Bangladesh
- Division: Chittagong Division
- Time zone: UTC+6 (BST)

Bagra (also, Bāgra) is a village in Chittagong Division, Bangladesh.
