= N. J. Rao =

Dr. N. J. Rao
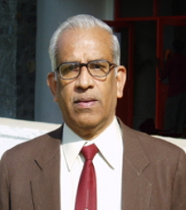
- Education: M.Tech, Ph.D
- Occupation: Vice Chancellor
- Known for: Jaypee University of Engineering & Technology
- Website: njrao.org

N. J. Rao was an Indian chemical engineer.

== Education ==
Rao did B.Tech (Hons.) and M.Tech in Chemical Engineering from IIT Kharagpur and Ph.D. in Chemical Engineering from University of Roorkee.

== Work ==
Rao served over 34 years at IIT Roorkee / University of Roorkee at Chemical Engineering Department and Department of Paper Technology. He worked for several years as Director of Institute of Paper Technology. He was the Director of Central Pulp and Paper Research Institute, a national laboratory under Ministry of Industry (GOI) for one year. His research interest includes Energy and Environmental management of Process industries, particularly Pulp and Paper Fluid - Particle Mechanics. He published over 160 research papers and 8 Ph.D. scholars got their degrees under his guidance. He had several awards for best papers and best teacher and was associated with several National and International bodies like UNEP(NIEM), CPCB, NPC, MOEF, DST, CSE, HNL, Shreyans Industries Ltd., WBCSD, IL & FS and has visited many countries like China, France, UK, Norway, Sweden, Finland, Germany, Canada, Thailand, Vietnam, Indonesia. He was a visiting professor at NTH Trondheim (Norway). He served as Editor / Editorial Advisor / National Editor for IPPTA Journal; CSIR Journal, In Paper International, Pulp and Paper International, Urja.
He was the Vice Chancellor of Jaypee University of Engineering and Technology, Raghogarh for 12 years.

== Death ==
He died on 15 July 2019.
