= Bagra Tawa railway station =

Railway station in Madhya Pradesh, India

Bagra Tawa

General information
- Location: Bagra Tawa, Narmadapuram district, Madhya Pradesh; India
- Coordinates: 22°37′55″N 77°59′39″E
- Elevation: 337 metres (1,106 ft)
- System: Indian Railways station
- Owner: Indian Railways
- Operator: West Central Railway
- Line: Jabalpur–Bhusaval section
- Platforms: 2
- Tracks: 2

Construction
- Structure type: Standard (on ground)
- Parking: No
- Cycle facilities: No

Other information
- Status: Functioning
- Station code: BGTA
- Zone(s): West Central Railway
- Division(s): Jabalpur
Location
- Location within India Location within Madhya Pradesh

Bagra Tawa railway station is a railway station in Narmadapuram district, Madhya Pradesh. Its code is BGTA. It serves Bagra Tawa village. The station consists of two platforms serviced by passenger and express trains.
