= Prithvi-deva II =

- Maharaja

7th Ratnapura Kalachuri king
- Reign: 1135–1165 CE
- Predecessor: Ratnadeva II (1120–1135 CE)
- Successor: Jajalla-deva II (1165–1168 CE)
- Father: Ratnadeva II (1120–1135 CE)
- Religion: Hinduism

Prithvi-deva II was one of the most powerful Ratnapura Kalachuri kings, who ruled over the present-day Indian state of Chhattisgarh. His reign is placed 1135–1165 CE.

== Reign ==
The Chindaka Nagas of Chakrakota had allied themselves with the Gangas of Orissa, enemies of the Kalachuris. In retaliation, Prithvideva II devastated Chakrakota and destroyed the Chindaka Naga capital, in an attempt to terrorise the Ganga king Anantavarman. The Bilaigarh copper plates inscription of Prithvideva reads- "His son Prithvîdëva (II) of well-known fame, who has planted his lotus-like foot on the rows of hostile princes' heads, has become the lord of kings — (he) who, by devastating Chakrakota, overwhelmed the illustrious Ganga king with anxiety in regard to the crossing of the ocean which was the sole means (of saving his life)."

Similar to his predecessor and father, Ratnadeva II, who had defeated the powerful Eastern Ganga king Anantavarman Chodaganga, Prithvideva II defeated an Eastern Ganga king, Karmadeva VII. Karmadeva VII suffered a crushing defeat against him. The Tripuri Kalachuri king, Jayasimha, unsuccessfully tried to assert his authority over Prithvi-deva II (if Jayasimha carried out the campaign in his early reign). A battle was fought at Shivrinarayan, in which Jayasimha seems to have suffered a defeat.

== Bilaigarh copper plates of Prithvi-deva II ==
Two copper-plate grant plates were discovered in 1945 at Bilaigarh, the chief town of the former Bilaigarh Zamindarî, in the Raipur District of the Chhattisgarh Division in Madhya Pradesh. It goes as follows-

English Translation Success ! Ôm ! Adoration to Brahman !

- (Veise.1) - Adoration to that reality Brahman, which is attributeless, all-pervasive, eternal and auspicious, the ultimate cause (of the universe) and supreme light conceivable by the mind.
- (V. 2) The foremost luminary of the firmament is the sun, the Primeval Being. Then was born from him his son Manu, the first of kings. In his family there was Kârtavïrya born on the earth.
- (V.3) - There was the king, the divine and illustrious Kârtavîtya, an ornament of the earth, who threw into bondage Râvana who had propitiated Siva with the embrace of (Parvati) the daughter of the Himalaya, who was terrified as he (the Râvana) lifted up the (Kailâsa) mountain with ease, and who (i.e., Râvana) was greatly enraged when his offerings to the three-eyed (Siva), were washed away by the stream of the greatly flooded Rëvâ which was turned by the suddenly placed dam of his mighty arms.
- (V. 4) - The king born in his family became known on the earth as Haihayas. An ornament of their family was that illustrious Kôkkala (I) endowed with all excellences who laid the fire of distress in the minds of (his) enemies, who accumulated fame after (amassing) the fortune of religious contemplation, (and) who was always dear to good people (as) one who made them happy.
- (V. 5) - He had eighteen very valiant sons, who destroyed their enemies even as lions break open the frontal globes of elephants. The eldest of them, an excellent prince, became the lord of Tripuri and he made his brothers the lords of mandalas by his side.
- (V. 6) - In the family of a younger brother of these there was born Kalingaraja who exterminated hostile kings with the fire of his valour and who was to the faces of the wives of the great warriors even as the full moon is to day-lotuses.
- (V. 7)- From him also there was born a son who became famous by the name of Kamalarâja (and appeared) lovely with his far-spreading spotless glory. When the sun of his valour rose, the assemblages of lotuses bloomed even at night.
- (V. 8) - Thereafter he begot Ratnarâja (I), whose face was like the moon, and who acquired a mass of religious merit by obliging the (whole) world; (and) who, destroying (his) enemies by the valour of the pair of his arms, spread (his) fame in the three worlds.
- (V. 9) - (His wife) named Nônallâ was dear to him as valour is to a brave person. Their son was Prithvîdëva (I), the best of kings.
- (V. 10) - The son of the queen Râjallâ, begotten by Prithvïdëva (I), was the brave king Jâjalladëva (I), the wish-fulfilling tree, bearing the fruit of fortune, which yielded their desired objects to good people, — (he) who was wont to worship ail gods; who was (annoying like) a thorn to his fierce foes, and the god of love incarnate to the extremely lovely ladies who saw him.
- (Verse.11)- His son Prithvîdëva (II) of well-known fame, who has planted his lotus-like foot on the rows of hostile princes' heads, has become the lord of kings — (he) who, by devastating Chakrakota, overwhelmed the illustrious Ganga king with anxiety in regard to the crossing of the ocean which was the sole means (of saving his life).
- (V. 12) - In the family of the sage Vatsa there was born formerly a Bràhmana named Hâpûka of great renown who, being foremost among those learned in the Vëdas, became dear to the world and possessed blameless prosperity, being smeared by whose glory, which in colour was as it were akin to powdered camphor and liquid sandal paste, the surface of the firmament shone all round.
- (V. 13) - He had a well-known son named Jîmûtavâhana, who by his life sanctified the earth, and attracted prosperity by his merits, and in whose case the goddess of fortune herself gave up her natural fickleness.
- (V. 14) - To him was born a wise son named Dëlhûka who has an intellect proficient in Vedântic principles and matchlessly radiant in regard to Smritis. Clever and noble as he is, his greatness is for obliging the (whole) world.
- (V. 15) - Having learnt (from him) the Sakambhari vidyà, which is incomparable in all the worlds and having defeated his enemies with ease in the forefront of the battle Brahmadëva, the well-known feudatory (of Prithvïdêva II) regards him highly as the sole match for (Brihaspati) the preceptor of gods
- (V. 16) - Prithvîdëva (II) granted him the village Paṇḍaratalāī in the Ēvaḍi mandala on the occasion of a solar eclipse.
- (V. 17) - Those, who will be born in this family should confirm this copper (charter) so long as the serpent (Shesha) supports the earth with a thousand pillar-like hoods.
- (V.18) - Whoever may hereafter be a king or a minister should also protect with care this religious gift of mine.

(Here follow four benedictive and imprecatory verses)

- (V.23) - This prasasti incised on copper (plates) was composed by the illustrious Malhaṇa, the son of Śubhankara, who being well read is a bee on the lotuses in the form of poets and has used words with splendid significance in a large number of prabandhas (works).
- (V.24) - These excellent copper-plates were prepared by Vâmana, written by a son of Kîrti, and incised by a son of Lakshmidhara.

The year 896 . . Seal

The King, the illustrious Prithvîdëva. Bilaigarh Plates of Prrithvideva II : Kalachuri year 896 (1144 AD)
