= Kalachuris of Ratnapura =

Central Indian dynasty (c. 1000–1758)

- 11th century–1758
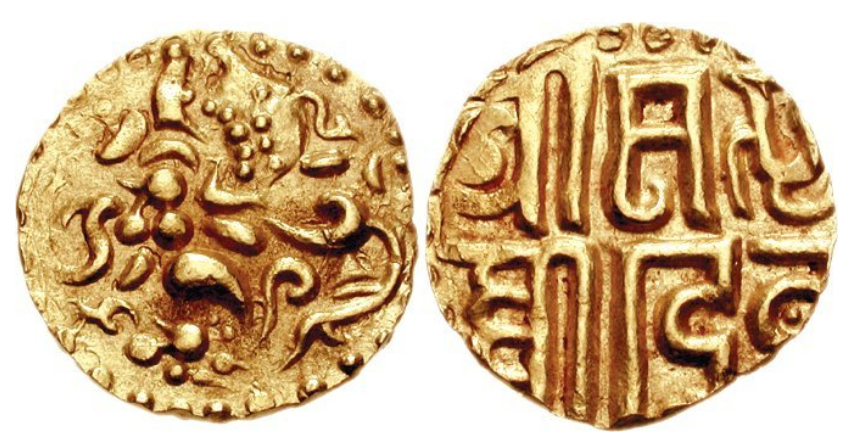
- Coinage of the Kalachuris of Ratnapura. Gold coin of Prithvi Deva, c. 1079.

- Location of the Kalachuris of Ratnapura and neighbouring South Asian polities in 1175, on the eve of the Ghurid Empire invasion of the subcontinent.
- Capital: Ratnapura
- Religion: Jainism; Hinduism
- Government: monarchy
- History
  - Conquest of Dakshina Kosala by Kalinga-raja: 11th century
  - Bimbaji Bhonsle becomes governor of Chhattisgarh: 1758
Preceded by	Succeeded by
Kalachuris of Tripuri; Somavamshi dynasty	Maratha Empire
- Today part of: India

The Kalachuris of Ratnapura, also known as the Haihayas of Ratanpur, were a dynasty that ruled in Central India during the 12th and 13th centuries. They ruled parts of present-day Chhattisgarh from their capital at Ratnapura (modern Ratanpur in Bilaspur district). They were an offshoot of the Kalachuris of Tripuri, and ruled as vassals of the parent dynasty for many years.

The Ratnapura branch was established by Kalinga-raja around 1000 CE. His descendants became independent towards the end of the 11th century, and fought with their neighbours to consolidate their rule, including the Eastern Gangas. Pratapa-malla, the last confirmed descendant of Kalinga-raja, ruled in the early 13th century. No information is available about his immediate successors, but towards the end of the 14th century, the family appears to have split into two branches, with their capitals at Ratanpur and Raipur respectively. Vahara, the 15th-16th- century king of Ratanpur, can be identified with Bahar Sahai, to whom the later rulers of Ratanpur traced their ancestry. The Ratanpur kingdom accepted the suzerainty of the Maratha Nagpur Kingdom in 1740 and was annexed by that kingdom after the death of its last ruler, Mohan Singh.

== Origin ==
The kingdom originated as the eastern province of the Kalachuri or Chedi kingdom, which was centered in the upper Narmada River valley. According to inscriptions, the Tripuri Kalachuri king Kokalla I had 18 sons, the eldest of whom succeeded him on the throne of Tripuri. The younger ones became rulers of mandalas (feudatory governors). The Ratnapuri Kalachuris descended from one of these younger sons. The new branch was established by Kalingaraja around 1000 CE. By the eleventh century the Ratnapura branch became independent, as per Prof Ramaswamy iyangar kalachuris were originally Jain rulers.

== Political history ==
Several inscriptions and coins of the Ratnapura branch have been found, but these do not provide enough information to reconstruct the political history of the region with complete certainty.

Kalinga-raja conquered the Dakshina Kosala region from the Somavamshi dynasty, and established the Ratnapura kingdom around 1000 CE. He made Tummana (near modern-day Bilaspur) his capital. He was succeeded by Kamala-raja; his grandson Ratna-deva I established Ratnapura (modern Ratanpur). The inscriptions of the next ruler Prithvideva I indicate that the Ratnapura branch continued to rule as feudatories of the Kalachuris of Tripuri.

Prithvi-deva I was succeeded by his son Jajalla-deva I, who was the first powerful king of the dynasty. The Kalachuris of Ratnapura became de facto independent in his reign. In 1114 CE, Jajalla-deva I invaded the Chindaka Naga territory to the south, annexing southern parts of Kosala which were under Telugu Choda governorship. Jajalla-deva I defeated the Chindaka Naga king Somesvara and took him prisoner, only releasing him at the intervention of his mother.

The next ruler, Ratnadeva II, officially declared independence from the Kalachuris of Tripuri and repulsed an invasion by Anantavarman Chodaganga, the king of the Eastern Ganga dynasty. His successor was Prithvi-deva, whose 15 inscriptions are an important source of the political and cultural history of the kingdom.

== Decline and split ==
Prithvi-deva II's successor Jajalla-deva II reigned for a short and troublesome period, as attested by his Amoda, Malhar, and Sheorinarayan inscriptions. His successors included Ratnadeva III and Pratapa-malla. The political history of the dynasty after Pratapa-malla is uncertain.

The Eastern Gangas and the Kalachuris appear to have involved in a long conflict for the control of the Trikalinga and Kosala regions. According to one theory, the Ganga king Anangabhima-deva III defeated Pratpamalla. This theory is based on the Chateswara Temple inscription, according to which Anganabhima's general Vishnu terrorized the king of Tummana (the old Kalachuri capital) so much that the latter "perceived Vishnu every where throughout his kingdom." According to the Ananta-vasu-deva temple inscription, Anangabhima's daughter Chandrika-devi married a Haihaya prince named Paramardi-deva; this prince must have belonged to the Ratnapura family, although he is unlikely to have belonged to the main branch of that dynasty.

No information is available about Pratapamalla's successors, except a vague reference in Hemadri's Vrata-khanda which suggests that a king named Jajalla may have succeeded Pratapa-malla. The next extant Kalachuri record at Ratnapura is from the reign of king Vahara, who is attested by his 1494 and 1513 CE inscriptions. His relationship to Pratapa-malla is not clear: he traces his genealogy to one Lakshmi-deva. The family appears to have split into two branches after the reign of Lakshmi-deva's son Simhana, with Vahara's ancestor, as suggested by the Raipur stone inscription of Brahmadeva and the Khalari stone inscription of Haribhramadeva. Varaha's ancestor Danghira appears to have ruled at Ratanpur, while Brahmadeva's predecessor Ramachandra appears to have ruled from Raipur. Varaha appears to have moved his capital from Ratnapura to Kosanga (Kosgain), and fought against the Pathanas (Afghans), whose identity is not clear.

No records of Vahara's immediate successors are available, but local traditions mention twelve successors of Bahar Sahai, who can be identified with Vahara. According to the old deshbahis (records) preserved at Ratanpur, examined by the British civil servant J.W. Chisholm, Raja Rajsing (c. 1689-1712) belonged to a "long unbroken line of the Haihayas of Ratanpur". In 1740, the general of the Maratha Nagpur Kingdom, Bhaskar Pant invaded the kingdom and made it recognize Nagpur's suzerainty. The kingdom survived until 1758, when its last ruler Mohan Singh died and the state was annexed by its suzerain, the Maratha Nagpur Kingdom.

== List of rulers ==
Find spots of inscriptions from Ratnapura Kalachuri period (map of India)

The following is a list of the Ratnapura Kalachuri rulers, with estimated period of their reigns:

- Kalinga-raja (1000–1020 CE)
- Kamala-raja (1020–1045 CE)
- Ratna-raja (1045–1065 CE), alias Ratna-deva I
- Prithvi-deva I (1065–1090 CE), alias Prithvisha
- Jajalla-deva I (1090–1120 CE)
- Ratna-Deva II (1120–1135 CE) (declared independence)
- Prithvi-deva II (1135–1165 CE)
- Jajalla-deva II (1165–1168 CE)
- Jagad-deva (1168–1178 CE)
- Ratna-deva III (1178–1200 CE)
- Pratapa-malla (1200–1225 CE)

The next Kalachuri inscriptions are from the reign of the 15th-16th century king Vahara, whose relationship to Pratapa-malla is not clear. The following genealogy can be reconstructed from these records:

- Lakshmideva
- Simhana
- Danghira
- Madana-brahman
- Rama-chandra
- Ratna-sena
- Vahara (attested by 1494 and 1513 CE inscriptions)

No records of Vahara's immediate successors are available. However, according to local traditions, the later rulers of Ratanpur descended from Bahar Sahai, who can be identified with Vahara. The last of these rulers were Raja Raj Singh (c. 1689–1712) and Mohan Singh (c. 1745–1758).

== Geography ==
The Ratnapura Kalachuri kingdom was located east of the main routes between northern and southern India, and was therefore unaffected by the Muslim invasions of the 13th-16th centuries. The kingdom enjoyed 700 years of peaceful existence due to its borders being protected by precipitous mountain ranges on almost all sides.

== Legacy ==
According to a popular theory, the old Kalachuri kingdom consisted of thirty-six garhs or feudal territories, and hence, the region of Chhattisgarh was named after the number of forts it had. However, most historians disagree with this theory as 36 forts have not been found and identified. Another view, more popular with experts and historians, is that "Chhattisgarh" is the corrupted form of "Chedisgarh" meaning "Kingdom of the Chedis".

The Kalachuris of Ratnapura are better known as the "Haihayavanshis" (of the Haihaiya family) in Chhattisgarh and in British documents. The kingdom was named "Mahakoshal" by its rulers to make their kingdom sound more dignified and their sovereignty seem more pronounced. This was also done to distinguish it from North Kosala, its better known namesake and a region located in North India.

== Coinage ==
The Kalachuri rulers of Ratnapura issued gold, silver and copper coins, which bear the issuer's name in Nagari script. The coins feature four types of design:

- Gaja-shardula: Depicts a fight between a lion and an elephant. This design occurs on all their gold coins, and some copper coins.
- Hanumana: Depicts Hanuman in various poses, such as flying, crushing a demon (while sitting or standing), holding a trishula, or holding a flag. Only copper coins feature this design.
- Lion: Depicts a lion, sometimes with a human head. Featured on copper and silver coins.
- Dagger: Features a dagger on copper coins.

Hoards of their coins have been found at following places:

- Sanasari (or Sonsari)
  - 36 gold coins of Jajjaladeva
  - 96 gold coins of Ratnadeva
  - 459 gold coins of Prithvideva
- Sarangarh
  - 26 gold coins of Jajjaladeva
  - 29 gold coins of Ratnadeva
  - 1 gold coin of Prithvideva
- Bhagaund
  - 12 gold coins of Prithvideva
- Dadal-Seoni
  - 136 gold coins of Jajjaladeva, Ratnadeva and Prithvideva
- Bachchhanda
  - 9 gold coins, plus some other conins
- Ratanpur
  - 10 gold coins of Ratnadeva
- Sonpur and Baidyanatha
  - 11 gold coins of Jajjaladeva
  - 9 gold coins of Ratnadeva
  - 5 gold coins of Prithvideva

3 silver coins of Prithvideva were discovered from the Mahanadi riverbed near Balpur. Thousands of copper coins issued by them have also been discovered, including a hoard of 3900 copper coins at Dhanpur in Bilaspur district.

== Inscriptions ==
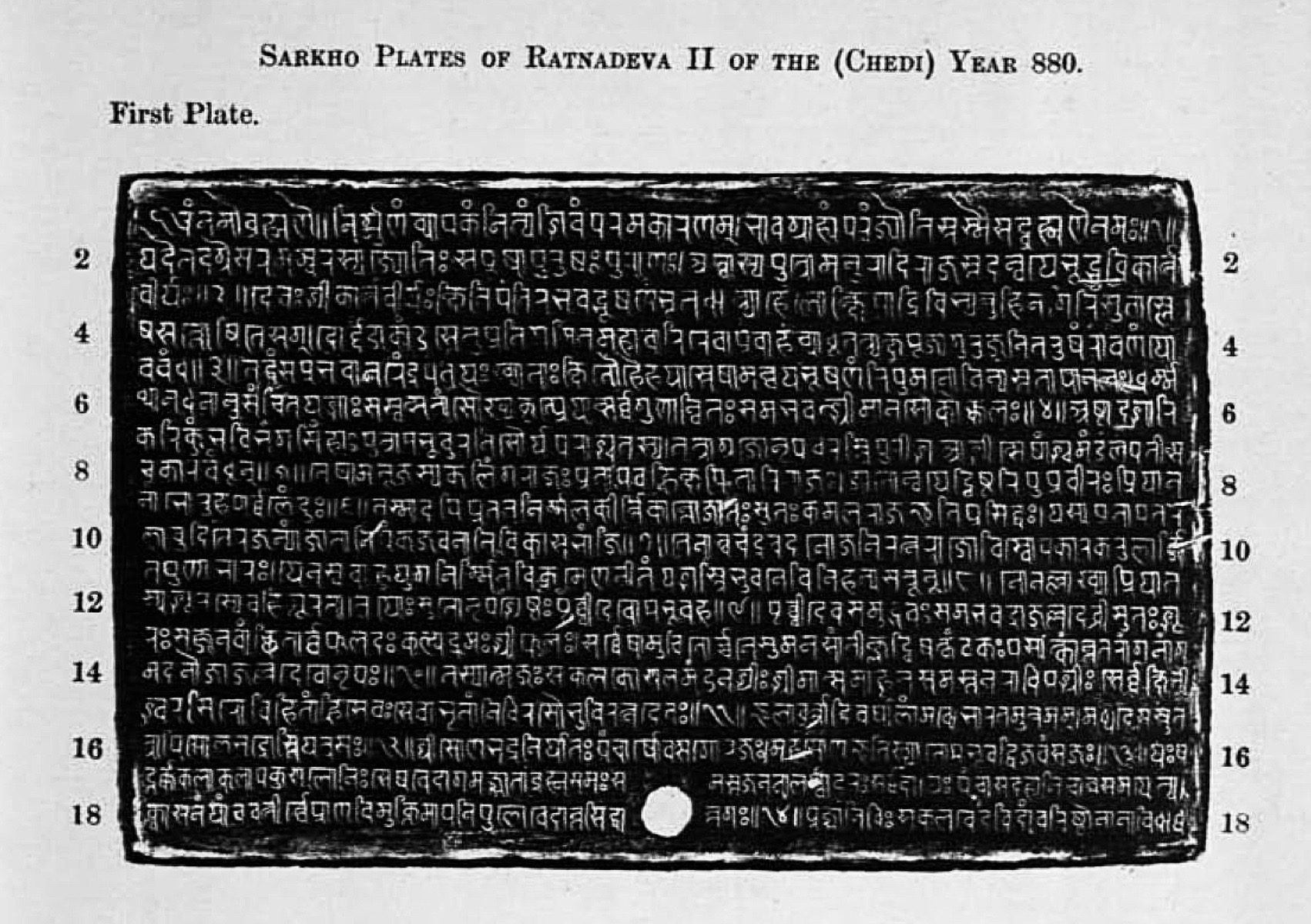
Sarkhon inscription of Ratnadeva

The inscriptions of the Ratnapura Kalachuri rulers have been discovered at several places in present-day Chhattisgarh:

- Prithvideva I: Amora (or Amoda), Lapha, Raipur
- Jajalladeva I: Pali, Ratanpur
- Ratandeva II: Akaltara, Paragaon, Shivrinarayan (or Sheorinarayan), Sarkhon (or Sarkho)
- Prithvideva II: Dahkoni (or Daikoni), Rajim, Bilaigarh, Koni, Amora, Ghotia,
- Jajalladeva II: Amora, Malhar (or Mallar), Shivrinarayan
- Ratnadeva III: Kharod, Pasid
- Pratapamalla: Pendrawan (or Pendrabandh) and Bilaigarh

== See also ==
- Mahamaya Temple in Ratanpur, said to be built by the Kalachuri king Ratnadeva
