= Ratnadeva II =

12th-century ruler of Ratnapura, India

- Maharaja

6th Ratnapura Kalachuri king
- Reign: 1120-1135 CE
- Predecessor: Prithvi-deva I (1065-1090 CE) or Jajalla-deva I (1090-1120 CE)
- Successor: Prithvi-deva II (1135-1165 CE)
- Issue: Prithvi-deva II (1135-1165 CE)
- Dynasty: Kalachuri dynasty (Ratnapura)
- Father: Jajalla-deva I (1090-1120 CE)

Ratnadeva II (r. 1120 – 1135 CE) was the greatest ruler of the Kalachuri dynasty of Ratnapura, in modern-day Indian state of Chhattisgarh. He is known for declaring independence from their overlords, the Kalachuris of Tripuri and defeated an army sent by the Kalachuri king Gayakarna. He is also known for repulsing an invasion by the mighty king of Kalinga, Anantavarman Chodaganga. His predecessor was Jajalla-deva I (r. 1090 – 1120 CE), his father and was succeeded by Prithvi-deva II (r. 1135 – 1165 CE), who was most likely his son.

== Reign ==
Ratnadeva II is known for declaring independence from their overlords, the Kalachuris of Tripuri. He defeated an army sent by the Kalachuri king Gayakarna. He also repulsed an invasion by the mighty king of Kalinga, Anantavarman Chodaganga of the Eastern Ganga Dynasty. He boasts in an inscription of his, that he had defeated King Chodaganga, ruler of Kalinga.

== Inscriptions and coins ==
Ratnadeva II's inscriptions have been found at- Akaltara, Paragaon, Shivrinarayan (or Sheorinarayan), Sarkhon (or Sarkho)

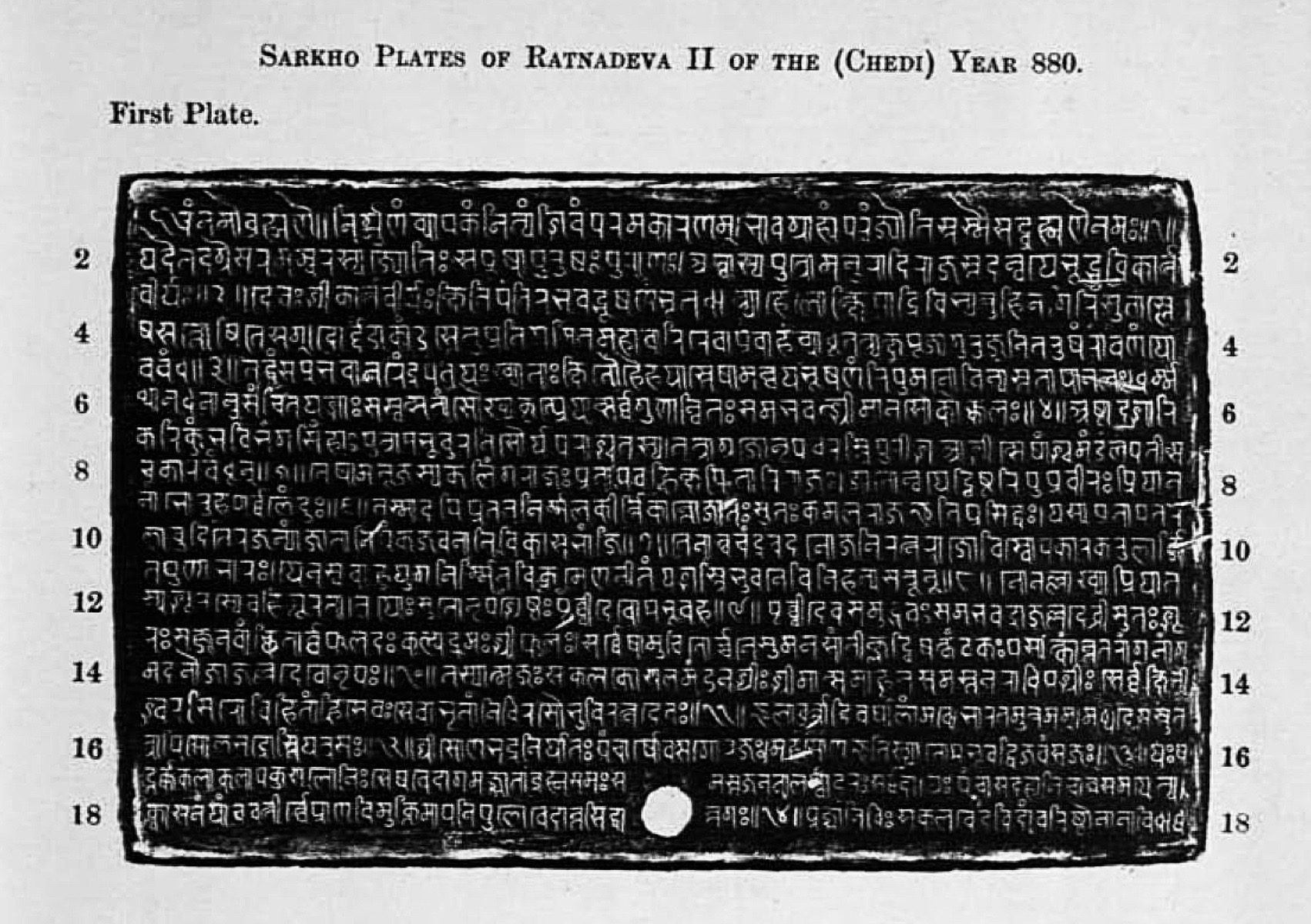
Sarkho plates of Ratnadeva II, Chedi Year 880, Sanskrit Inscription

Many coins of Ratnadeva II have been found at:

- Sanasari (or Sonsari): 96 gold coins
- Sarangarh: 29 gold coins
- Dadal-Seoni: 136 gold coins
- Ratanpur: 10 gold coins
- Sonpur and Baidyanatha: 9 gold coins

== See also ==
- Kalachuris of Ratnapura
- Anantavarman Chodaganga
- Kalachuris of Tripuri
- Gayakarna

== Bibliography ==
- Hermann Kulke; Dietmar Rothermund (1998). A History of India. Psychology Press. ISBN 978-0-415-15482-6.
- Om Prakash Misra (2003). Archaeological Excavations in Central India: Madhya Pradesh and Chhattisgarh. Mittal Publications. ISBN 978-81-7099-874-7.
- P. C. Roy (1980). The Coinage of Northern India. Abhinav. ISBN 9788170171225.
- Rajiv Kumar Verma (2015). "Kalachuri Inscriptions : A Reflection of Dwindling Political Power" (PDF). Veethika. 1 (3). Archived from the original (PDF) on 2017-01-26.
- V. V. Mirashi (1957). "The Kalacuris". In R. S. Sharma (ed.). A Comprehensive history of India: A.D. 985-1206. Vol. 4 (Part 1). Indian History Congress / People's Publishing House. ISBN 978-81-7007-121-1.
