= Manikeshwari Temple =

Manikeswari Temple
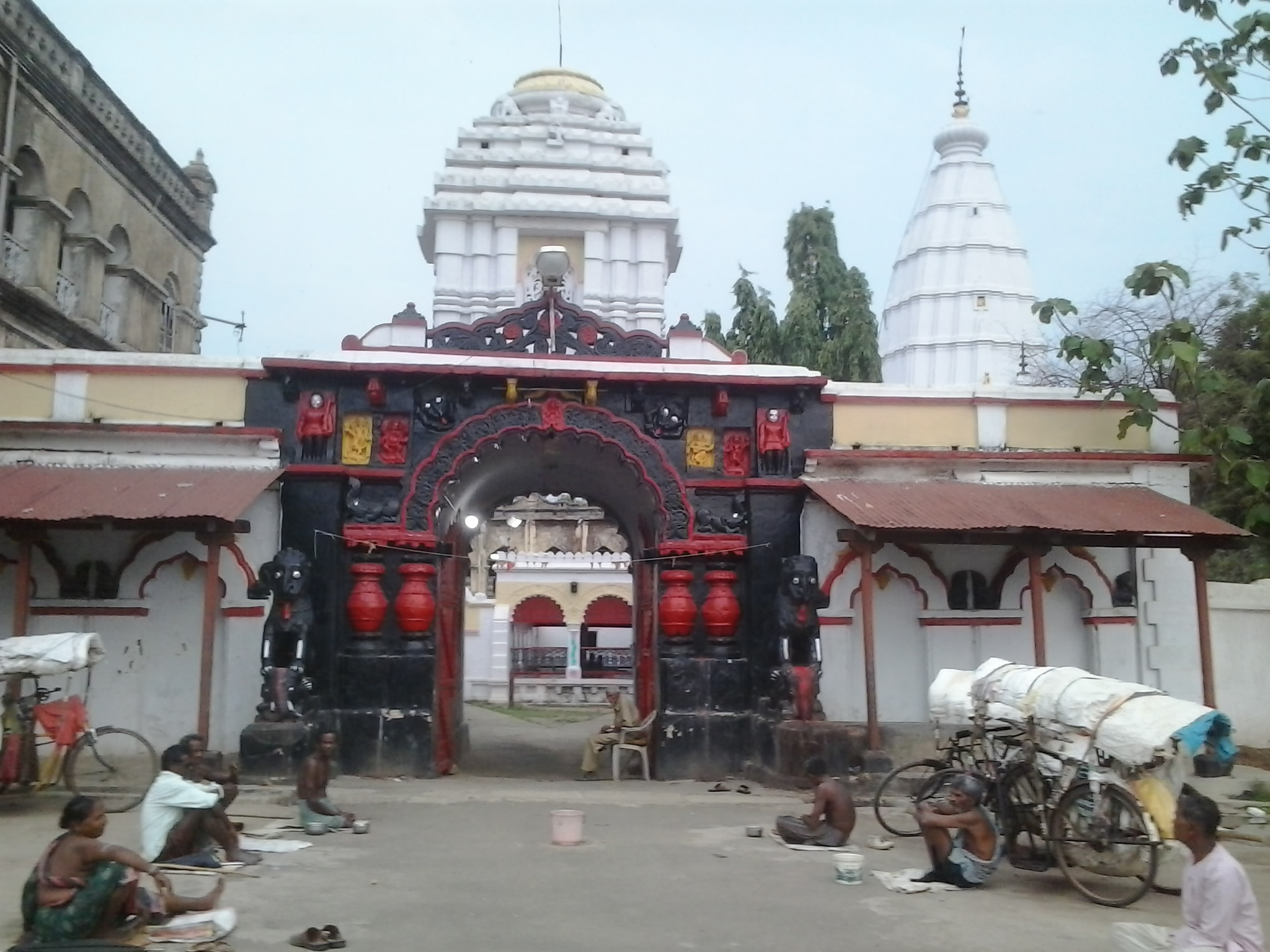
- The main gateway of Manikeswari Temple

Religion
- Affiliation: Hinduism
- District: Kalahandi
- Deity: Goddess Manikeswari
- Festival: Chhatar Jatra
- Governing body: 1935

Location
- Location: Bhawanipatna
- State: Odisha
- Country: India
- Interactive map of Manikeswari Temple
- Coordinates: 19.9060°N 83.1694°E

Architecture
- Creator: Brajamohan Deo

Manikeshwari Temple is located in Kalahandi district of Odisha, India. The temple is located to the south of odisha. The main deity here is Goddess Manikeshwari. She is the Ishta Devi of Nagavanshi Khyatriya's. During Dussehra festival, animal sacrifice is offered at this temple. A film is also documented showing the ritual of animal sacrifice, before Goddess Manikeshwari. Karlapat, which is famous for its charming wild life, is near the temple.

== History of Present Temple ==
Udit Narayan Deo laid the foundation of the present Manikeswari temple in Bhawanipatna and it was completed in 1947 by Brajamohan Deo. Manikeswari was associated with Kalahandi history as a goddess of wealth, Manik, since the 10th century.

== Chhatar Yatra ==
Every year Chatar yatra on the navami tithi of Dussehra is organised and many people who have fulfilled wishes come and sacrifice animals in the name of goddess.

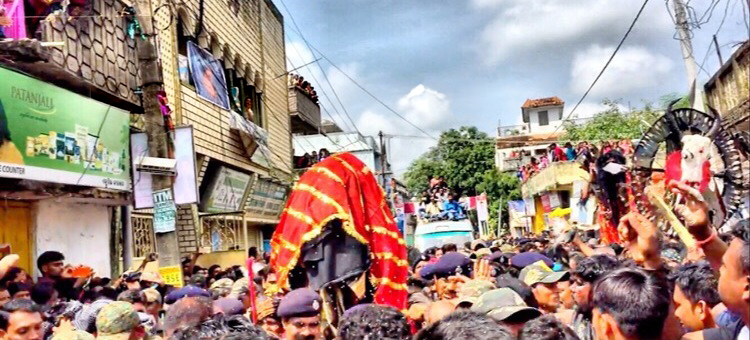
Maa Manikeswari Chatar Jatra, Bhawanipatna

== Images ==
=== Manikeswari Temples in Odisha ===
Bhawanipatna

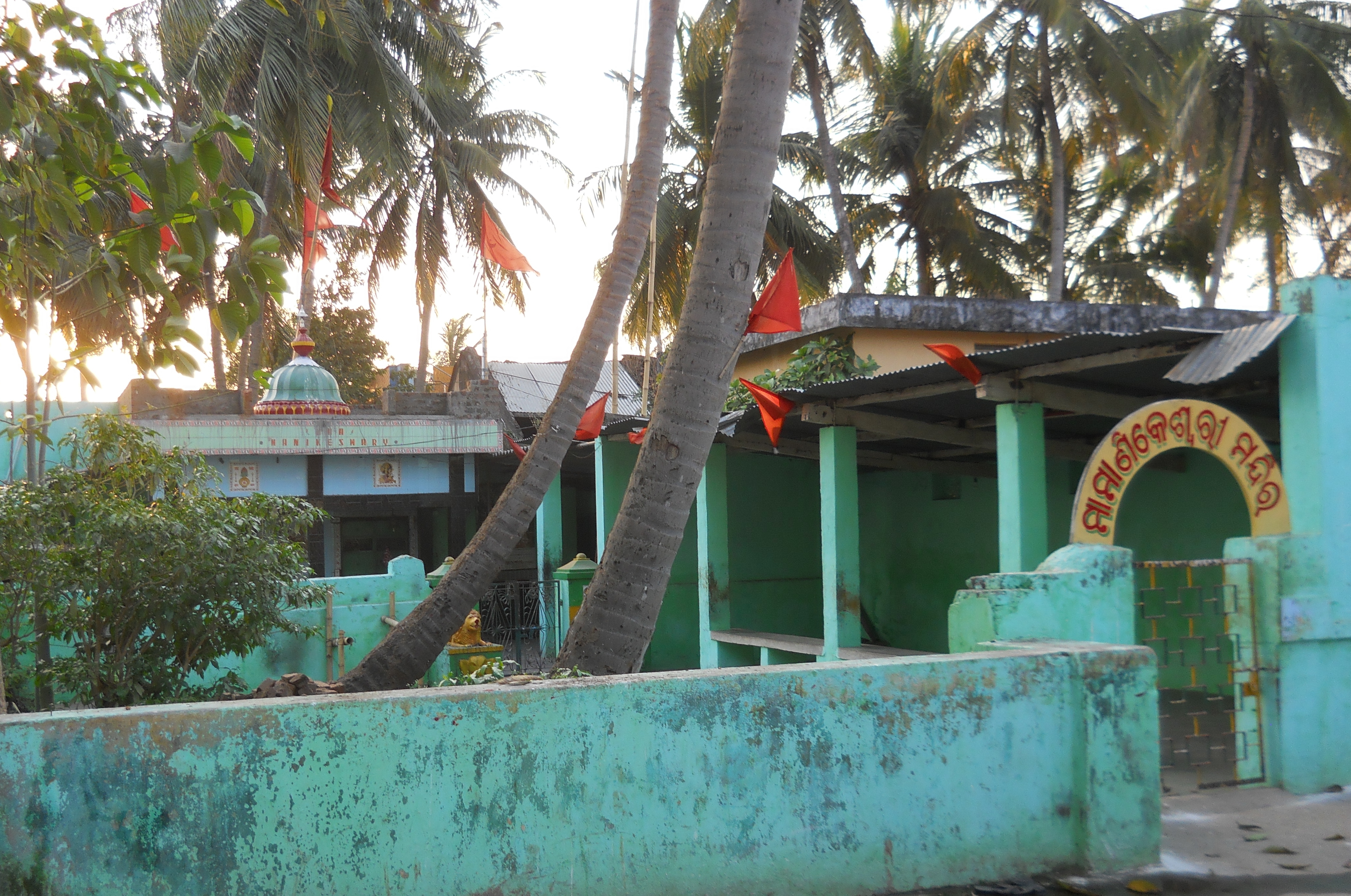
Gunupur

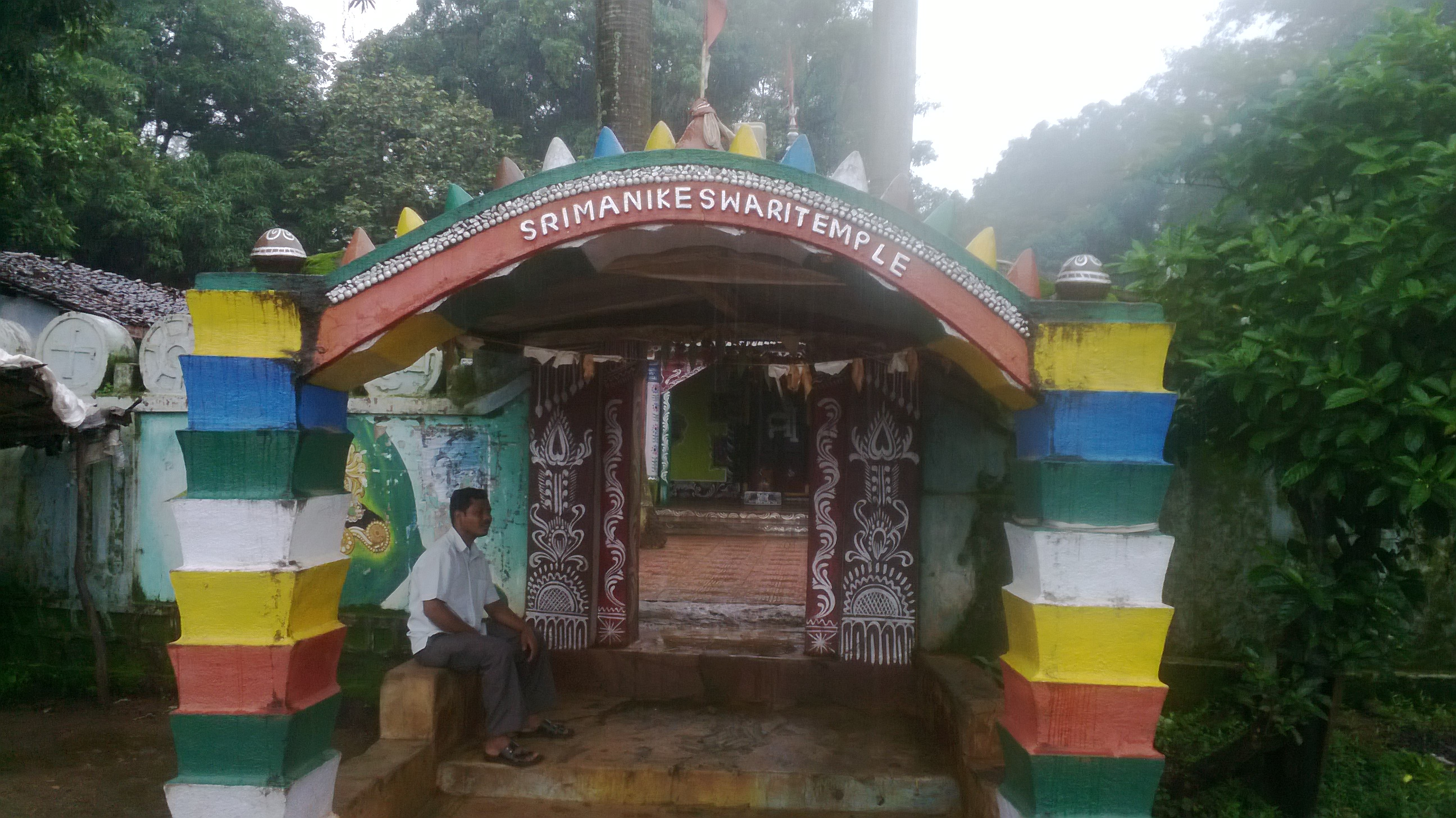
Thuamul Rampur

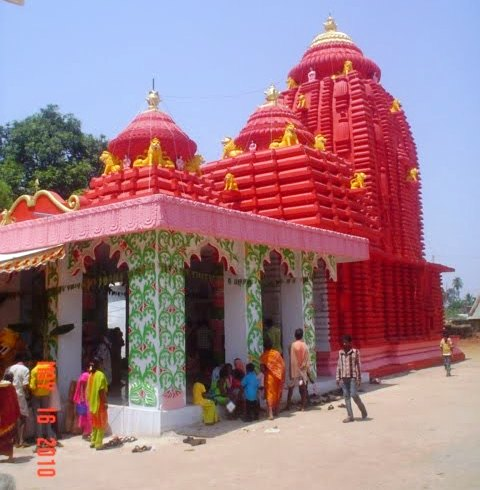
Kashipur, Rayagada

== Panoramic Views ==
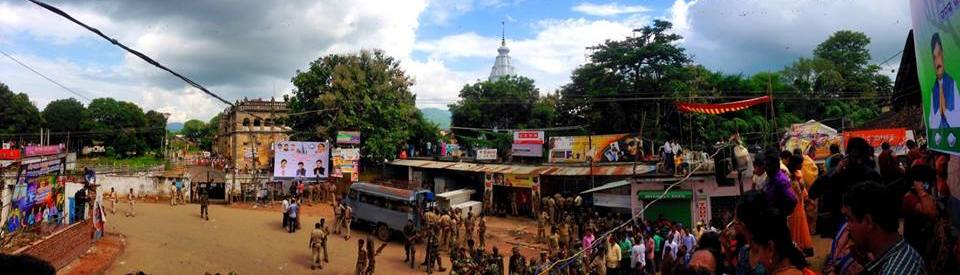
Manikeswari Temple in 2016
