= Narayanpal Temple =

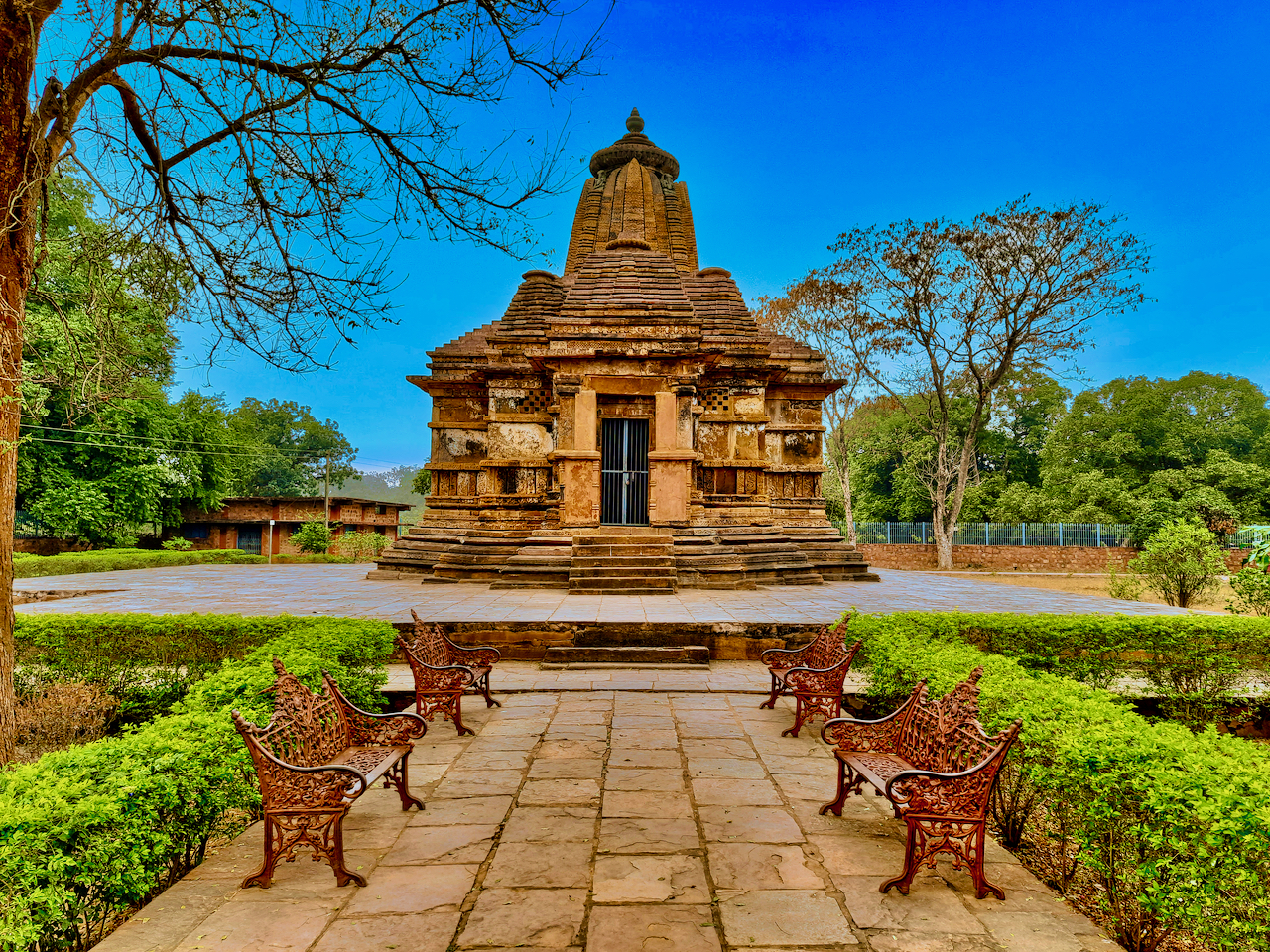
- Narayanpal Temple

- Location in Chhattisgarh

Religion
- Affiliation: Hinduism
- District: Bastar district
- Deity: Vishnu

Location
- Location: Narayanpal village
- State: Chhattisgarh
- Country: India
- Interactive map of Narayanpal Temple
- Coordinates: 19°11′59″N 81°44′25″E

Architecture
- Type: Nagara
- Completed: 1111 c.
- Temple: 1

The Narayanpal Temple is a historic Hindu temple located near the confluence of the Indravati and Narangi rivers in the Bastar district of Chhattisgarh, India. It is dedicated to the Hindu god Vishnu, the protector of the universe in Hindu mythology. The temple is situated in the village of Narayanpal, about 4 kilometers east of the reputed Chitrakote Falls. The temple was built around 1111 AD by Mumunda Devi, a queen of the Chindaka Naga dynasty. It was built in the Nagara style of Hindu temple architecture and influenced by the Chalukya style as well.

The inscriptions present at the temple are written in the Devanagari script.The inscription details a land grant to a 'Lokeswar' by Gunda Mahadevi, the queen-mother of the Chindaka Naga dynasty.
