= Tuman, Chhattisgarh =

Village in Chhattisgarh, India

Tuman
- Country: India
- State: Chhattisgarh
- District: Korba

Population (2011)
  - Total: 1,974

Tuman (also known as Tumana or Tummana) is a village located in the Korba district of the Indian state of Chhattisgarh.

== History ==
It used to be the capital of the Kalachuris of Ratnapura.

== Landmarks ==
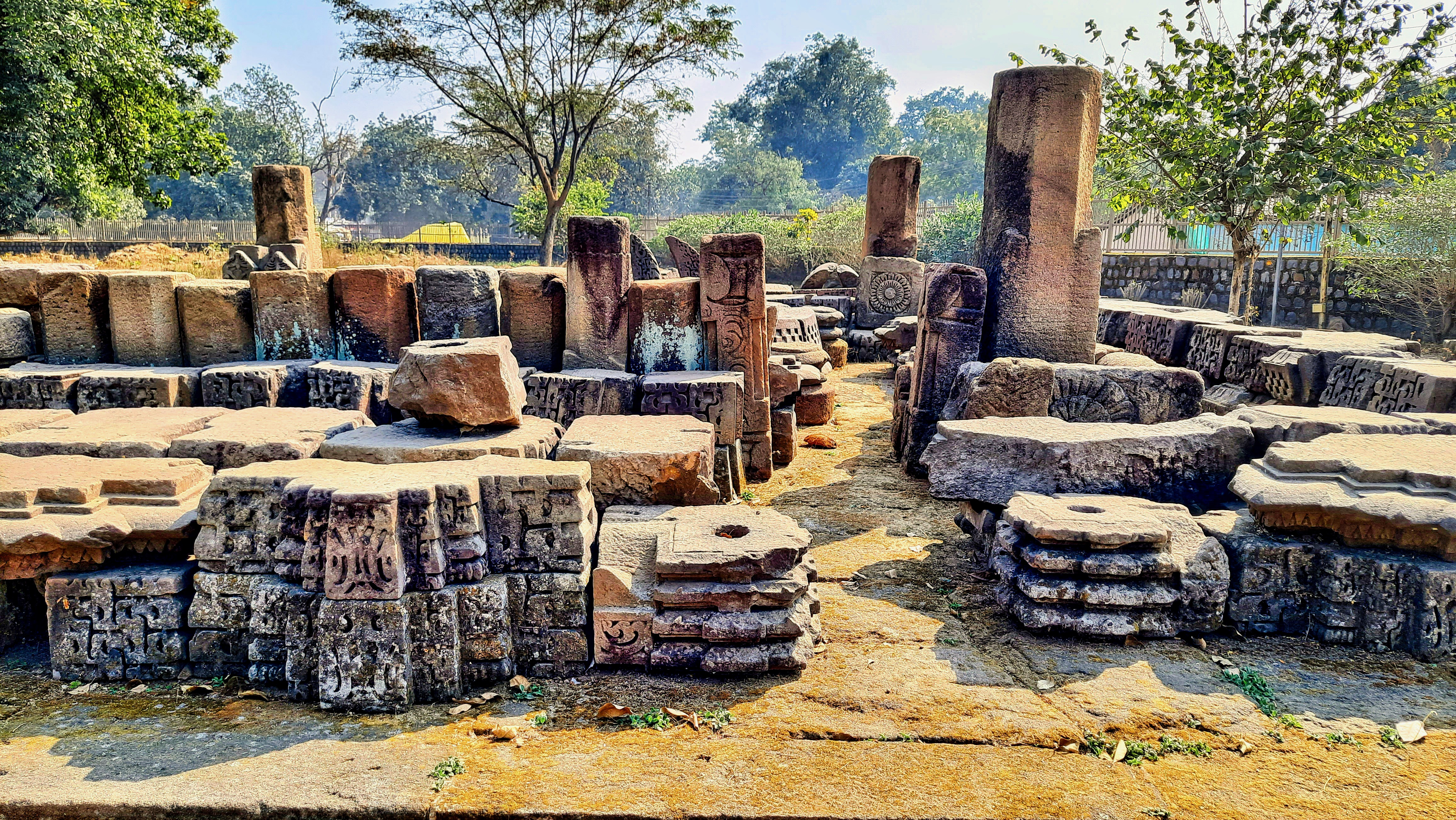
Ruins at Tuman.

The ruins of several temples are located here. Among these, the Mahadev temple is listed as a monument of national importance.

== Demographics ==
According to the 2011 census, the village had a population of 1974, in 480 households.
