= Chindaka Naga =

Indian dynasty (1023–1324)

Chindaka Nagas of Chakrakota
- c. 1023–c. 1324
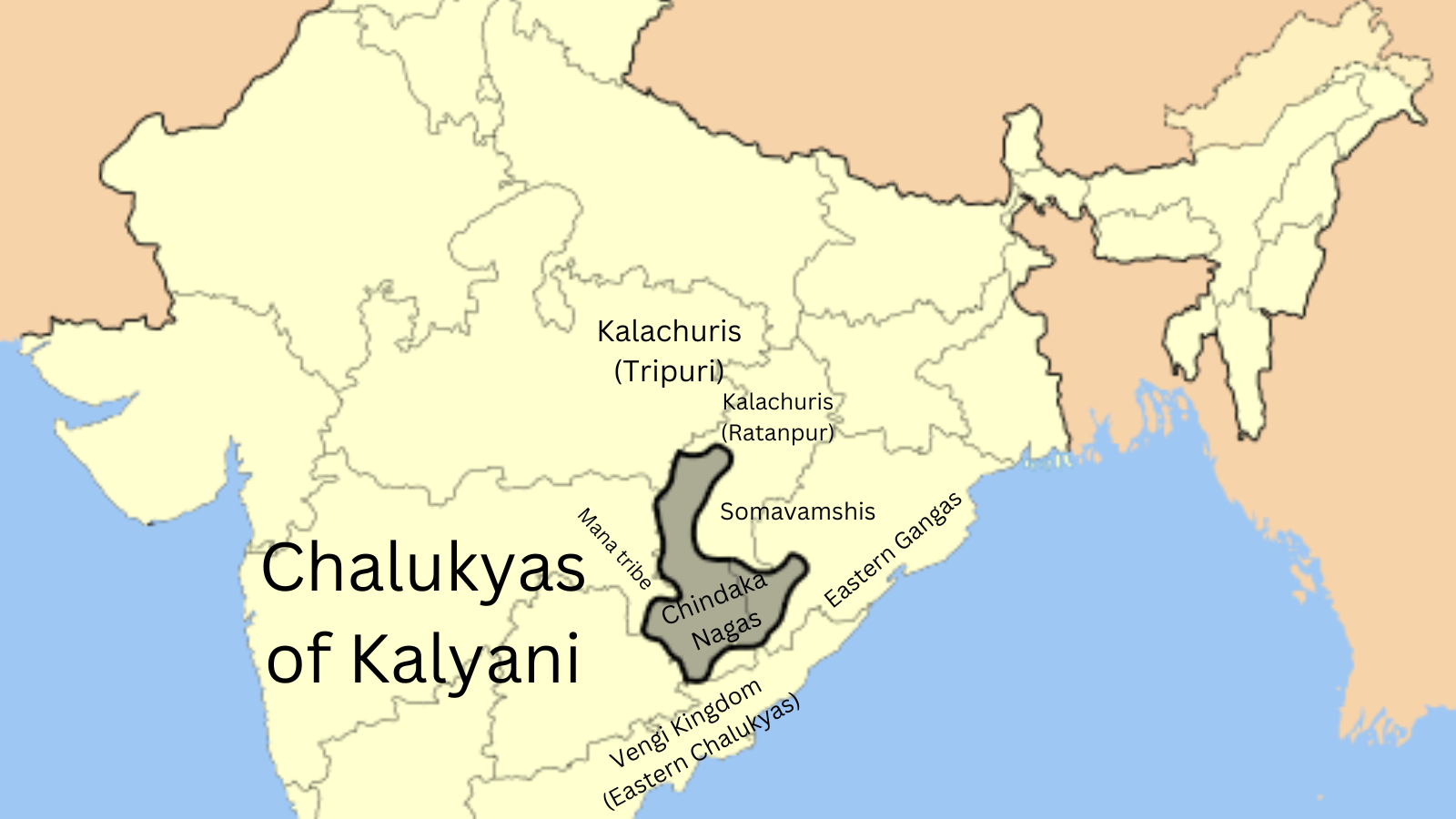
- The Chindaka Nagas at their height under King Somesvara along with their neighbours
- Capital: Barasur
- Religion: Hinduism
- Government: Monarchy
- Maharaja (King)
  - c. 1023: Nrupati Bhushana
  - c. 1324: Harishchandradeva
- History
  - Established: c. 1023
  - Disestablished: c. 1324
| Preceded by | Succeeded by |
| Somavamshi dynasty | Kalachuris of Ratnapura |
- Today part of: India

The Chindaka Nagas were a dynasty that ruled over parts of modern-day Odisha and Chhattisgarh. Their kingdom was known as Chakrakota mandala and included the present-day districts of Bastar, Koraput and Kalahandi. They were constantly at war with their neighbours- the Somavamshi dynasty, the Kalachuris of Ratnapura, the Mana dynasty and the Western Chalukya Empire.

== Origin ==
The Chindaka Nagas belonged to Kashyapa gotra and were of Kannada origin, hailing from the Sindavadi country in present-day Karnataka. They were a branch of the Sinda family of Gulbarga. Several historians agree with this theory of the Nagas having Kannada ancestry.

The Nagas are believed by certain historians to have arrived in the Chakrakota Mandala region (Bastar-Koraput district-Kalahandi) in 1022 with the expedition of the Chola emperor Rajendra Chola.

Historian Hira Lal Shukla is of the opinion that the Somavamshi kings Uddyotakeśarī and Janmejaya II might have helped the Nagas establish a kingdom in Chakrakota. Jitāmitra Prasāda Siṃhadeba has hypothesized that the Nagas of Kalahandi were related to the Chindaka Nagas due to the proximity of Kalahandi and Bastar, both the states having Manikyadevi as their patron goddess and because around the time the Naga rule in Chakrakota ended, the Kalahandi kingdom was founded.

However, historian Shiv Kumar Tiwari believes that the Nagas ruled in the Bastar region of Chhattisgarh since as early as 760 A.D. His take of historical events from the Nava-sahasanka-charita epic poem is as follows- the Naga ruler of Bastar, Sankhapala, sought help from the Shilahara ruler Aparajita when the ruler of the Mana tribe invaded his kingdom.

== History ==
The Chindaka Nagas ruled over parts of the modern-day Indian state of Odisha and the historical region of Dakshina Kosala. Their kingdom was known as Chakrakota mandala and included the present-day districts of Bastar, Koraput and Kalahandi. Manikyadevi was the patron goddess of these Nagavansi rulers.

The Telugu Chodas who migrated to the region, settled as their feudal rulers. Chandraditya Maharaja, a Telugu Choda chieftain, was a mahamandalashwara (an Indian feudal title) and ruler of Ammagama (modern Ambogam village in Kotapad) was a feudatory of Jagadeka Bhushana.

The Bhanjas of Boudh branch came into conflict with the Chindaka Nagas. In 1060 AD, the Bhanja king Yasobhanja defeated and killed Jagadeka Bhushana. Taking advantage of the power vacuum, Madhurantaka, a close relative of the dead king usurped the throne. However, Somesvara the son of Jagadeka Bhushana claimed the throne as well, leading to a civil war in Chakrakota lasting for 5 years. Kulottunga I, the Chola emperor supported Madhurantaka while the Chola's archrivals, the Chalukyas of Kalyana, supported Somesvara in the struggle. Subsequently, Madhurantaka was killed and Somesvara assumed kingship of Chakrakota. According to N.K. Sahu, Somesvara was the most powerful ruler of the Chindaka Nagas.

Somasvera warred with the declining Somavamshi dynasty who were ruling in Utkala and Kosala at the time. Yosoraja I, the father of Chandraditya Maharaja and Telugucoda lieutenant of Chindaka Naga king Somesvara conquered the eastern parts of Kosala which were under the Somavamshi dynasty in 1069 AD. Yosoraja I then served as the governor of Kosala for Somesvara. In his Kuruspal inscription, Somesvara claimed to have raided the Vengi Kingdom, subjugated the Mana tribe, and declared to have defeated the Udra chief (Somavamshi king) and captured six lakh and ninety-six villages of Dakshina Kosala (central Chhattisgarh) from him. Historian Shiv Kumar Tiwari believes that the conquest of Dakshina Kosala by Somesvara is likely an exaggeration and that he only held a small part of that territory for a short period.

The Somavamsis, who had declined, began serving Eastern Gangas, Kalachuri and Chindaka Nagas as chieftains. The Chindaka Naga rulers called themselves as Nagavamsi and the lords of Bhogavati. Bhogavati was the capital of the mythical snake-demons called Nagas.

The Chindaka Nagas were defeated by the Kakatiya vassal of Someshvara I, the Chalukya emperor. This dynasty continued to rule the region till the thirteenth century with not many details known about their rulers excepting a few.

== Decline ==
The Kalachuri king of Ratanpur, Jajalla-deva I (1090-1120 CE), invaded the Chindaka Naga territory in 1114 AD annexing Kosala which was under Telugu Choda governorship. Jajalla-Deva I defeated Somesvara and took him prisoner, only releasing him at the intervention of his mother.

During the struggle between the Gangas of Orissa and Kalachuris of Ratnapura for the Kalahandi region, the Chindaka Nagas allied themselves with the Gangas. The Kalachuri king Prithvi-deva II retaliated by devastating Chakrakota and destroying the Chindaka Naga capital, in an attempt to terrorise the Ganga king Anantavarman. The Bilaigarh copper plates inscription of Prithvideva reads- "His son Prithvîdëva (II) of well-known fame, who has planted his lotus-like foot on the rows of hostile princes' heads, has become the lord of kings — (he) who, by devastating Chakrakota, overwhelmed the illustrious Ganga king with anxiety in regard to the crossing of the ocean which was the sole means (of saving his life)."

During the first half of 13th century, Chakrakota was invaded by Kholeshvara, the general of Yadava ruler Singhanadeva of Deogiri. Kakatiya ruler Ganapatideva also invaded bastar during 13th century. The last known ruler of this dynasty was Harishchandradeva, known from a Sati inscription dated 1324 AD.

== Branches ==
A branch of the Chindakas/Chindas led by a Vallabharaja formed a dynasty that ruled from Bodh Gaya from the 11th to 13th centuries. This branch of the Chindakas were patrons of Buddhism and held the title of magadhādipati referring to the Magadha region.

== Coat of arms ==
The Naga kings' coat of arms included a snake banner and the "tiger-with-cub" crest.

== List of rulers ==
The Chindaka Naga rulers known from inscriptions (dated to regnal years) are-

- Nrupati Bhushana (c. 1023 – ?)
- Jagadeka Bhushana or Dharavarsha
- Madhurantaka (1060-1069)
- Somesvara (c. 1069 - ?)
- Kanhara I
- Raja Bhushana
- Kanhara II
- Jagadeka Bhushana Narasimhadeva
- Somesvara II
- Harishchandradeva (c. 1324 - ?)

== See also ==
- Kalachuris of Ratnapura
- Dakshina Kosala
