= Thuamul Rampur =

- Town
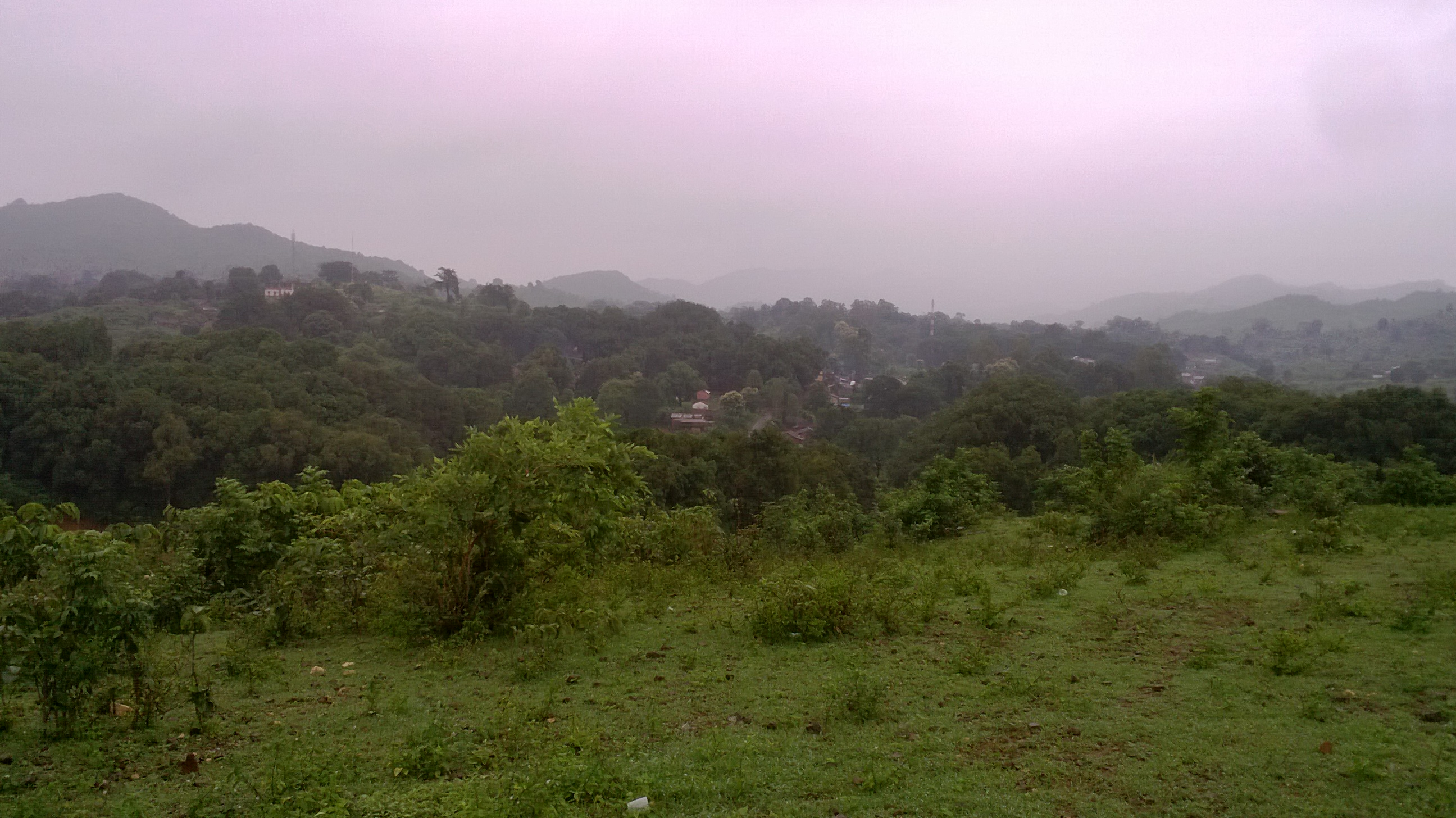
- Thuamul Rampur from nearby Hill

- Location in Odisha, India
- Coordinates: 19.5469°N 82.9207°E
- Country: India
- State: Odisha
- District: Kalahandi
- Demonym: Kalahandia

Languages
  - Official: English, Odia
- Time zone: UTC+5:30 (IST)
- PIN: 766037
- Telephone code: 06675
- Vehicle registration: OD-08/OR-08
- Website: kalahandi.nic.in

Thuamul Rampur is a town in Thuamul Rampur Block, Kalahandi District of Odisha State. The town is 72 km from the district headquarters Bhawanipatna, and 500 km from the state capital Bhubaneswar. It is also referred as the Kashmir of Kalahandi as it receives moderate amount of snow fall in the winter season. Rich in flora and fauna this area is the key site for origination of rivers like Nagavali and Indravati where Indravati Dam has been built.

It is connected to district headquarter by both Govt. and private buses as well as with neighboring districts of Rayagada and Koraput.

== Tourism ==
Thuamul Rampur is mainly known for scenic and picnic spots around it.

- Thuamul Rampur

Thuamul Rampur is situated at 723 m above sea level in the eastern ghats. It is one of the 13 blocks in Kalahandi districts lies in the southernmost part of the district and surrounded from east to Rayagada, west to Koraput and west to Nabarangpur district respectively. Erstwhile Kasipur was a part of Kalahandi, adjacent to Thuamul Rampur but due to administrative difficulties it was transferred to Rayagada district without public opinion and information in mid 70's.

- Maa Manikeshwari Mandir

Very few people know that there are two Maa Manikeshwari Mandir i.e., one in Bhawanipatna while another at Thuamul Rampur. It is situated near bus stand adjacent to the ancient Raj Mahal.

- Raj Mahal of Thuamul Rampur

There is a small Raj Mahal (now abandoned) in the center of the town. It was once converted to College due to lack of infrastructure and is converted to court now.

- Tourist Complex, Thuamul Rampur

Tourist Complex was inaugurated by Ministry of Tourism and Culture (Govt. of Odisha) in the year 1995. It was serving as a panthanivas for the tourist for hospitality and accommodation with various facilities. Lack of interest and less focus given to tourism here by state government made it abandoned for tourists.

- Hello Point

Hello Point is a picnic spot and valley view point 75 km from Bhawanipatna. It is present on the top of the eastern ghats from where half of the Kalahandi district is visible including Junagarh, Kalampur block etc. One can receive signal from all telecom services for mobile, therefore it is named as Hello Point.

Including schools and other government offices (Post Office, Block office, Telephone Exchange etc.) it has Banks and a Community Health Center too for financial and health like basic services.

- Sinder Jharan (Waterfalls)

Sinder is a destination that is special for its waterfall and picnic spot. It is situated in Balangi village panchayat, near Birikot.
