= Chatar jatra =

Traditional festival in Orissa, India

Chatar Jatra
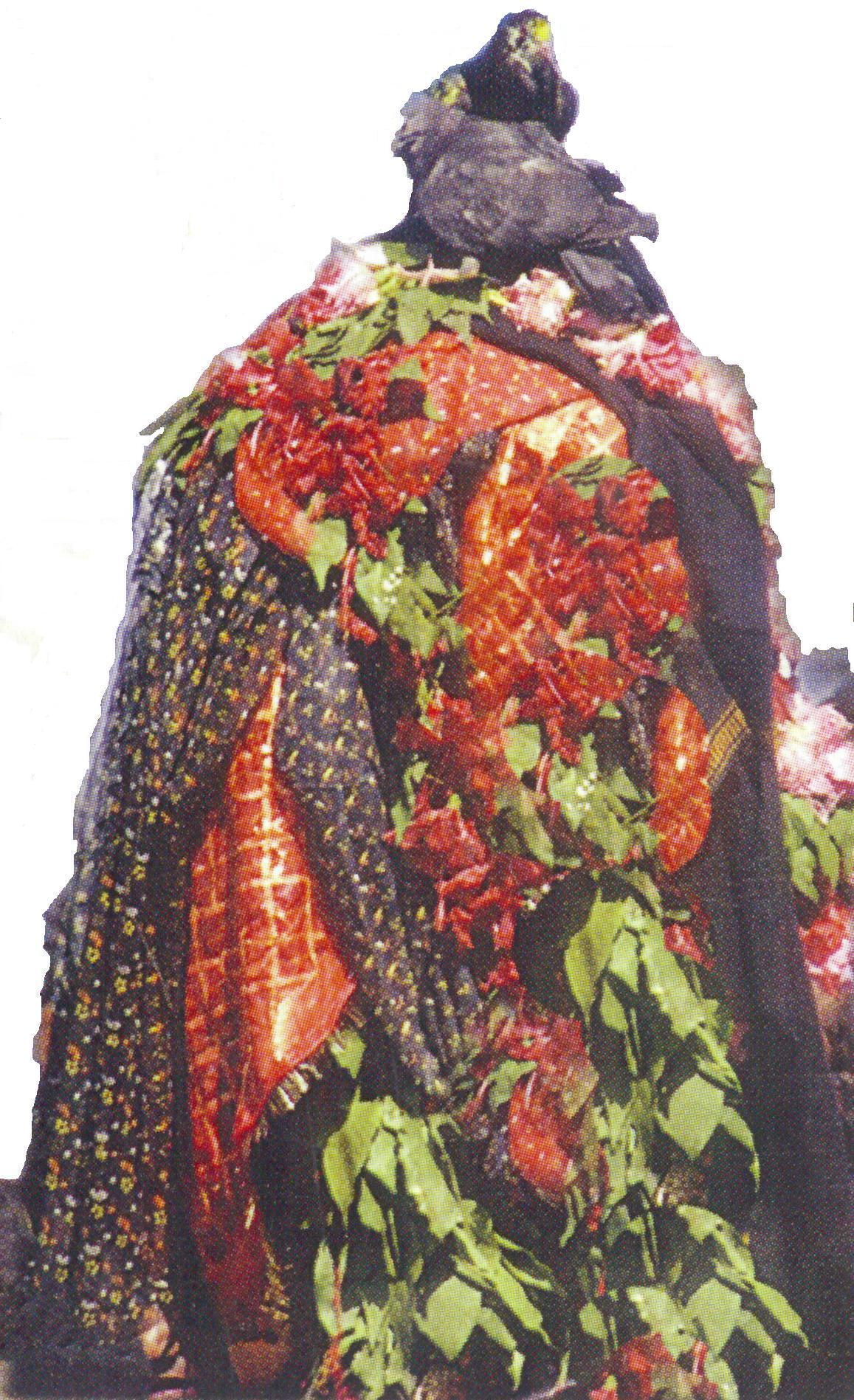
- Chhatar of Goddess Manikeswari
- Official name: Chhatar Jatra
- Observed by: Hindus
- Type: Religious
- Begins: Maha astami, Durga Puja

Chatar Jatra or Chatar Yatra is a traditional festival celebrated by the people of Kalahandi District, Orissa, India. The festival involves Maa Manikeswari, the family goddess of the Kalahandi King's family.

== Origin ==
Maa Manikeswari is the prominent presiding goddess of Kalahandi district. The temple of the goddess is situated within the boundary of the ex-rulers of Kalahandi, so that the rulers could observe the auspicious festival Chhatra Jatra, which has been transformed and is now known as Chatar yatra.

== Plot ==
Chhatra Jatra or Chatar Jatra or Chatar Yatra are meant to celebrate the Vijaya utsav with cheerful heart and splendid display. The festival is being celebrated during the Mahastami of Durga puja festival. The ritual practice of Khonds (Adivasis of Kalahandi Districts) Nabakalevar (the renewal of post-worship) is also performed during the festival.

Maa Manikeswari comes out from the Garbhagriha on Mahastami mid night to Jenakhal which is at about 3 km distance from the alma mater. The jatra starts with Nagar Paribhramana on Mahanavami auspicious morning. A bamboo covered with black cloth represents Maa Manikeswari in the jatra, and at the top on silver plate Dasamahavidya Yantra is installed which represents the Tantric Hinduism. To please Maa Manikeswari, a tribal dance is performed, which is known as Ghumura dance. Ghumura is a traditional dance and a heritage of Kalahandi district. It is a dance performed with a traditional instrument Ghumura Veer Badya. The dancers tie the Ghumura (badya/instrument) on their shoulders and hang it tight on their chest.

== Celebration ==
Chatar Jatra is mainly celebrated in the district headquarter of Kalahandi, Bhawanipatna though Thuamul Rampur, Jugasaipatna and Bhawanipatna, all three places are famous for Maa Manikeswari temple.

Animal sacrifice is prevalent in this festival. Though government has strictly banned these kind of activities, still devotees don't follow the rule. About 50,000 animal sacrifies take place in this festival.

== Gallery ==
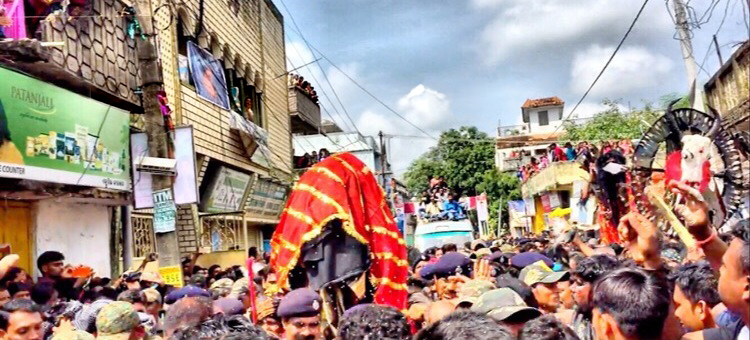

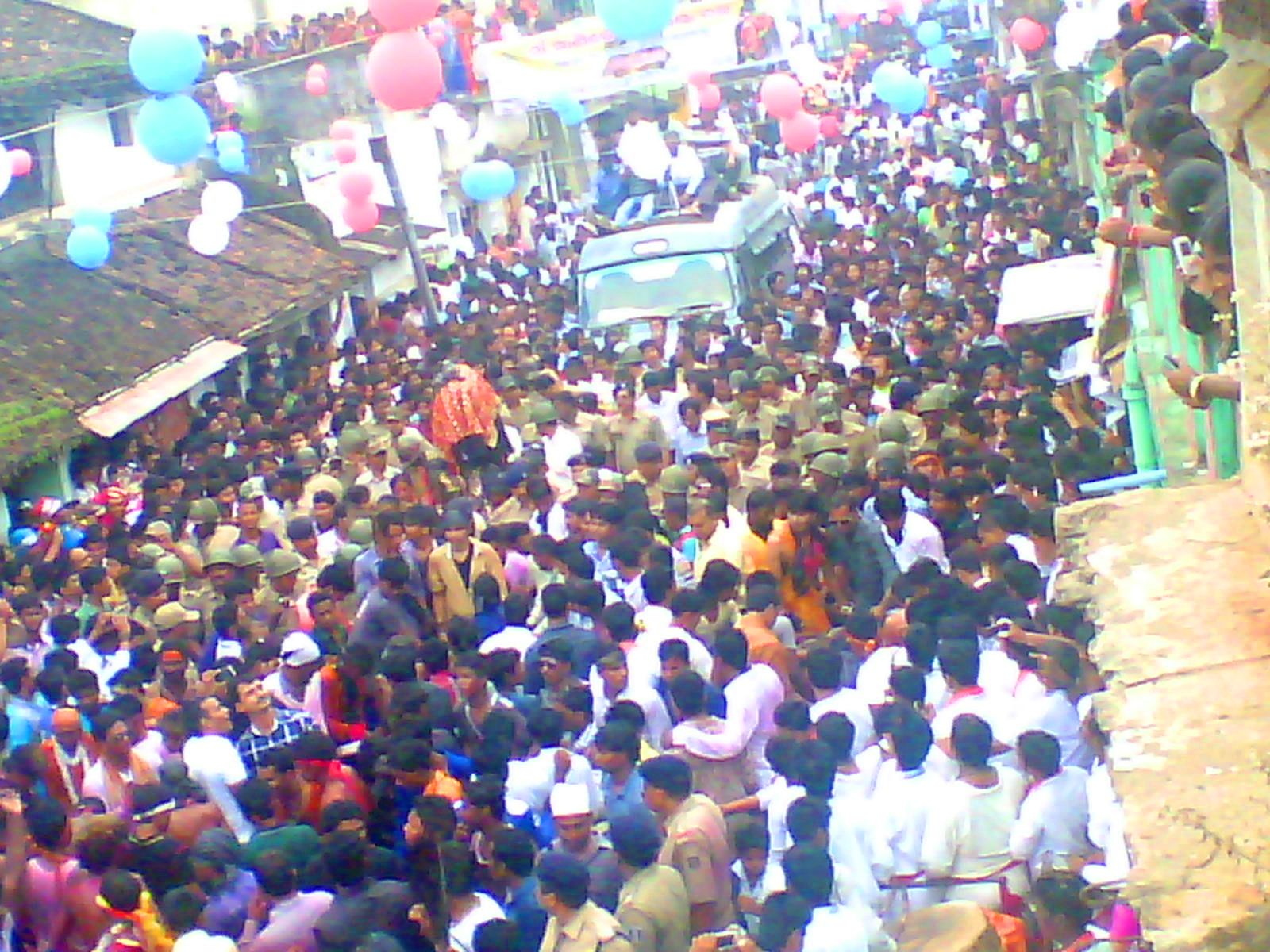
Crowd during Chhatar Jatra

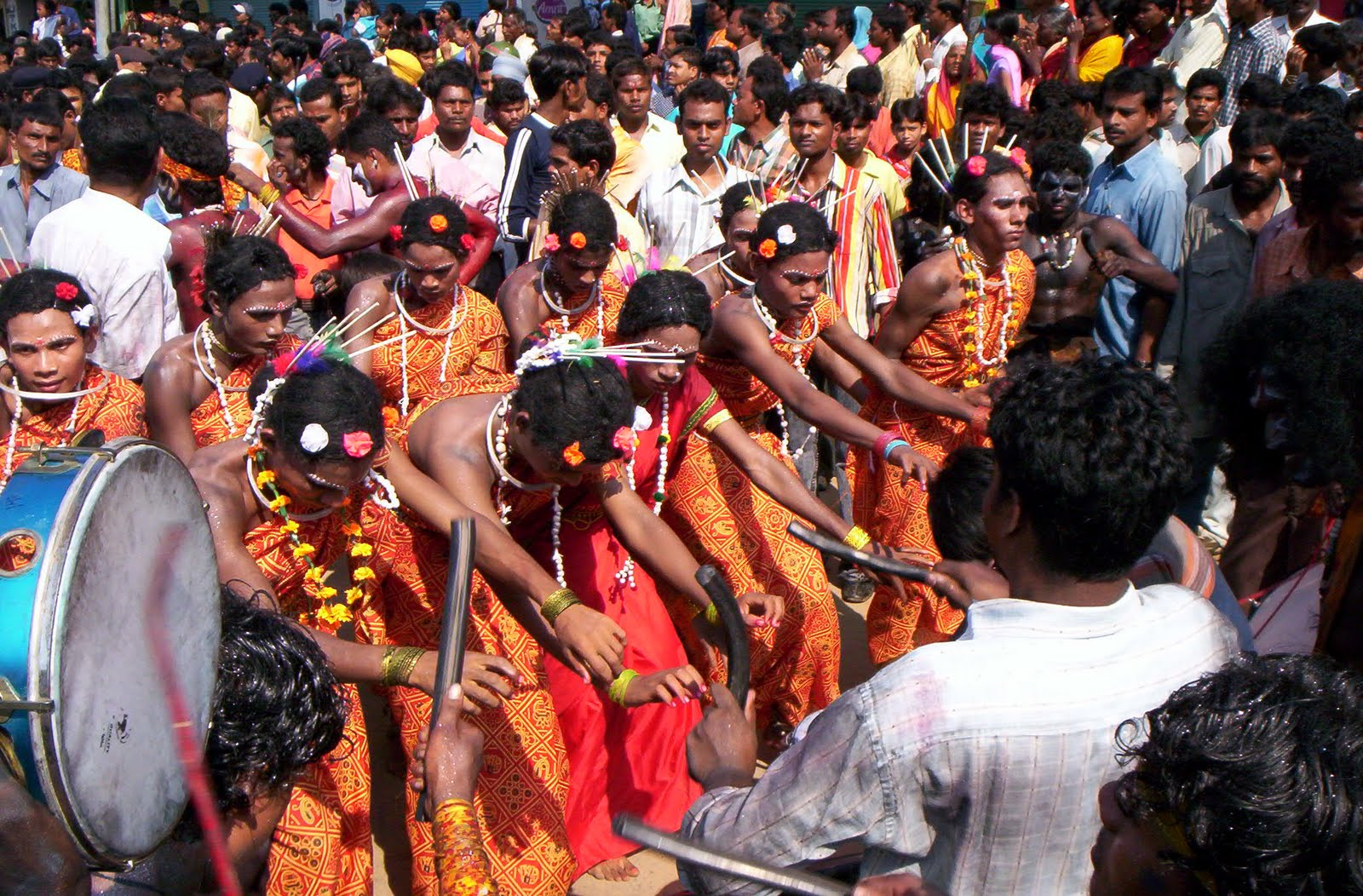
Rituals during Chhatar Jatra
