= Rajaraja Devendravarman =

Eastern Ganga emperor from 1070 to 1077

Rajaraja I
- Kalingadhipati

Eastern Ganga emperor
- Reign: 20 May 1070 – 1077
- Predecessor: Vajrahasta V
- Successor: Anantavarman Chodaganga
- Born: 997; Kalinganagari; Capital of Kalinga, Eastern Ganga dynasty (modern-day Mukhalingam, Andhra Pradesh)
- Died: 1078 (aged 80–81); Kalinganagari, Eastern Ganga dynasty
- Spouse: Rajasundari (Chola princess)
- Issue: Anantavarman Chodaganga; Ulagaikonda Permadi
Regnal name
- Kalingadhipati Devendravarman Rajaraja Deva I
- Dynasty: Eastern Ganga
- Father: Vajrahasta V
- Religion: Hinduism

Devendravarman Rajaraja I (reigned 20 May 1070 – 1077) was an Eastern Ganga monarch who ruled Kalinga from the year 1070 to 1077. He gained control over Kalinga after defeating the Somavanshi king Mahasivagupta Janmenjaya II completely while challenging the Cholas in battle, along with establishing authority in the Vengi region. He was the father of Anantavarman Chodaganga deva who ruled over Kalinga and expanded its territory from Ganga to Godavari.

== Reign Period ==
Rajaraja Devendravarman I, ascended the throne around 1070 CE and ruled until approximately 1078 CE. His reign was marked by significant military and political activities that expanded and consolidated the Ganga Dynasty's influence in the region.

== Military Achievements ==
- Conflict with the Cholas: He engaged in battles against the Chola Dynasty over the territories of Vengi, at the time of Virarajendra Chola. He aided the paternal uncle of Kulottunga, Vijayaditya to Capture Vengi. The Vizagapatnam plates of saka year 1040 states that he defeated the Cholas also known as Dramilas in the record and Chola princess, Rajasundari (Daughter of Rajendra Chola as stated by the Vizagapatnam plates of saka year 1057) was married off to him as a goodwill gesture for settlement of affairs between the Cholas and the Gangas.
- Conflict with the Somavanshis: Dirghasi inscription states that Ganpati, the brahmana chieftain of Rajaraja I destroyed the army of the Utkala king Mahashivagupta Janmejaya II of the Somavanshi dynasty, thereby annexing the southern part of the territory into the Ganga domain.

== Legacy ==
His son, Anantavarman Chodaganga Deva, succeeded him and is known for constructing the Jagannath Temple in Puri.
