= Manikeswari =

Hindu deity in Odisha, India

Manikeswari is one of the popular Hindu deities in Odisha. There are many Manikeswari temples present in the Western and Southern parts of Odisha.

Modern Manikeswari Temple in Bhawanipatna

Manikeswari temple in Bhawanipatna of Kalahandi District is well recognized in Odisha. Manikeswari is the primary deity associated with the royal family of Kalahandi Kingdom, Chakrakota Kingdom, Paralakhemundi kingdom and Gadapur Ganga Family. Chhatar Jatra is one of the most popular festivals of Manikeswari at Bhawanipatna. Khandasadhaka is a festival associated with Manikeswari in Paralakhemundi.

== History ==
Manikeswari was earlier popularized by the Suryavansi Gajapatis in the 15th–16th centuries in the Puri region. Purushottama Deva Gajapati considered Manikeswari as the consort of Lord Jagannath and built a shrine for her at Chilika, which no longer exists. Manikeswari is also the royal family deity of Parlakhemundi, Badakhemundi, Sanakhemundi And Gadapur. She was installed in Bhawanipatna much later, around 1849 A.D., during the shifting of the capital from Junagarh. Some also mention Thumaul Rampur as her Adipitha, from where the deity was brought to Bhawanipatna. Uditnarayan Deo laid the foundation of the present modern temple at Bhawanipatna, which was completed in 1947 by Brajamohan Deo.

Manikeswari has been closely associated with Kalahandi’s history as the goddess of wealth (“Manik”). Numerous Manikeswari shrines exist across Odisha and Chhattisgarh—especially in the districts of Kandhamal, Koraput, Phulbani, Boudh, Bolangir, Sonepur, Ganjam, Gajapati, Angul, Dhenkanal, Keonjhar, Sundargarh, etc.—reflecting the influence of various rulers. Despite its deep roots and wide spread, the historical significance of Manikeswari in Odisha and Chhattisgarh has yet to be fully appreciated.

The deity of Gadapur Ganga Family, comprising the present-day districts of Kalahandi, Koraput and Bastar, was Manikya Debi or Manikeswari since around the 19th century A.D.

In the 19th century, during a period of political instability and attacks on Kalahandi Rajya, King Harichandra Deo struggled and died. His queen, Pitaleswari devi, left for her native place Gadapur Rajya (then ruled by the Ganga dynasty) in the present-day Kandhamal region.

While in Gadapur, Pitaleswari devi gave birth to the prince. The child grew up deeply attached to Goddess Maa Manikeswari, who was worshipped there in her Vaishnavi form as the Ishta devi of the Gadapur Ganga family. When peace returned to Kalahandi, the people requested the prince to return and rule. Because of his emotional connection to Maa Manikeswari, he sought the permission of the Gadapur king to bring the goddess with him. The Gadapur Ganga family, being the hereditary custodians of the deity, denied the transfer but allowed the prince to take the umbrella (symbolic representation) of Maa Manikeswari instead.

Thus, the umbrella of Maa Manikeswari was brought to Kalahandi, and over time the region became famous for the grand Maa Manikeswari Chaitra Jatra. Few people today know that this Jatra originated first in Gadapur before it was celebrated in Kalahandi. The original idol of Maa Manikeswari still exists in the Ganga family temple at present-day Gadapur near Daringibadi in Kandhamal district, worshipped in her Vaishnavi form.

== Manikeswari Temples ==
- Bhawanipatna
- Paralakhemundi
- Machamara, Gajapati
- Gadapur, Kandhamal
- Thuamul Rampur
- Jugasaipatna
- Kashipur, Rayagada
- Sonepur, Subarnapur
- Himgir, Sundargarh

=== Chhatar Jatra ===
Every year a festival called “Chhatar Jatra” at a particular time is organised and many people who have fulfilled wishes come and sacrifice animals in the name of goddess. Chatar jatra is celebrated during September–October, Durga Puja, in Bhawanipatna.
