= Shivnath River =

Coordinates: 21.7295°N 82.4758°E

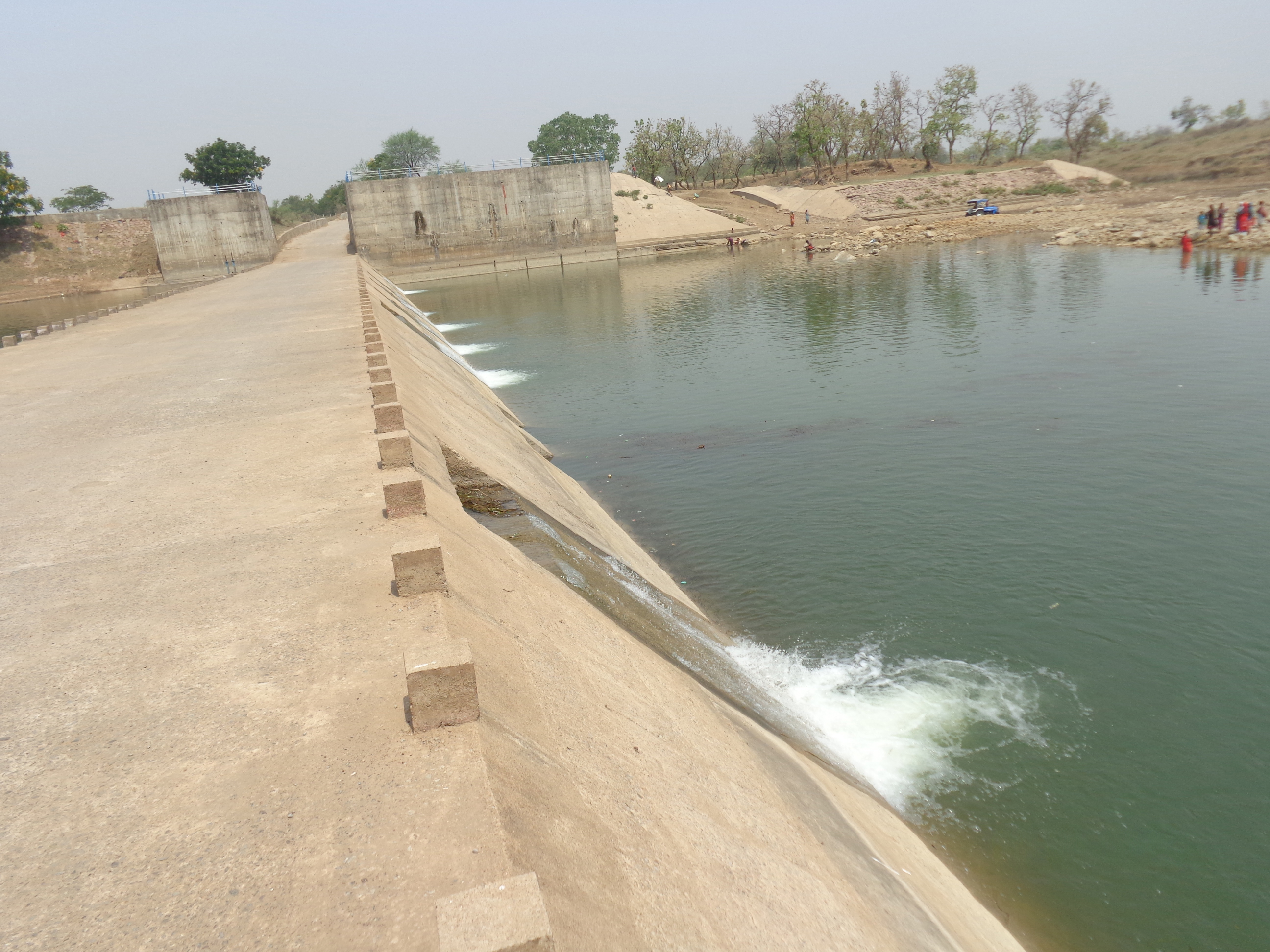

Location
- Country: India
- State: Chhattisgarh
- City: Durg

Physical characteristics
- Source: Pana aras Hill
  - location: Rajnandgaon, Chhattisgarh
- Mouth: Mahanadi
  - location: Changori, Janjgir-Champa, Chhattisgarh, Chhattisgarh
- Length: 290 km (180 mi)
- Discharge
  - location: Mahanadi at Changori near Shivrinarayan

The Shivnath River, also called the Seonath River, is the longest tributary of the Mahanadi River, which joins it at Changori in the Janjgir-Champa district in Chhattisgarh, India). It has a total course of 290 kilometres (180 mi). The name comes from the god Shiva in Hinduism, making it one of the few rivers in India having a male name.

== Sources ==
The Shivnath originates from Godari village in Gadchiroli district, Maharashtra, and flows northeast for 300 kms then joins the Mahanadi river near the town Shivrinarayan in Chhattisgarh. Some record origination at Panabaras Hill, 624 metres (2,047 ft) above sea level in the Ambagarh Chowki division of Rajnandgaon District of Chhattisgarh.

== Course ==
The river flows in a northeast direction for 300 kilometres (190 mi) from its source then joins the Mahanadi River at Changori near the town Shivrinarayan.

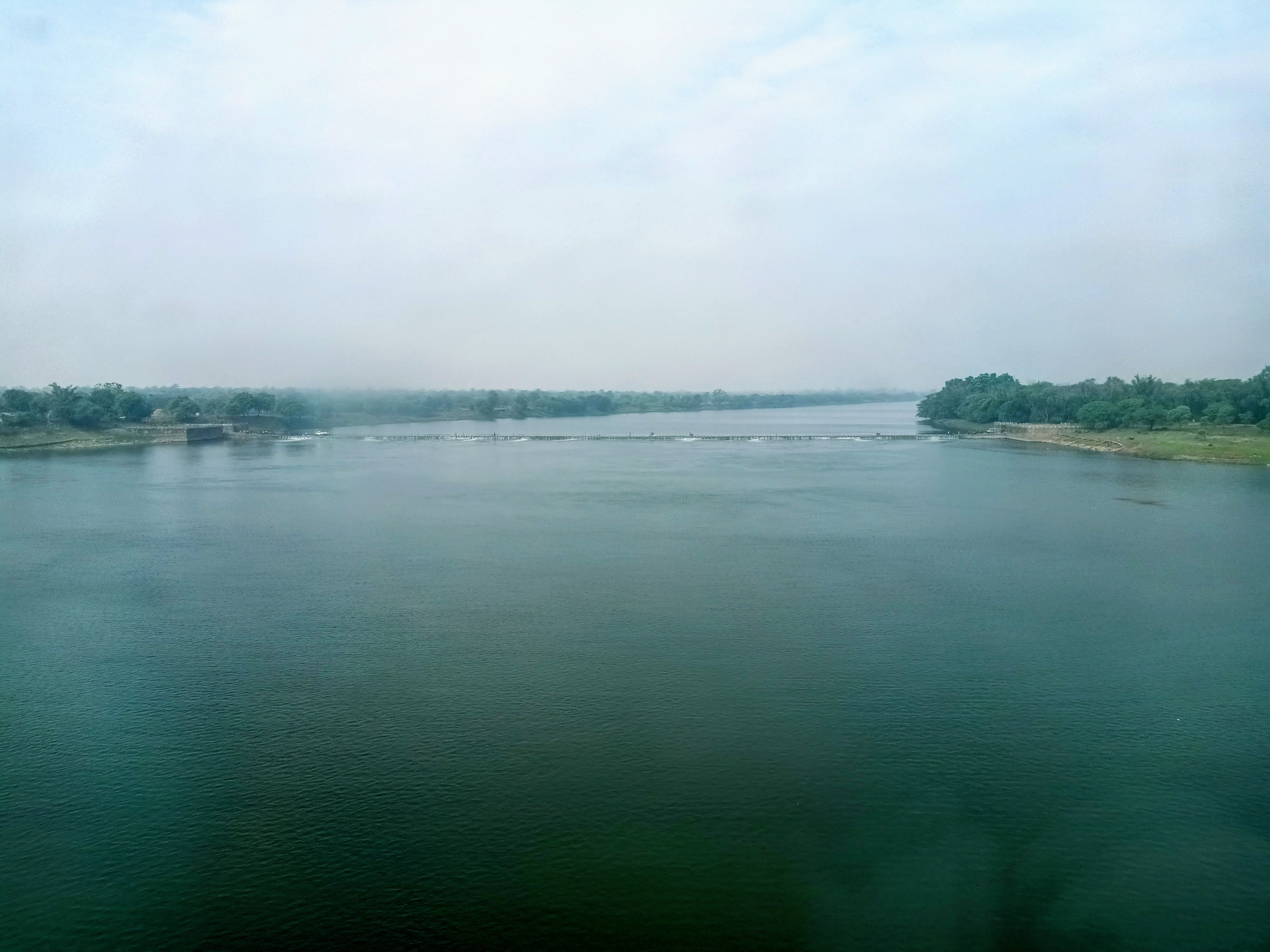
Shivnath River view from railway bridge near Bilaspur

== Sale ==
The river was sold by the government of Madhya Pradesh to Radius Water Limited in 1998, to much controversy by locals. Arvind Kejriwal discussed this controversy in his book Swaraj.
