= Ram Van Gaman Path =

Religious tourism circuit

Ram Van Gaman Path is the path that Lord Rama, Sita and Lakshmana took during their 'vanvaas' or exile years. It starts from Ayodhya and ends at Sri Lanka. This path is much revered in the Hindu religion as various key incidents of Lord Rama's life have taken place on this path.

As per Ramayana, Lord Rama through his wandering years traveled from India to Sri Lanka. During his ‘vanvaas’ or exile, he was not allowed to stay in any village or town and live his life in a forest. Owing to this, after taking his leave from Ayodhya, Lord Rama wandered through the forests of Uttar Pradesh, Jharkhand, Chhattisgarh, Madhya Pradesh, Odisha, Karnataka, Telangana, Maharashtra and Tamil Nadu.

== Background ==
The Ram Janmbhoomi Andolan was a decisive point for the Ram Van Gaman Path. In 1991 the frenzy of this movement influenced the government to take an initiative to chalk out and trace the life and movement of Lord Rama. A total of 248 places have been identified across India with the objective to develop them into places of interest for the travelling populace.

== Locations ==
A total of 248 places have been identified within the nations of India and Sri Lanka that lie on the course of the Ram Van Gaman Path. There is a plan to develop these spots and showcase them as part of the socio-cultural and religious tourism circuit. Below mentioned are some of the most prominent ones.

=== Uttar Pradesh ===
A 177 km section of road has been in development in Uttar Pradesh as Ram Van Gaman Marg.

The most prominent places being developed are:

- Ayodhya
- Sultanpur
- Pratapgrah
- Prayagraj
- Chitrakoot

=== Chhattisgarh ===
Nine places in this region have been selected for inclusion in the first phase of development and restoration.

They are:

- Sitamarhi Harchowka (Koriya)
- Ramgarh (Surguja)
- Shivrinarayan (Janjgir-Champa)
- Turturia (Balodabazar)
- Chandkhuri (Raipur)
- Rajim (Gariaband)
- Sihava Saptarishi Ashram (Dhamtari)
- Jagdalpur (Bastar)
- Ramaram (Sukma).

=== Madhya Pradesh ===
The state government of Madhya Pradesh also plans to develop the Ram Van Gaman Path in 3 phases.

The following places in Madhya Pradesh are included in this project:

- Chitrakoot
- Amarkantak (Shahdol)
- Satna

=== Maharashtra ===
- Ramtek
- Nasik
- Tuljapur
- Naldurg

=== Karnataka ===
- Hampi
- Ramagiri
- Halu Rameshwara
- Sureban(near Belgaum) where Rama met Shabari

=== Andhra Pradesh/Telangana ===
- Bhadrachalam
- Lepakshi
- Parnasala
- Ramagundam
- Kaleswaram
- Keesaragutta(near Hyderabad)

=== Tamilnadu ===
- Thirunangur
- Rameshwaram
- Dhanushkodi
- Ram Setu

=== Sri Lanka ===
- Ram Setu

== Cultural and religious significance ==
In Hinduism, Rama (or Ramachandra) is the seventh avatar of the Hindu god Vishnu and one of the most sacred deities. Ramayana is one of the most prolific literatures in Hinduism. The earliest scripture of Ramayana was found to be written approximately between the 7th to 4th centuries BCE. Lord Rama's story is also seen as a key part of Hindu mythology, and is often used to teach moral lessons to masses.

The Ram Van Gaman Path is a step towards development of a tourism circuit by leveraging public sentiment and devotion, with major development works spread across the states of Uttar Pradesh, Chhattisgarh and Madhya Pradesh. According to Chhattisgarh's Chief Minister Bhupesh Baghel, "The ambitious project of 'Ram Van Gaman Tourism Circuit' aims to preserve memories linked to Lord Ram’s stay in Chhattisgarh during his exile from Ayodhya".

By developing this tourism circuit the Government aims to boost economy, infrastructure, investment and jobs in selected regions.

== See also ==
- Parikrama
- Yatra
- Ramayana circuit
