= Ānanda Bhaṭṭa =

Ānanda Bhaṭṭa was a 16th or 17th century Bengali Shaivaite commentator on Vedanta.

He is the author of the Vallalacharita, supposedly written at the behest of the Raja of Nabadvip, Buddhimanta Khan.
