= Jharan =

- Village
- Location in Gujarat, India Jharan (India)
- Coordinates: 20.9638444°N 73.7860276°E
- Country: India
- State: Gujarat
- District: Dang

Government
  - Type: Gram / Panchayat
  - Body: Subir Taluka / Panchayat
- Elevation: 408 m (1,339 ft)

Population (2011)
  - Total: 731

Languages
  - Official: Konkani, Gujarati, Hindi
- Time zone: UTC+5:30 (IST)
- PIN: 394716
- Vehicle registration: GJ 30

Jharan is a village in Dang district, Gujarat, India. It is located in the Subir taluka.

According to the 2011 census, it has a population of 731.
