= Shivrinarayan =

Sheorinarayan
- Town
- Location in Chhattisgarh, India Sheorinarayan (India)
- Coordinates: 21.73°N 82.58°E
- Country: India
- State: Chhattisgarh
- District: Janjgir-Champa
- Elevation: 235 m (771 ft)

Population (2001)
  - Total: 8,107

Languages
  - Official: Hindi, Chhattisgarhi
- Time zone: UTC+5:30 (IST)
- Vehicle registration: CG

Shivrinarayan also known as Sheorinarayan is a town and a nagar panchayat located at the Triveni Dhara of Mahanadi, Shivnath and Jonk River in Janjgir-Champa district in the Indian state of Chhattisgarh.

== Ramayana ==
Shivrinarayan has a significant role in the life of Lord Rama. Lord Rama along with his wife Sita and his younger brother Lakshaman had started his Vanvas (exile) in the Bastar district (more precisely Dandakaranya region) of Chhattisgarh. They lived more than 10 years of their total 14 years of Vanvas (forest exile) in different places of Chhattisgarh. One of the notable places is Shivrinarayan which is located in Janjgir-Champa district of Chhattisgarh state. Shivrinarayan was named after an old female ascetic named Shabari.

When Ram visited Shabari she said "I do not have anything to offer other than my heart, but here are some berry fruits. May it please you, my Lord." Saying so, Shabari offered the fruits she had meticulously collected to Rama. When Rama was tasting them, Lakshmana raised the concern that Shabari had already tasted them and therefore unworthy of eating. To this Rama said that of the many types of food he had tasted, "nothing could equal these berry fruits, offered with such devotion. You taste them, then alone will you know. Whomsoever offers a fruit, leaf, flower or some water with love, I partake it with great joy."

== Geography ==
Sheorinarayan is located at 21.73°N 82.58°E. It has an average elevation of 235 m (771 ft).

== Demographics ==
As of 2001 India census, Sheorinarayan had a population of 8107. Males constitute 52% of the population and females 48%. Sheorinarayan has an average literacy rate of 63%, higher than the national average of 59.5%: male literacy is 73%, and female literacy is 53%. In Sheorinarayan, 18% of the population is under 6 years of age.

== Shivrinarayan Math ==
Shivrinarayan Math is centuries old Hindu temple as well as institution located in the town of Shivrinarayan. It was established during the eighth century. It is a heritage centre and bears tremendous importance from Historical and Religious perspective.

== Ram Van Gaman Path ==
Shivrinarayan is one of the 9 spots identified by the State Government which will be restored and developed as an integral part of Ram Van Gaman Path. Shivrinarayan is the place where Shabri tasted the berry fruits for their sweetness to be given to Lord Rama.

Ram Van Gaman Path connects the places where Lord Rama halted during his exile expanding from the North of Chhattisgarh (Koriya) to the South (Sukma). The State Government has earmarked 75 places out of which 9 will be developed in the first phase.
