= Anantavarman Chodaganga =

Eastern Ganga emperor from 1078 to 1150

- Raja Parameswara; Trikalingaadhipati; Gangesvara; Paramavaishnava; Paramabhattaraka; Paramabrahmanya; Kunjaradhipati
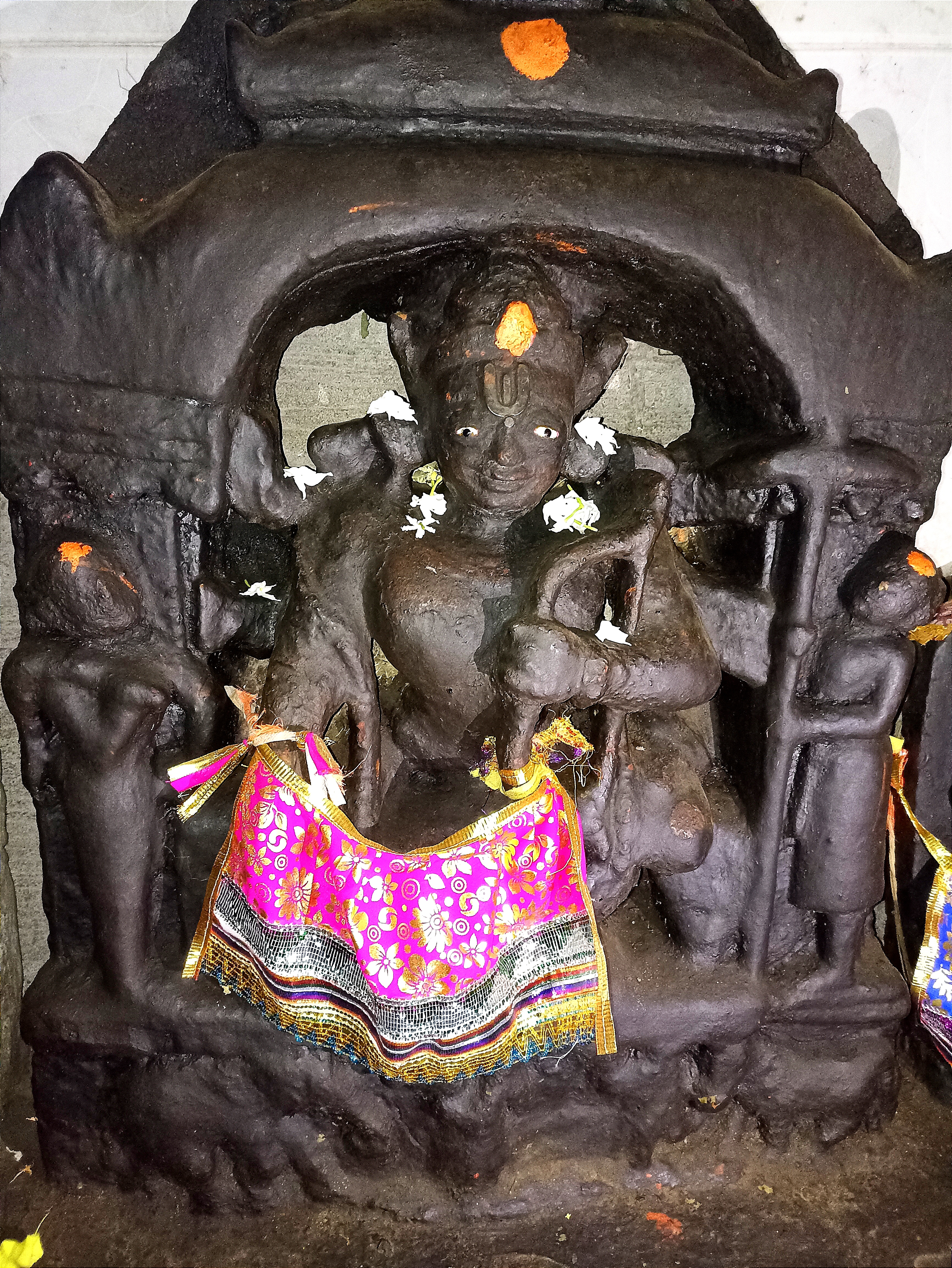
- Sculpture of Chodaganga Deva at Chudanga Sahi, Puri

Eastern Ganga emperor
- Reign: 17 February 1078 – 1150
- Coronation: 17 February 1078
- Predecessor: Rajaraja Deva I
- Successor: Kamarnnava Deva
- Born: Kalinganagari, Kalinga, Eastern Ganga dynasty (modern day Srimukhalingam, Andhrapradesh)
- Died: 1150; Kataka, Kalinga, Eastern Ganga dynasty (modern day Cuttack, Odisha)
- Spouse: Chodadevi; Kasturikamodini; Indira devi; Lakshmi; Chandralekha; Prithvi-Mahadevi; Somala-Mahadevi
- Issue: Kamarnnava Deva; Raghava; Raja Raja II; Aniyanka Bhima; Umavallabha
Regnal name
- Kunjaradhipati Gangesvara Anantavarman Chodaganga deva
- House: Eastern Ganga dynasty
- Father: Rajaraja Deva I
- Mother: Rajasundari
- Religion: Hinduism

Gangesvara Anantavarman Chodaganga Deva (died 1150) was the Eastern Ganga emperor from 1078 until his death in 1150. He was a great patron of arts and architecture who built many temples, one of them being the Jagannath Temple in Puri. He was the ruler of the Kalinga region from river Ganga to Godavari and later the early medieval Odisha region with the incorporation of the constituent regions with the decline of the Somavamshis. He is often considered as the founder and significant ruler of Eastern Ganga dynasty. He is related to the Chola dynasty through his mother's side and the Eastern Gangas through his father's side. His mother, Rajasundari, was a Chola princess and the daughter of emperor Virarajendra Chola and granddaughter of Chola king Rajendra Chola I. His father was king Rajaraja Devendravarman of the Eastern Ganga dynasty. He possessed a vast number of elephants which made him used the title navanavati sahasta kunjaradhisvara or the lord of ninety-nine thousand elephants, though this is an exaggeration but it is likely that he possessed a vast number of elephants.

According to Ānanda Bhaṭṭa's Vallala-charitam, Anantavarman had diplomatic relations with Vijaya Sena of Bengal.

Anantavarman ruled for a very long reign of 72 years according to his own inscription. This makes him one of the longest ruling monarchs in the Middle Ages. He was succeeded by his son Kamarnava Deva from the queen Kasturikamodini.

== Life and reign ==
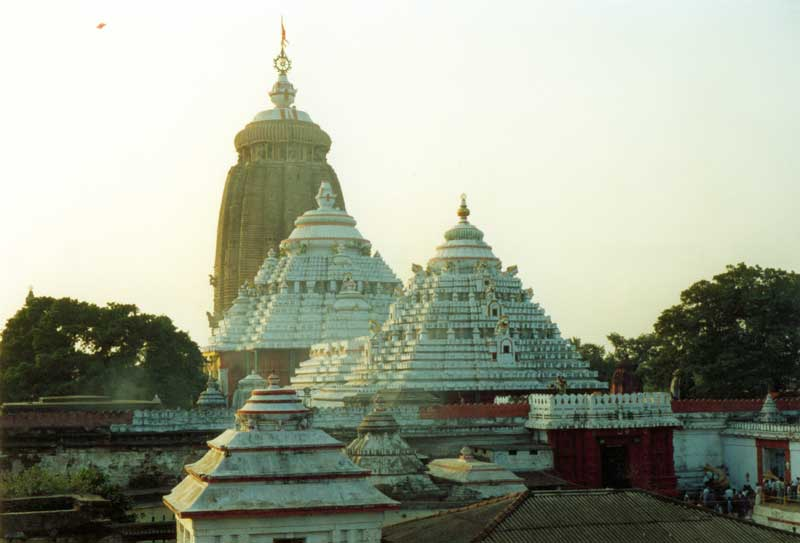
Present Jagannath temple in Puri built by Anantavarman Chodaganga.

He was the son of Rajaraja Deva I alias Devendravarman and Kalinga Mahadevi Rajasundari and grandson of Trikalingadhipati Anantavarman Vajrahasta Deva V. Anantavarman's mother Rajasundari was the daughter of emperor Virarajendra Chola and granddaughter of Chola king Rajendra Chola I. However, historian S.N. Sen states that Anantavarman was the maternal grandson of Kulottunga I.

The Jagannath Temple at Puri was rebuilt in the 11th century atop its ruins by Anantavarman Chodaganga. He was known as the first Gajapati/Kunjaradhiparti as per Ronaki Stone inscription. Emperor Chodaganga was originally a Shaivite from Srimukhalingam. But he embraced Sri Vaishnavism under the influence of Ramanuja when the latter visited the Sri Jagannath Puri temple.

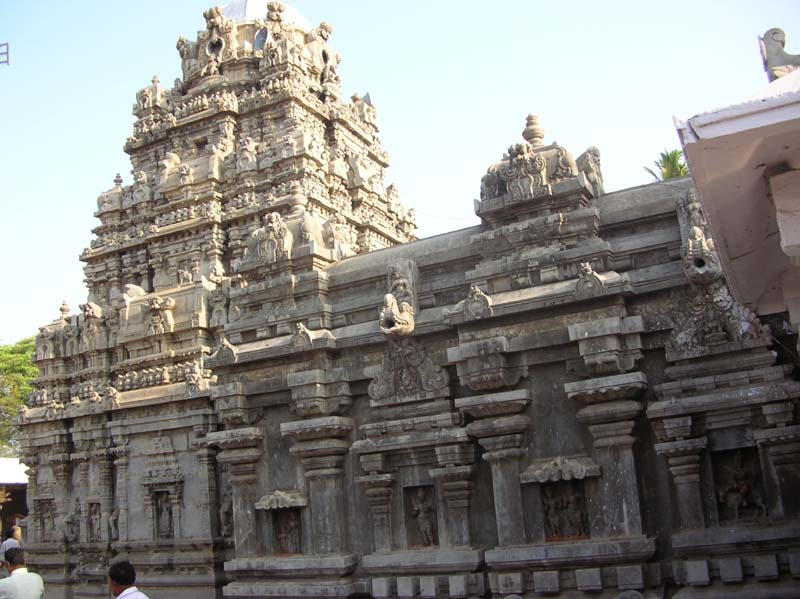
In saka 1035 CE Anantavarman Chodaganga Deva converted the Kurmanathaswamy temple to a Vaishnava khetra from a Siva temple.

In his Sindurapura grant (1118 A.D) Anantavarma styles himself Paramavaishnava. He re-established Kurmanathaswamy temple, Srikurmam after Ramanuja's visit to Kalinga. Despite being related to Anantavarman, Kulothunga Chola I did not stop from burning Anantavarman's empire. Tamil historians propose that it was probably because the king failed to pay his rent for two consecutive years. He was ousted by Kulothunga's general Karunakara Thondaiman and this victory is detailed in the Tamil classic Kalingattupparani. However, this could be a far fetch from the actual truth considering that such poems often exaggerate the Kings they are praising and often overlook the defeats the Kings have faced. Monarchs from this region of the subcontinent regularly assumed the title Chodaganga Deva throughout the ancient and medieval periods to allude to their Chola and Eastern Ganga heritage.

From various inscriptions it is known that King Anantavarman Chodaganga Deva established the present temple some time near the end of the eleventh century. A copper plate inscription made by King Rajaraja III found on the Tirumala Venkateswara Temple near the north entrance states that Jagannath temple was built by Gangesvara, i.e., Anantavarman Chodaganga Deva.

Later, King Ananga Bhima Deva II (1170–1198) did much to continue the work of Chodaganga Deva, building the walls around the temple and many of the other shrines on the temple grounds. He is thus often considered one of the builders of the temple. He also did much to establish the regulations around the service to the Deity.

A scion of this dynasty made extensive donations to the Koneswaram temple, Trincomalee on Puthandu, 1223 CE in the name of King Chodaganga Deva. Shortly afterwards, the Konark temple was constructed in Odisha. A brother of the king titled Ulagaikonda Permadi is known to us from several inscriptions.

== Administration ==
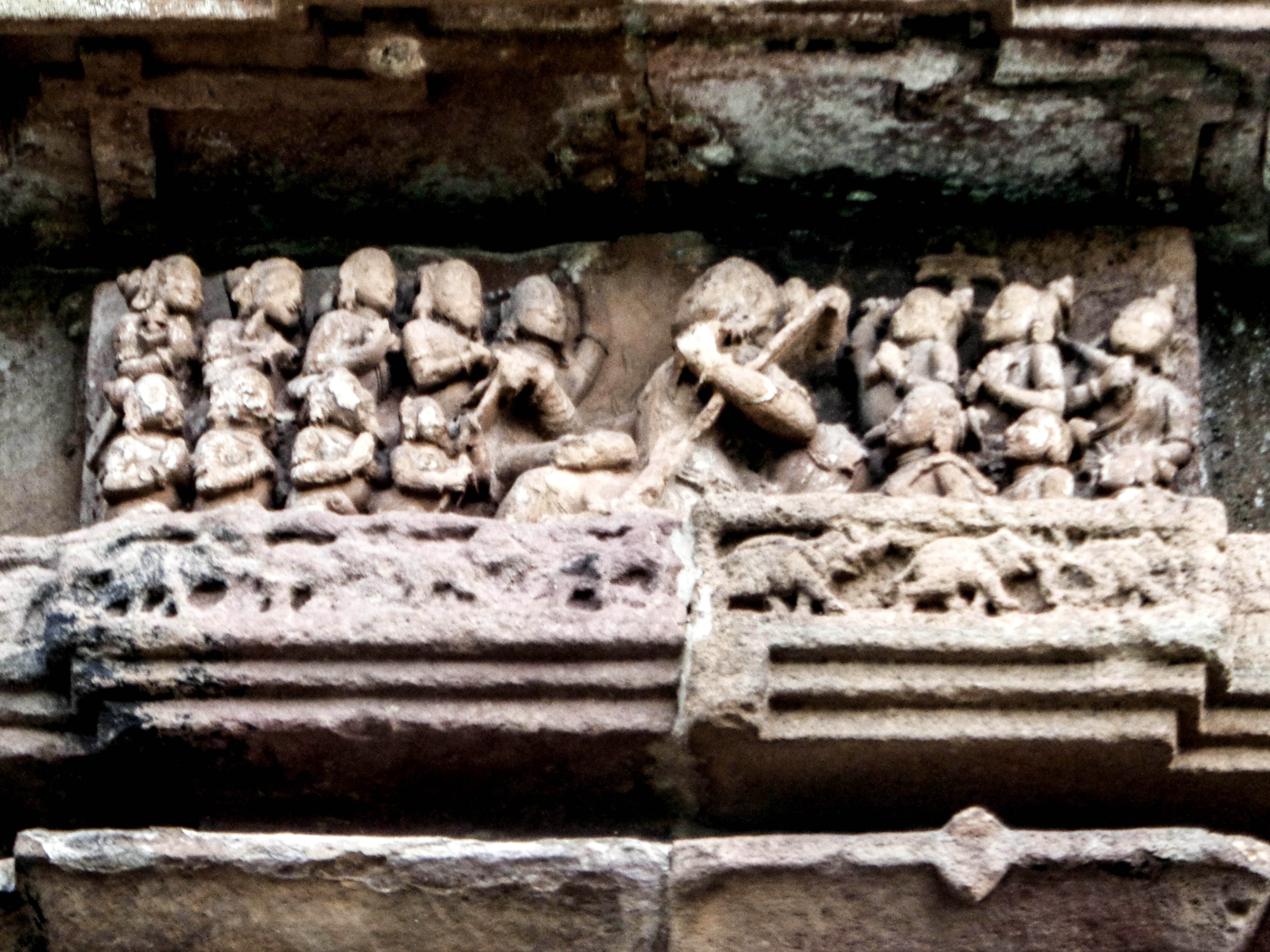
A depiction of Eastern Ganga Emperor Chodaganga Deva.. a Royal court scene at Buddhanath Temple, Garedi Panchana.

Anantavarman's Capital was Kataka. Puri had a great religious importance where the king built the magnificent Jagannath Temple, influenced by Ramanuja. The king's inscription sheds light on a well organized form of administration. Empire was divided into several mandalams or provinces and each mandala into several Vishayas or districts and each Vishaya into several gramas or villages. there are several nadus mentioned in the inscription and most of the villages or agraharas granted to Brahmins or temples or ministers or commanders are found in these nadus.

Rastrakuta Pramukhas or Janapada ministers are exempted from paying taxes, they advise the king in several matters.

Several officers both civil and military are mentioned in the inscriptions such as:

- Karanam
- Purohit
- Puravasi
- Talvari
- Dandanayaka
- Dandapasi
- Raja Guru
- Maha Pradain
- Mahasenapati
- Mahamandalika

The King's Revenue was derived from tributes, custom dues and crown lands. Royal expenditure was divided into four kinds:

- Administrative charges
- Religious benefactions
- Public works
- Household expenses

=== Coinage ===
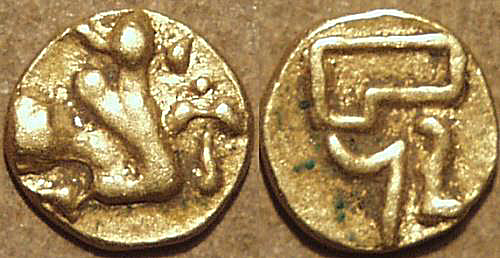
Gold fanam of Anantavarman Chodaganga depicting a Bull (Reverse) and saka year

The Coinage under Chodaganga are of varied type and metals such as:

- Madas
- Ganda-Madas
- Malla-Madas
- Matsya-Madas
- Ganga-Madas
- Fanams
- Tankas (Gold, Silver, Copper)
- Chinuams

== Conquests ==
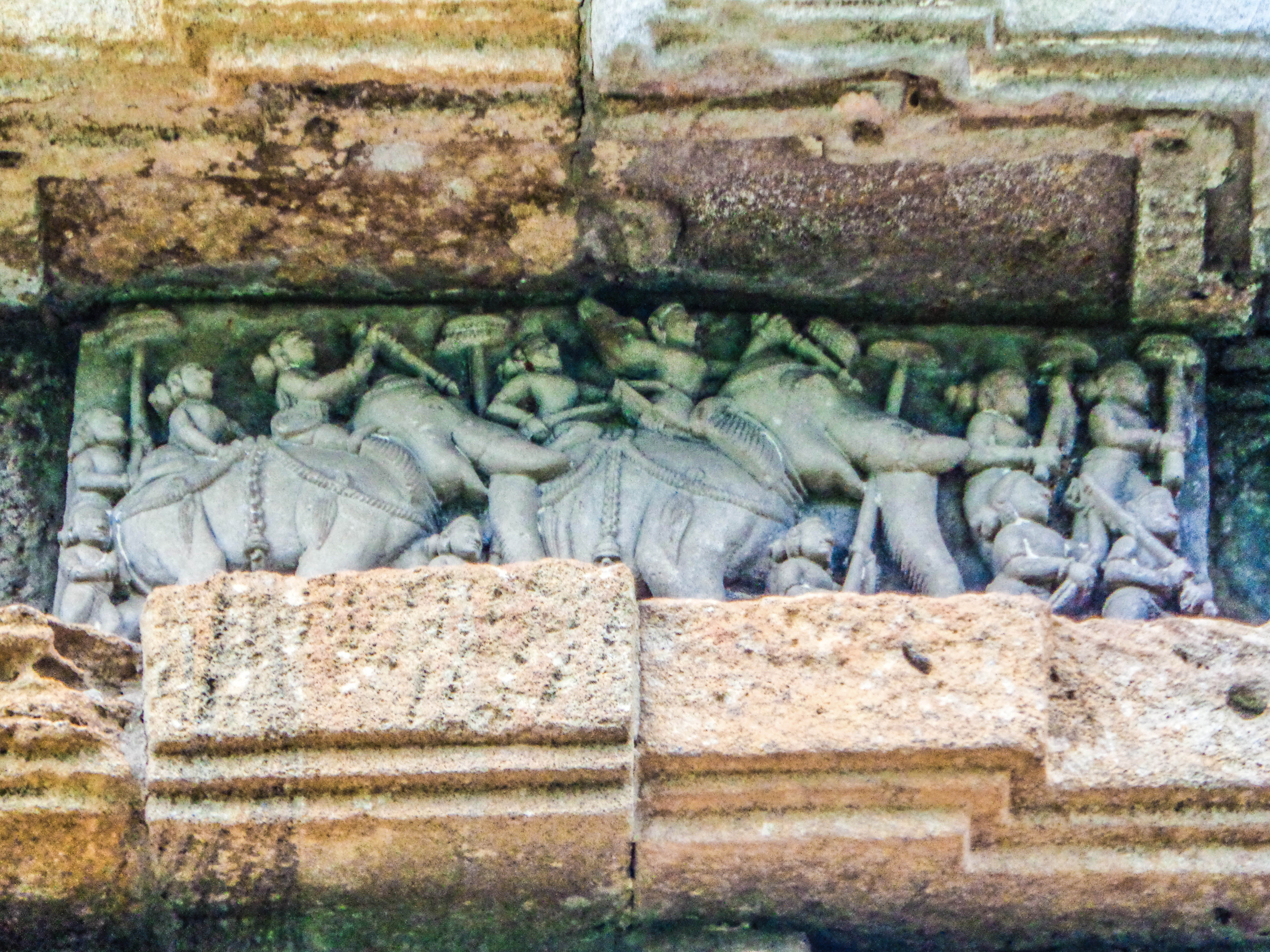
A Royal elephant procession depiction of Chodaganga Deva along with his consort possibly Gundi Chodi Debi at Buddhanath Temple, Garedi Panchana.

Anantavarman was a benevolent and absolute ruler who was served by several faithful generals, commanders and ministers who assisted him in his conquests, some of whom were; Banapati, the Brahmin general who served his father in Vengi campaigns; and took Kimidi, Kosala, Oddadesa and was made a governor; Pinnayabhata a learned Brahmin; Sommula Rechana the foreign minister.

=== Conquest of Utkala ===
According to the Sindurapura grant issued in the saka year 1040 (1118 A.D), Anantavarman Chodaganga had sovereignty over entire of the whole Utkala. Madalapanji states that he defeated the last Kesari king Mahasivagupta and shifted the capital to Chaudwar Cuttack.

=== Conquest of Vengi ===
Vengi kingdom was being ruled by Kulotthunga Chola who was related to Anantavarman Chodaganga from his mother's side. After the death of Kulottunga in 1118 AD vengi came under the rule of Vikramchola, But Vikramchola left the Vengi viceroyalty to Velnati Cholas. As there was no strong ruler in Vengi, the kingdom suffered from internal strife and foreign invasions. It seems that Chodaganga saw this as an advantage and conquered the part of Vengi lying north to river Godavari. but was failed to conquer the whole of Vengi.

=== Conquest of Bengal ===
Bengal was being ruled by the Pala dynasty, which ruled over Bengal from 8th century to 11th century. After the death of Rampala, Chodagangadeva attacked Bengal beyond Danda Bhukti.

According to the inscription by his successors, Anantavarman Chodagangadeva defeated the king of mandara. The accounts describe how Anantavavarman destroyed the fortified town of Aramya. The location of Aramya has been identified as modern-day Arambagh, situated approximately eight miles from Garh Mandaran.

== Extent of the Empire ==
Kalinga remained formidable under Anantavavarman. According to his own inscription and those of his successors it seems that Anantavarman's empire extended to river Godavari in the south, the city of midnapore in the north, the bay of Bengal in the east and the Eastern ghats in the west.

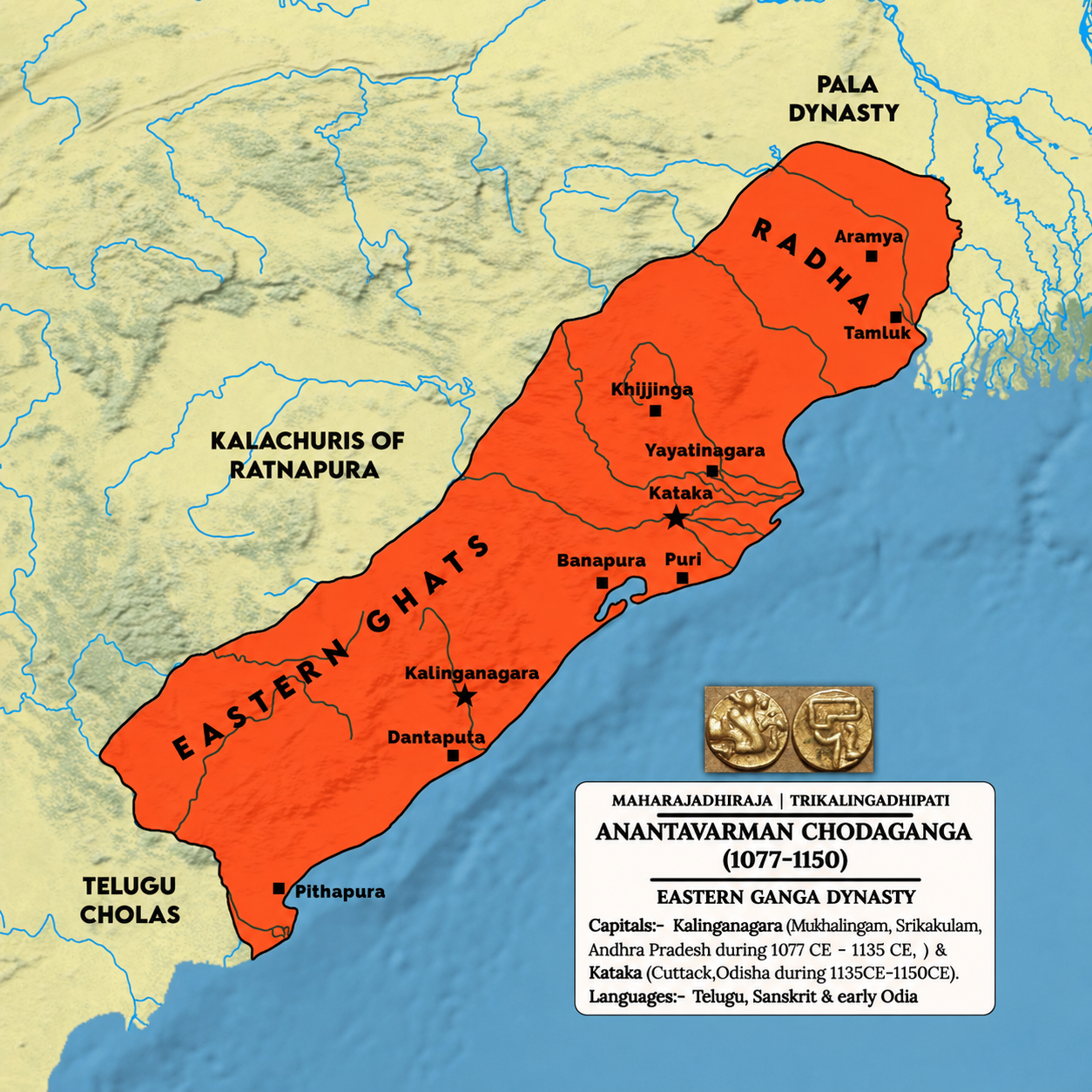
Eastern Ganga empire under Anantavarman chodaganga.

== Family ==
Family of Anantavarman Chodaganga

Panchavan Mahadevi | Rajaraja I | Tribhuvana Mahadevi
Araiyan Rajarajan | Rajendra I | Mukkokilan Adigal
Rajadhiraja I | Rajendra II | Virarajendra Chola | Arulmolinangai | Amangai Devi
Rajaraja Devendravarman | Rajasundari | Athirajendra Chola
Anantavarman Chodaganga

== Art and Architecture ==
Anantavarman was a patron of arts. Bhasvati, a work on astronomy, was composed in the Saka year 1021 (1099 A.D) by Satananda, Son of Sankara, an inhabitant of Puri. The tradition of keeping records in Madala Panji, the Odia chronicle is believed to be started with Anantavarman Chodagangadeva.

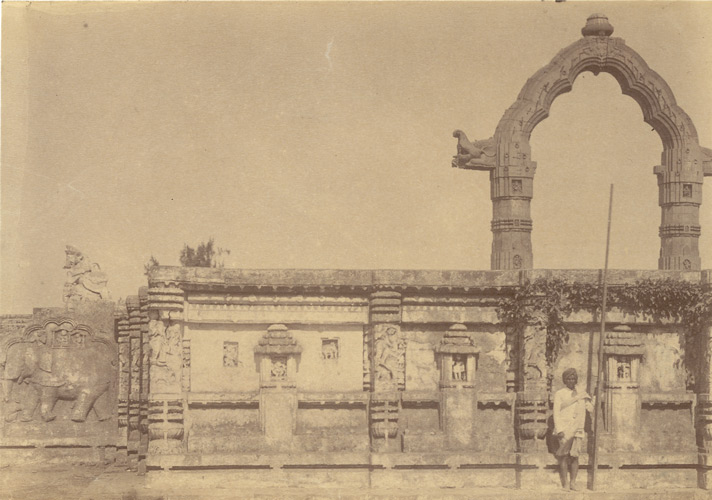
The main shrine, with a towered sanctuary and mandapa with a pyramidal roof, is attributed to Anantavarman Chodaganga of the Eastern Ganga dynasty (r.1077-1147).

He is credited with the construction of the Jagannath temple at puri. According to Mr. Manmohan Chakravarti the Vimana and the Mandapa and the Jagmohana were erected by Chodaganga towards the close of 11th Century.

He was a great patron of architecture. According to a Sanskrit inscription excavated from the Koneswaram Temple, Chodaganga Deva made rich donations to the temple after visiting the temple on Tamil New Years Day.

== Sources ==
- Sastri, K. A. Nilakanta (2000) [1935]. The Cōlas. Madras: University of Madras. pp. 322–323.
