= Vishnuvardhan =

Vishnuvardhan or Vishnuvardhana may refer to:

- Vishnuvardhan (actor), Kannada film actor
- Bharathi Vishnuvardhan, Kannada film actress
- Vishnuvardhan (director), Tamil film director
- Vishnu Vardhan (tennis), Indian tennis player
- Vishnuvardhan (ruler), 6th-century ruler of Malwa, in central India, associated with Yasodharman
- Vishnuvardhana, a 12th-century king of the Hoysala Empire in present-day Indian state of Karnataka
- Vishnuvardhana (Varika king), in northern India during the Gupta era
- Kubja Vishnuvardhana, 7th-century Indian monarch, founder of the Eastern Chalukyas
- Vishnuvardhana II, 7th-century Indian monarch of the Eastern Chalukyas
- Vishnuvardhana IV, 8th-century Indian monarch of the Eastern Chalukyas
- Vishnuvardhana (film), 2011 Indian Kannada-language comedy thriller film
