= List of ancient Jain temples =

List of Ancient Jain temples

Name	Location	Period	Citation
Kulpakji	Aler	2,000 years old	
Subai Jain temples	Koraput	4th century CE	
Pataini temple	Unchehara	5th century CE	
Shreyansh Giri	Nachna	5th century CE	
Kanakagiri Jain tirth	Chamarajanagar	5th century CE	
Meguti Jain temple	Aihole	5th century CE	
Aihole Jain cave	Aihole	6th century CE	
Vijayamangalam Jain temple	Vijayamangalam	678 CE	
Humcha Jain temples	Humcha	7th century CE	
Lakshmeshwara Jain temples	Lakshmeshwara	7th century CE	
Ambapuram cave temple	Vijayawada	7th century CE	
Guru Basadi	Moodabidri	714 CE	
Panchasara Jain temple	Patan	746 CE	
Mahavira Jain temple, Osian	Osian	783 CE	
Trilokyanatha Temple	Kanchipuram	8th century CE	
Jain temples at Deogarh	Deogarh	8th century CE	
Danavulapadu Jain temple	Danavulapadu village, Kadapa	8th century CE	
Jain temples at Anjaneri	Anjaneri, Nashik, Maharashtra	12th century CE	
Taranga Jain temple	Kheralu	1161 CE	
Jain temples, Halebidu	Halebidu	12th century CE	

== See also ==
- List of largest Jain temples
