= Ambapuram cave temple =

Jain temple in the state of Andhra Pradesh

Ambapuram Jain cave temple

Religion
- Affiliation: Jainism
- Deity: Mahavira

Location
- Location: Ambapuram village near Vijayawada, Andhra Pradesh
- Interactive map of Ambapuram Jain cave temple
- Coordinates: 16°34′04.4″N 80°37′27.7″E

Architecture
- Style: Rock-cut architecture
- Creator: Kubja Vishnuvardhana
- Established: 7th century CE

Specifications
- Temple: 1
- Monument: 5
- Materials: Rock cut

Ambapuram cave temple or Nedumbi Basadi is a rock-cut Jain cave temple in Ambapuram village near Vijayawada in the Indian state of Andhra Pradesh. The cave is attributed to Kubja Vishnuvardhana, the founder of the Vengi Chalukya dynasty, and is dated to the early 7th century CE. It was dedicated to Parshvanatha and Mahavira and also contains a representation of Ambika.

== History ==
Jainism became popular in the Vijayawada region during the reign of Eastern Chalukyas or Vengi Chalukyas in the 7th century CE. During the 7th—8th century CE, a total of five Jain caves were constructed in Ambapuram and Adavinekkalam hills. According to the history of South India published by Pondicherry University, in the early 7th century CE, Kubja Vishnuvardhana, founder of the Vengi Chalukya dynasty, constructed a rock-cut Jain cave at Ambapuram.

The cave was dedicated to Parshvanatha and Mahavira. It also houses an image of Ambika, described in the source as the patron goddess. The village derives from the image of Goddess Ambika inside the Jain cave temple. The monument is referred to as Nedumbi Basadi in inscriptions.

== Architecture ==
The cave temple enshrines three cells — Veranda, antarala and garbhagriha. The verandah has plain walls and ceilings devoid of sculptures. The antharala features images of yaksha on either side of the door and an idol of Parshvanatha having a serpent hood with five heads. The antharala has an image of Goddess Ambika as protector deity and a carving of an unidentified deity. There is an image of chauri (whisk) bearers on each side of Mahavira. The rear wall of the garbhagriha houses an idol of Mahavira, the 24th Tirthankara, in lotus position with the symbol of lion stamped on the pedestal. The cave temple also features a rock-cut miniature Jain stupa. A 3 feet (0.91 m) tall idol of Parshvanatha with 7 hooded serpent in Kayotsarga posture. The idols date back to 7th century during the reign of Kubja Vishnuvardhana (c. 624–641 CE).

In 2019, Cultural Centre of Vijayawada, RCV along with 70 students organised a trek to promote tourism to this cave temple.

== Historical significance ==
Ambapuram represents an early phase of Jain architectural patronage under the Vengi Chalukyas. Pondicherry University's survey notes that the Vengi Chalukyas constructed Jain temples during their earlier period and identifies the Ambapuram cave as a work of Kubja Vishnuvardhana. The cave is therefore significant as a surviving example of Jain rock-cut architecture associated with the formative period of the Eastern Chalukya kingdom in the early 7th century.

== Conservation ==
The monument has suffered from inadequate accessibility and maintenance. In 2015, The Hindu reported that the caves were in a neglected condition and lacked a proper pathway for visitors.

== See also ==
- Danavulapadu Jain temple
- Bommalagutta
- Kulpakji
