= List of largest Jain temples =

This list shows the largest Jain bands in India.

1. Shree adijin band (Goregaon, Mumbai )

== Current largest Jain temples ==
Rank	Name of the temple	Photo	Area (m^{2})	Place	Country	Notes
1	Shree Pavapuri Tirth Dham		650,000	Rajasthan	India	Shree Pavapuri Tirth Dham was built by K. P. Sanghvi Group in 2001. The temple premises comprises a Jain temple complex and Animal Welfare center.
2	Manilakshmi Jain Tirth		178,062	Gujarat	India	
3	Digamber Jain Bada Mandir		161,874	Uttar Pradesh	India	Shri Digamber Jain Bada Mandir is a 220-year-old Jain temple complex located in Hastinapur.
4	Jambudweep		121,406	Uttar Pradesh	India	Jambudweep built under the blessings of Gyanmati Mataji in 1972. Jambudweep in Hastinapur is a depiction of Jambudvipa.
5	Nemawar Jain temple		84,984	Madhya Pradesh	India	Nemawar Jain temple has 26 shrines. One temple is 151 feet (46 m) high housing idols of Panchbalayati. Sahasrakoot Jinalaya, 2nd temple, made of yellow stone enshrines 1008 idols. 12 temples in two lines surrounding first and second temple, each housing 3 idols.
6	Ahichchhatra Chaubisi temple		17,500	Uttar Pradesh	India	Ahichchhatra is believed to be the place where Parshvanatha, the 23rd Tirthankar of Jainism, attained Kevala Jnana (omniscience). The Chaubisi temple is located near the old Digambara Jain temple.
7	Sarvodaya Jain temple		16,000	Madhya Pradesh	India	Sarvodaya Jain temple construction started under the guidance of Acharya Vidyasagar in 2006. The temple, is being constructed using lime and preserved stones. The temple complex constructed without cement and iron. The mulnayak of the temple is a 24 feet (7.3 m) tall Ashtadhatu idol of Rishabhanatha in Padmasan posture.
8	Padampura		4,600	Rajasthan	India	Padampura Jain temple was built in 1944 CE upon discovered of a red stone idol of Padmaprabha. Padampura temple is a famous Jain pilgrimage and famous for miracles. The main attraction of the temple is a 27 feet (8.2 m) colossus of Padamprabha in kayotsarga posture.
9	Ranakpur Jain temple		4,500	Rajasthan	India	Ranakpur Jain temple was built Dharna Shah, a Porwal from Ghanerao under the patronage of Rana Kumbha, in 1435 CE.} This temple is famous for its intricate carvings and unique architecture. The 15th-century temple dedicated to Adinatha built using white marble in the midst of a forest. The temple name is credited to its design of chaumukha— with four faces, built in the form of Nalini-Gulma Vimana(a heavenly vehicle).
10	Kulpakji		4,050	Telangana	India	Kulpakji also Kolanupaka Temple is a 2,000 year-old temple. The interior of the temple is made by red sandstone and white marble. Lord Rishabha, popularly called Adinath Bhagvan, was the first Tirthankar in Jainism. The statue of Lord Mahaveer is 130 centimetres (51 in) tall and is said to be made of a single piece of jade. Idols of Lord Simandar Swami and Mata Padmavati are installed on either side of the main temple.

== See also ==
- List of Jain temples
- List of ancient Jain temples
