= Ramateertham =

- Village
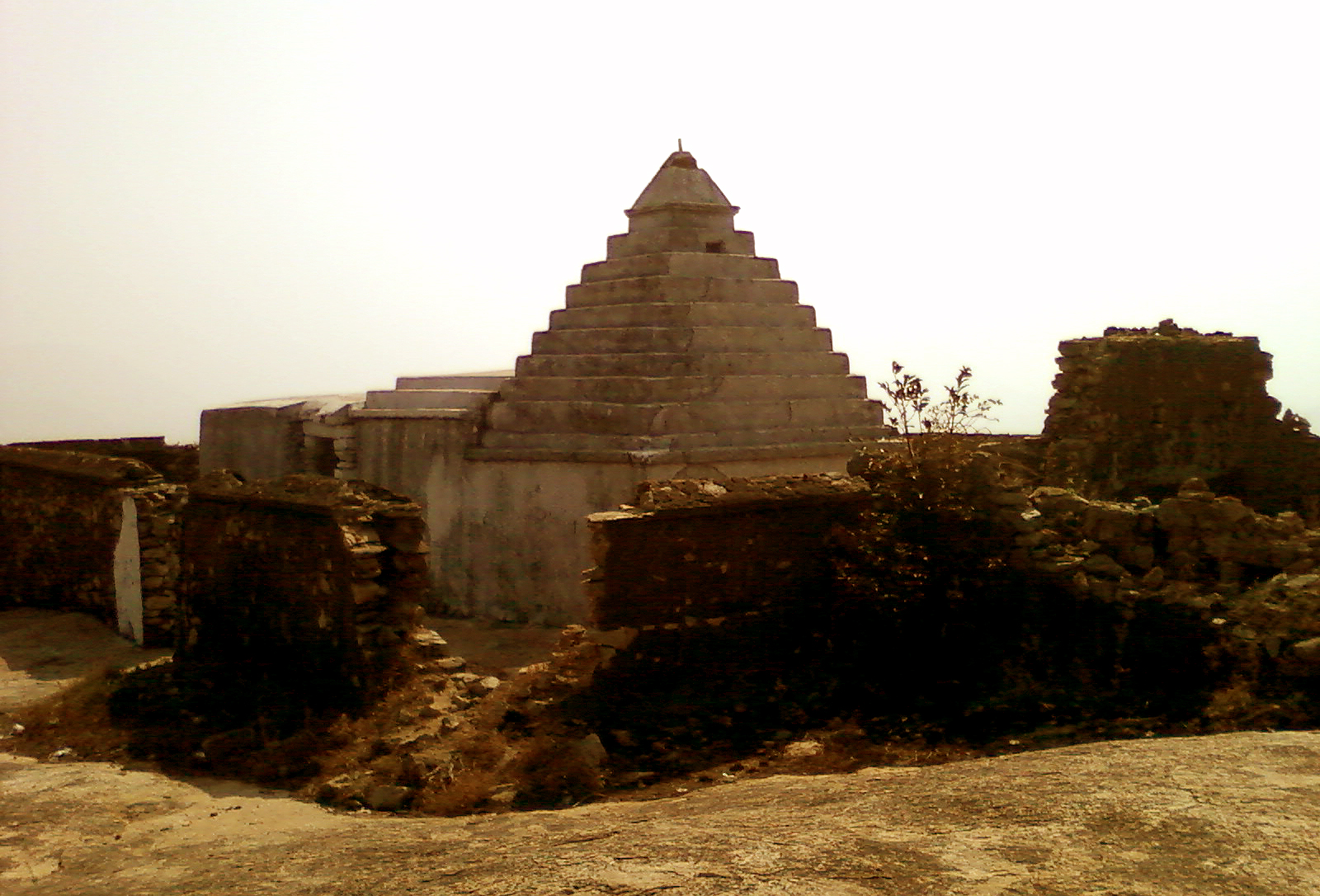
- 1000-year-old Sri Rama temple on top of Bodhikonda
- Interactive map of Ramateertham
- Location in Andhra Pradesh, India Ramateertham (India)
- Coordinates: 18.167913°N 83.495057°E
- Country: India
- State: Andhra Pradesh
- District: Vizianagaram

Languages
  - Official: Telugu
- Time zone: UTC+5:30 (IST)
- PIN: 535218
- Vehicle registration: AP-35
- Nearest city: Visakhapatnam
- Vidhan Sabha constituency: Nellimarla

Ramateertham (also spelled Ramatheertham) is a village and panchayat in Nellimarla mandal of Vizianagaram district in the Indian state of Andhra Pradesh. It is located about 12 kilometres from Vizianagaram city. The village is known for the Kodanda Rama temple and for archaeological remains of Buddhist and Jain sites located on the surrounding hills. ruined Jain temple on Bodhikonda]]

== History and Archaeology ==
The hills surrounding Ramateertham namely Bodhikonda, Ghanikonda, and Gurubhaktulakonda contain remnants of ancient Buddhist monasteries, stupas, and rock-cut caves, indicating that the region was an important centre of Buddhist activity during the early historic period. Jain caves and relief sculptures have also been identified in the area, reflecting the presence of Jain religious traditions alongside Buddhism and later Hindu worship practices.

== Rama Temple ==
Ramateertham is home to the Kodanda Rama temple, dedicated to Lord Rama, which serves as an important local pilgrimage site. In December 2020, the idol of Rama in the temple was vandalised, leading to protests and increased security arrangements at the site.

== Gallery ==
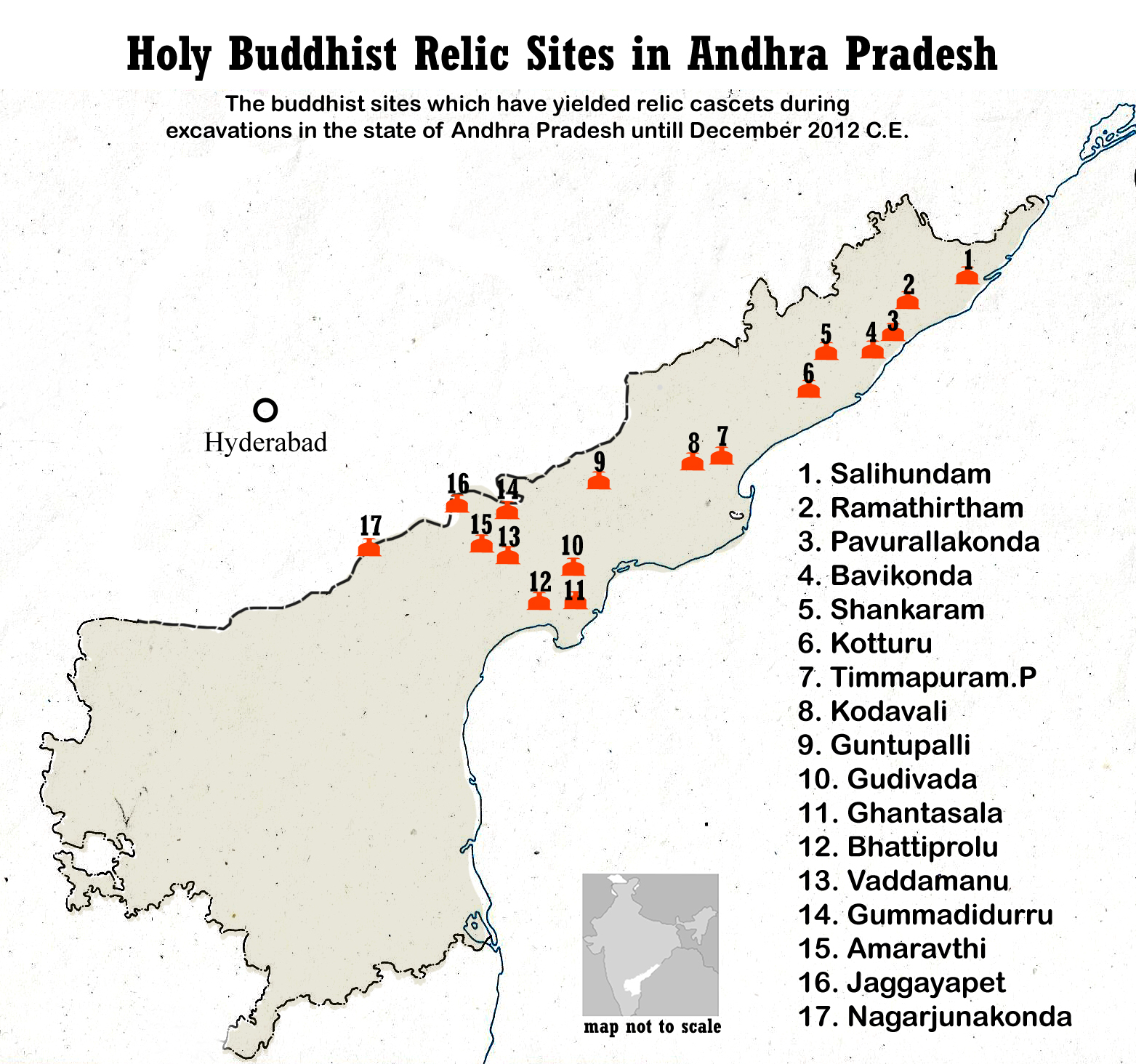
Holy relic sites map of Andhra Pradesh

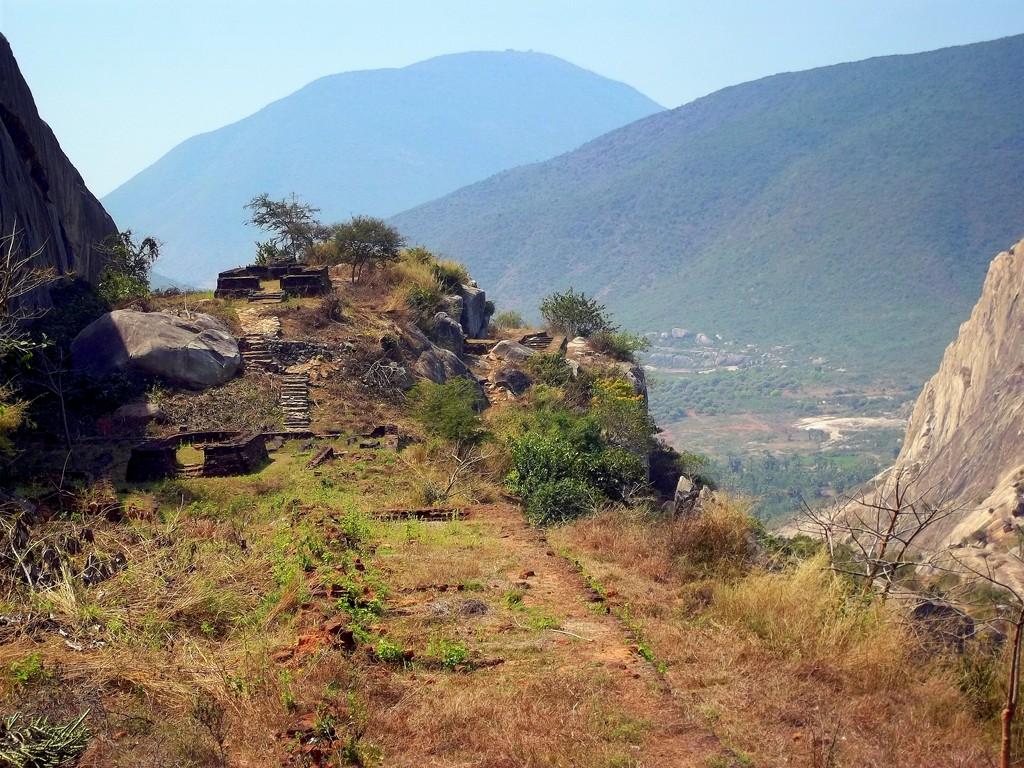
Gurubhaktalukonda Monastery ruins

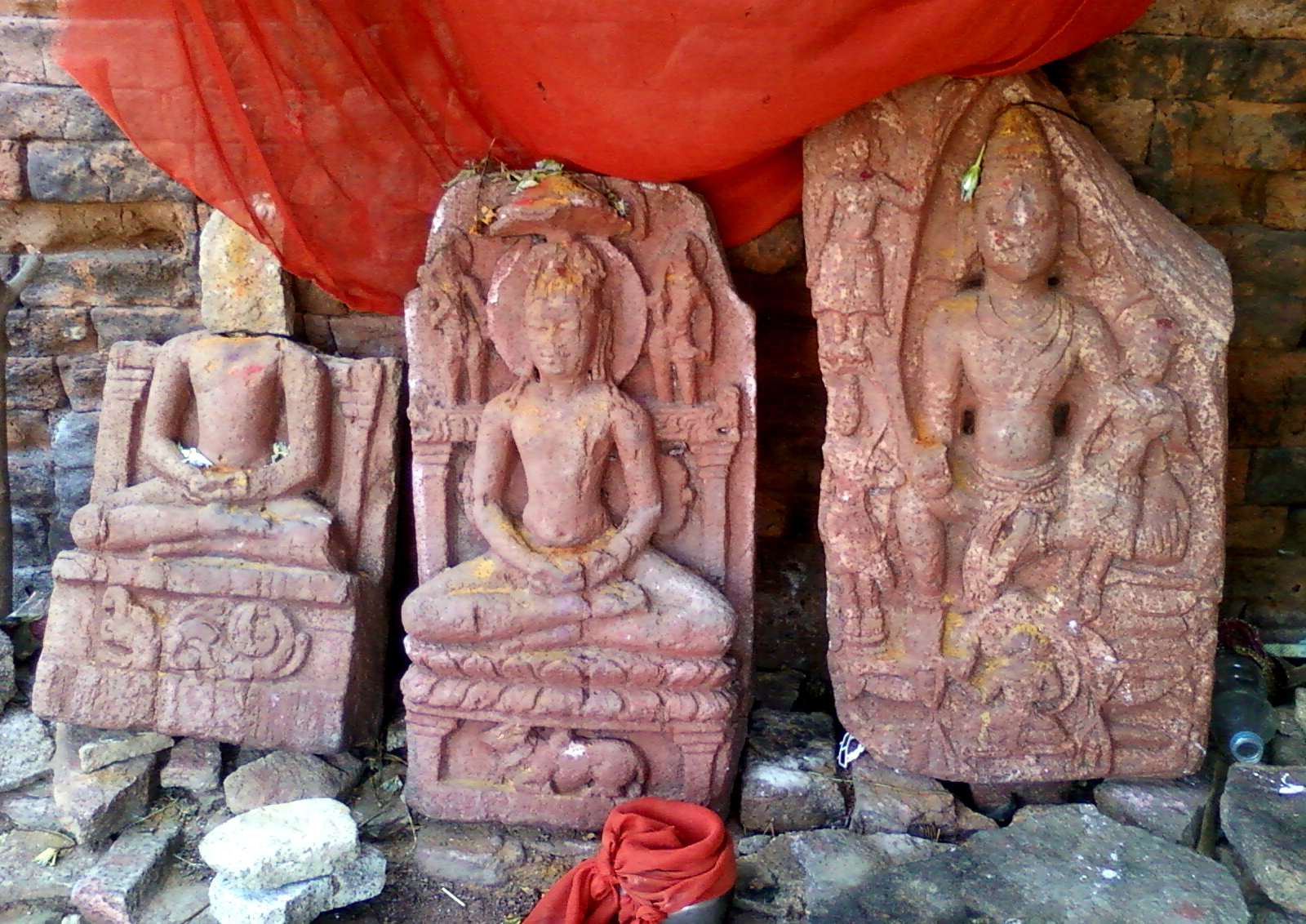
Jain reliefs on Bodhikonda

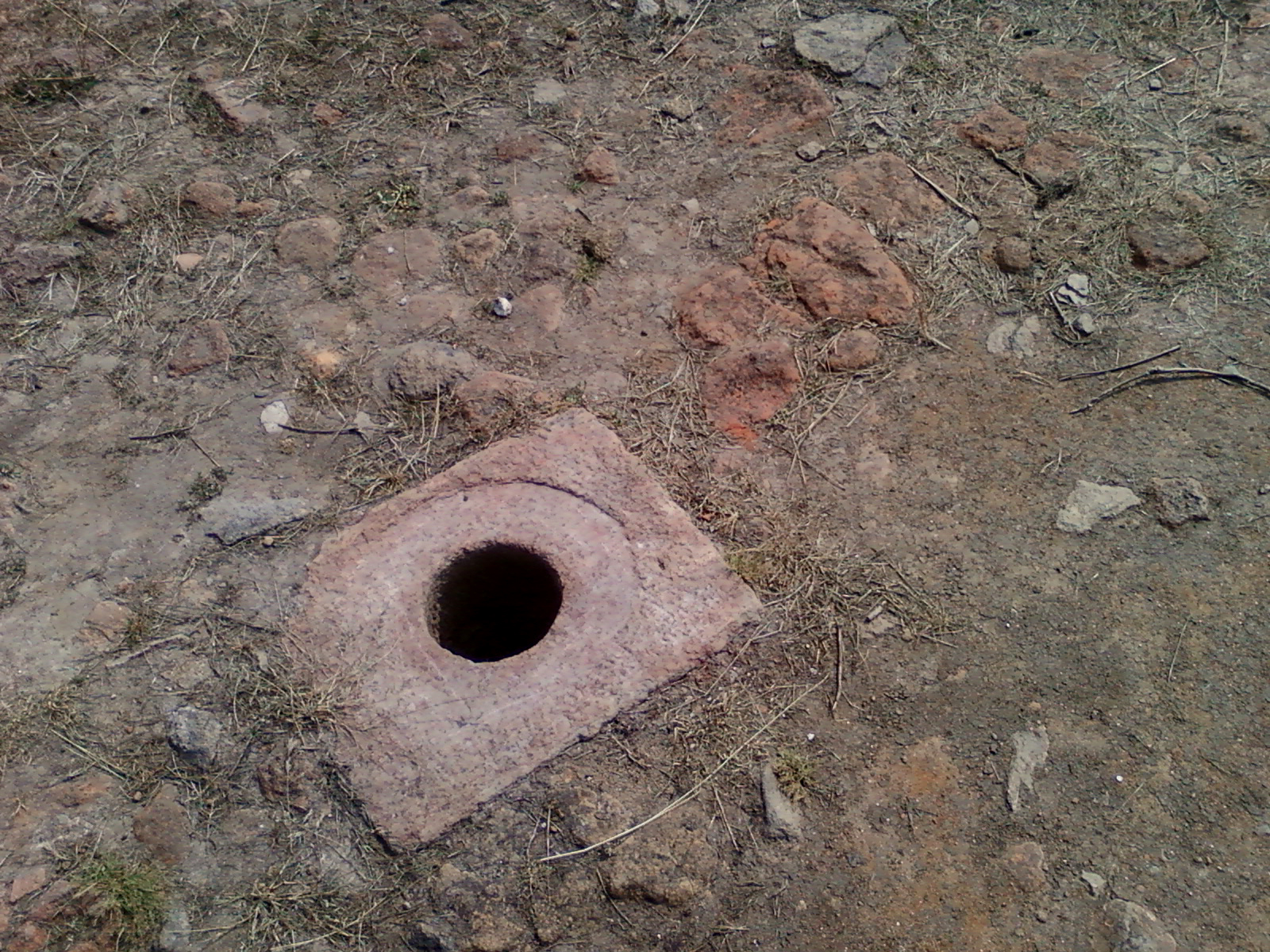
Remnants on Bodhikonda

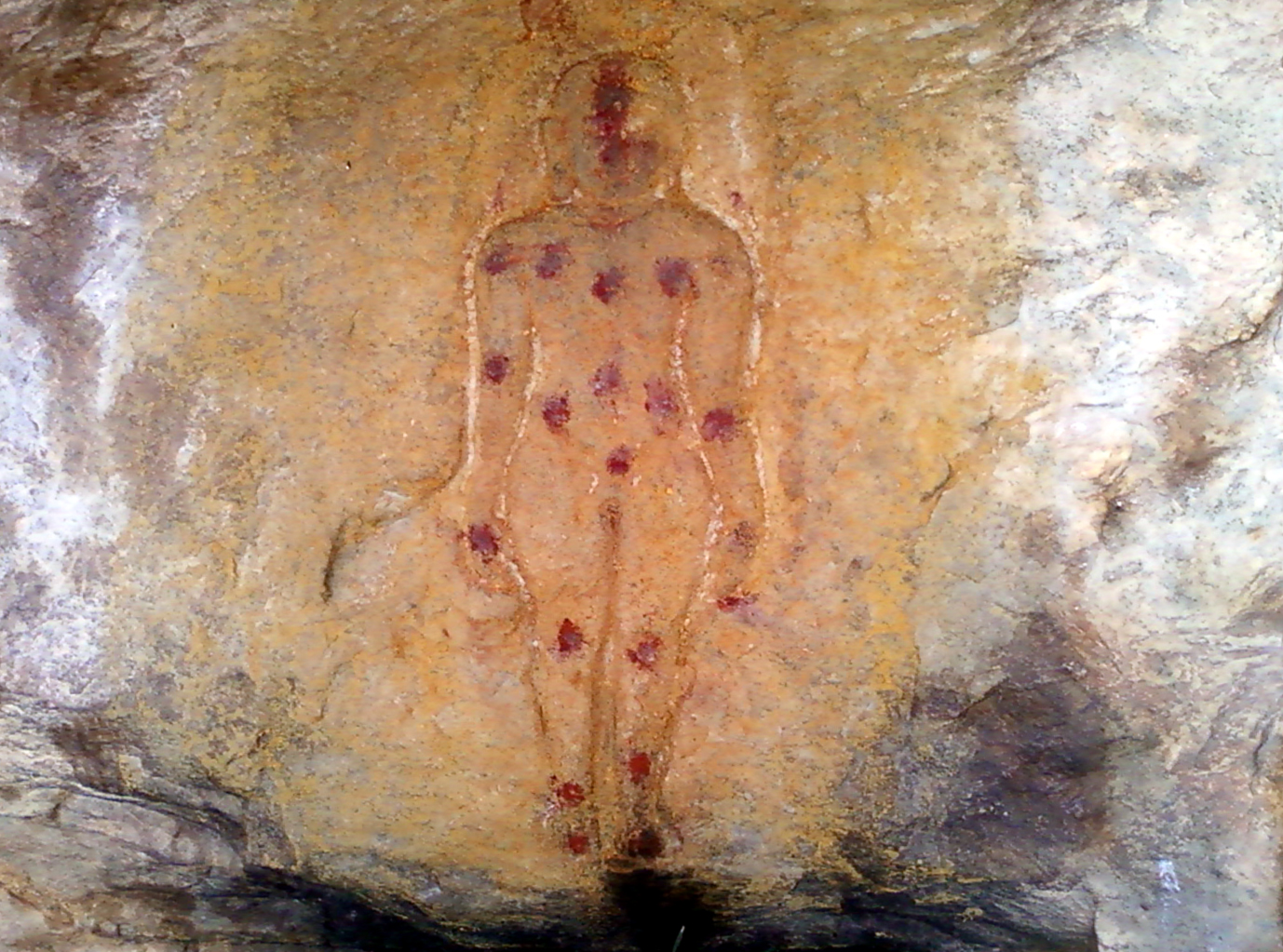
Jain Tirthankara Image at Rockcut Caves of Ghanikonda

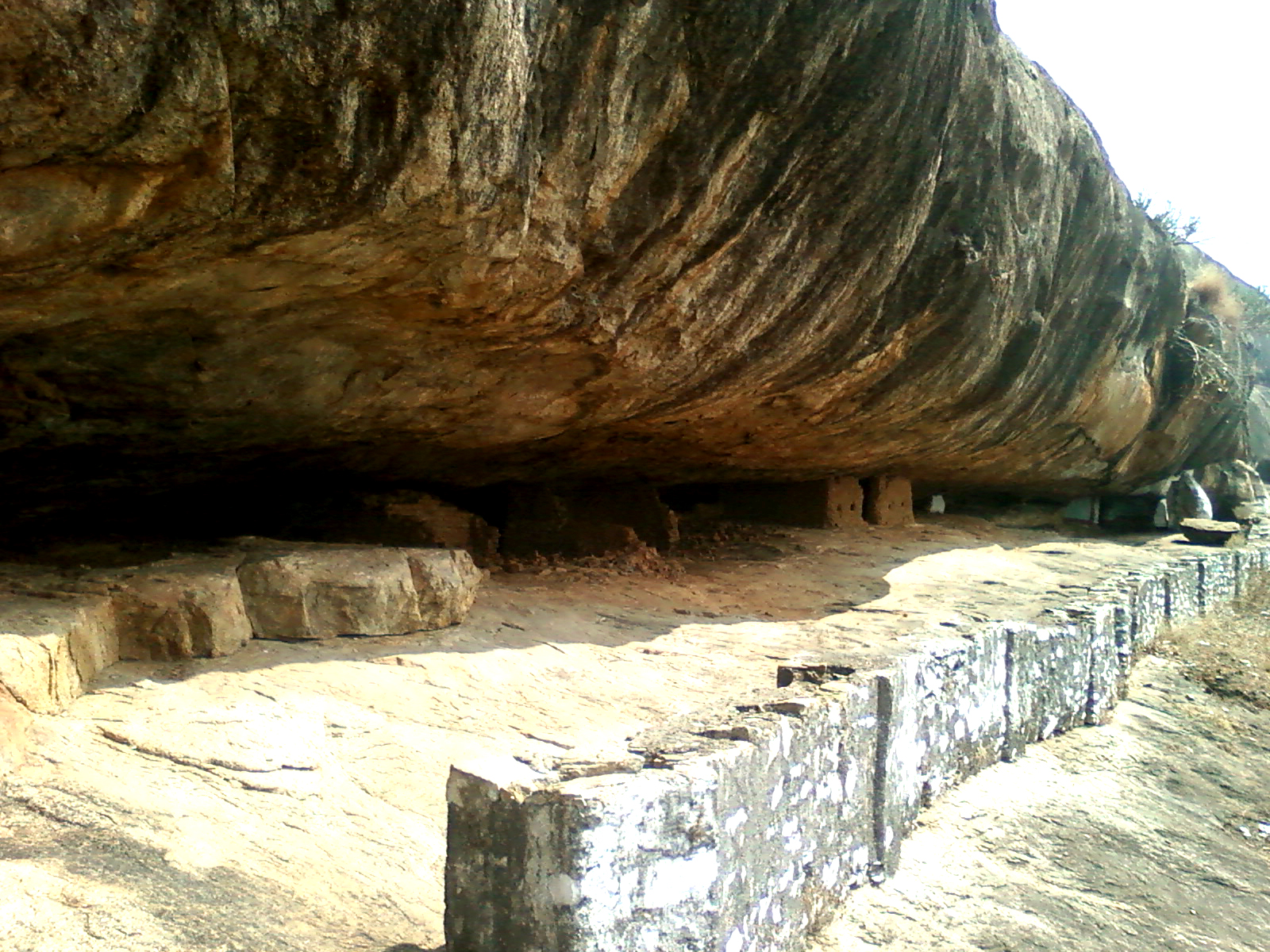
Jain caves at BodhiKonda in Ramatheertham

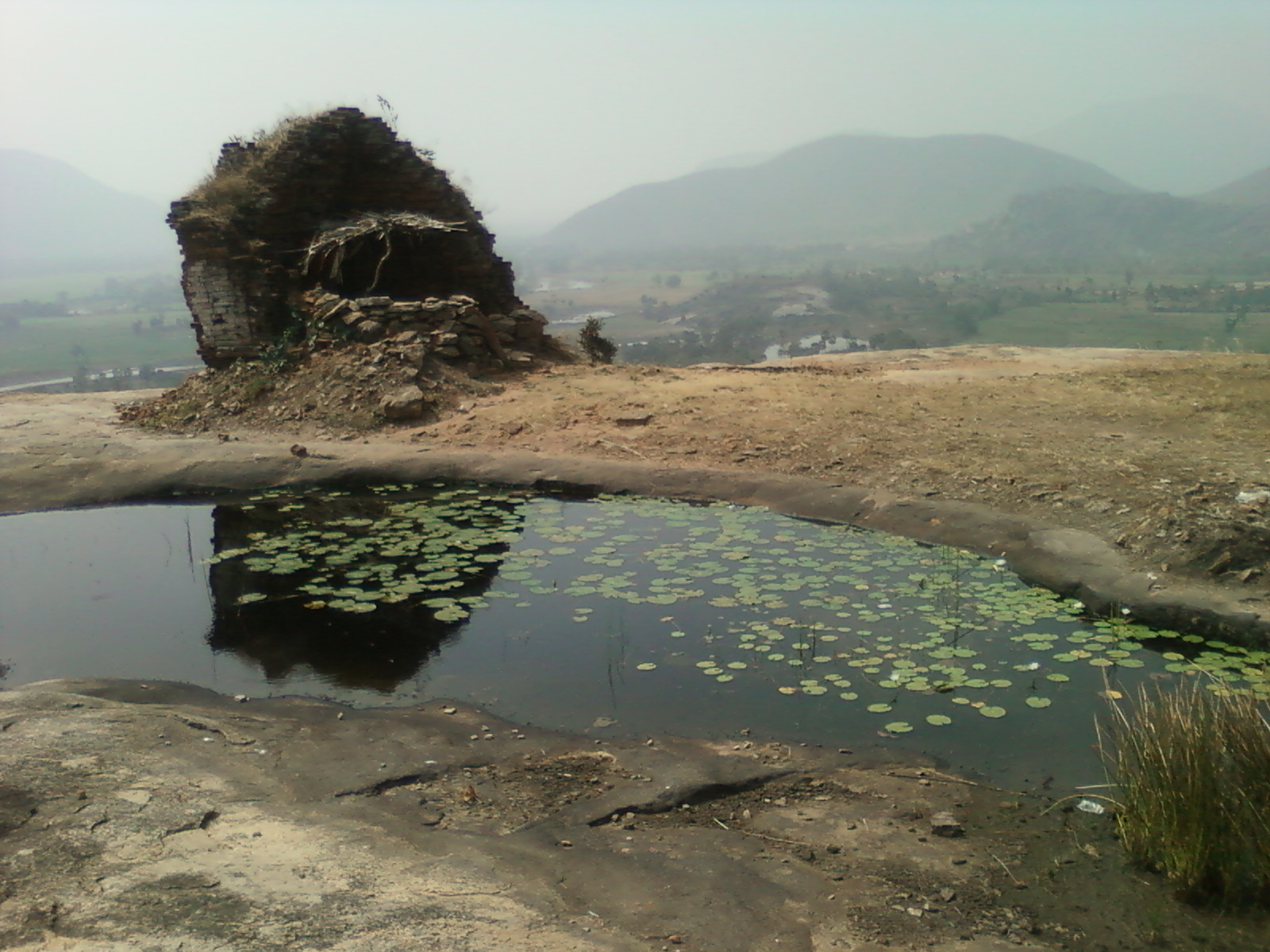
Ruined temple on Bodhikonda

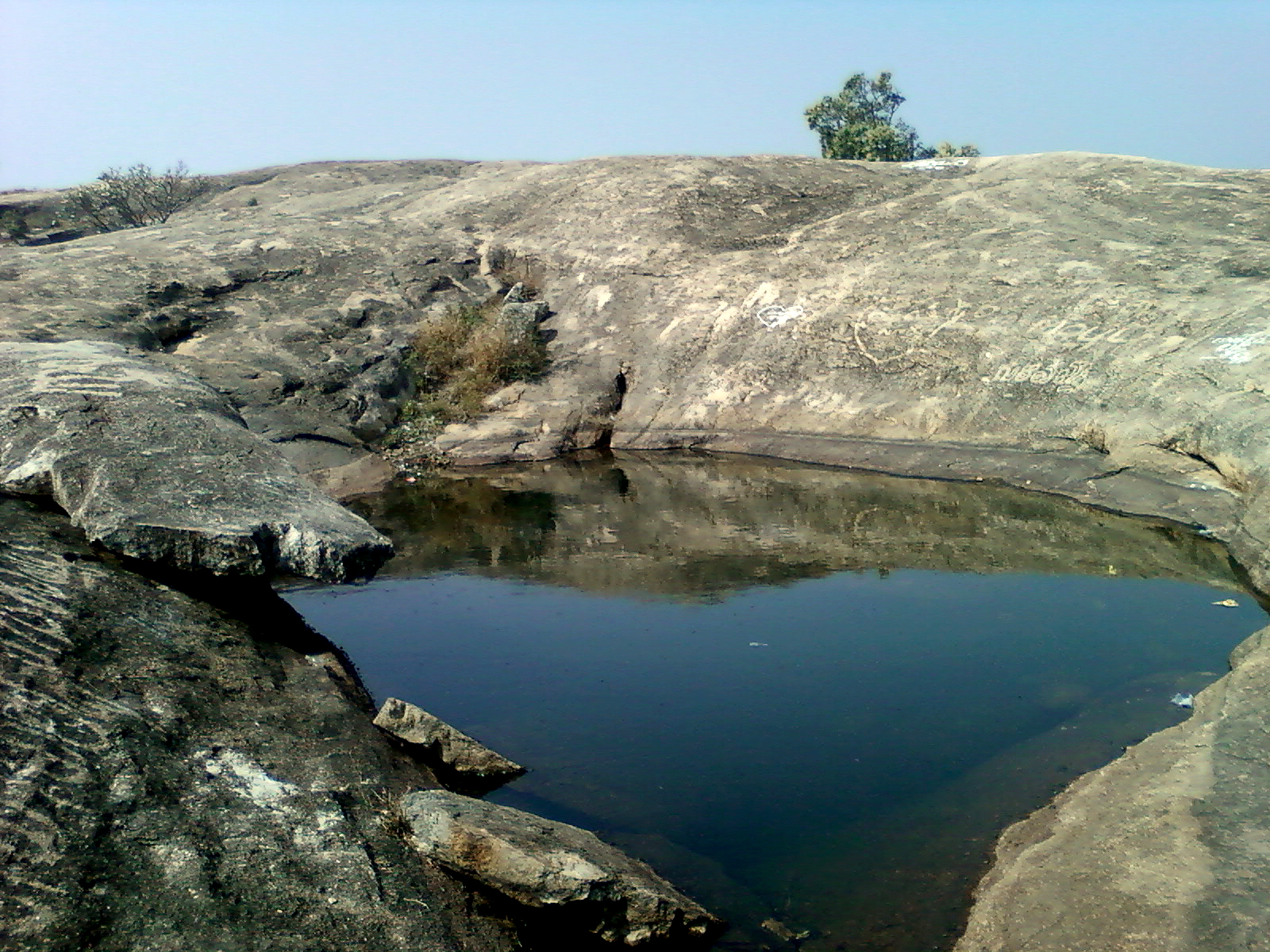
Deep Cistern on hilltop of Bodhikonda

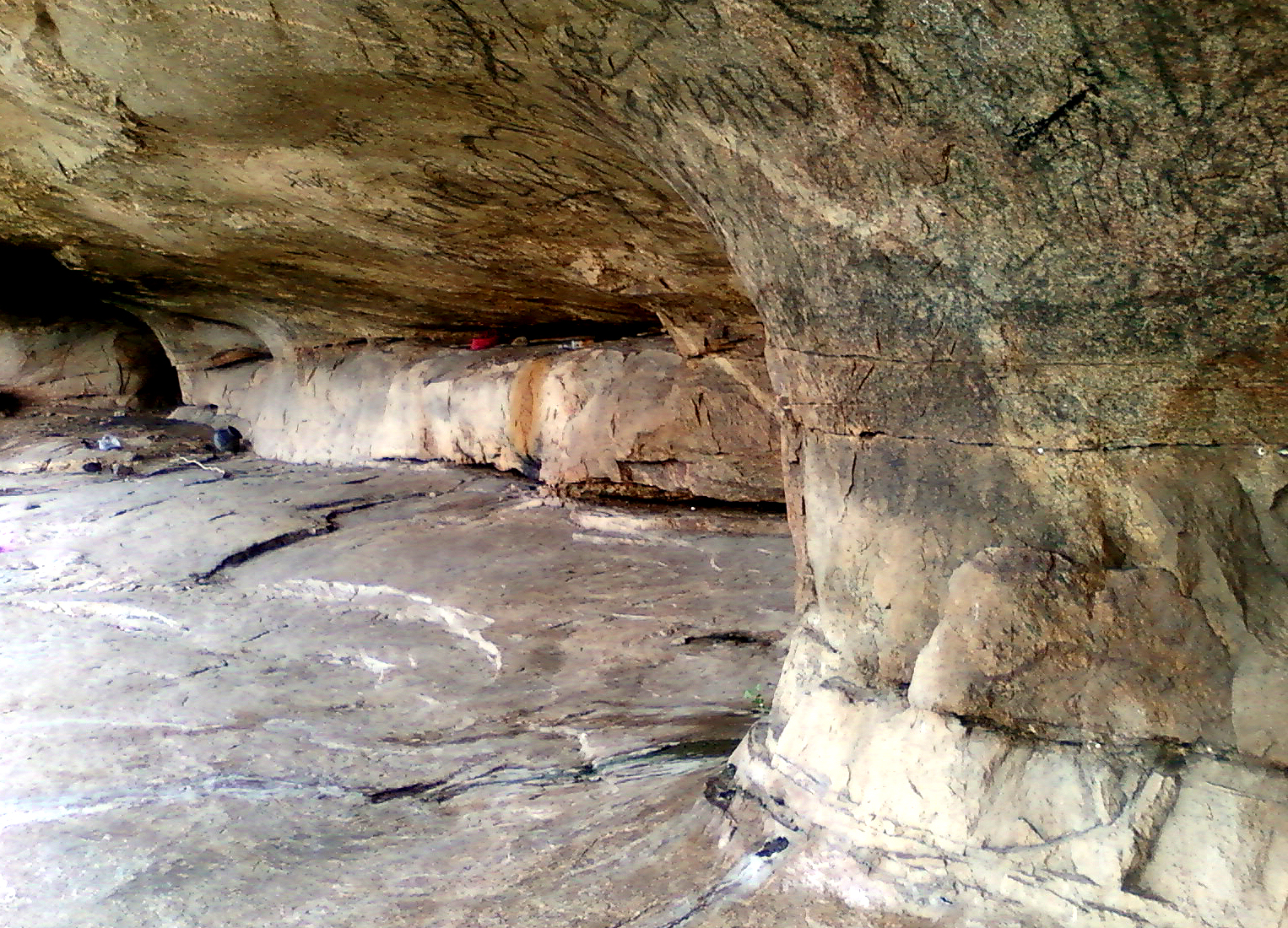
Jain Caves at Ghanikonda

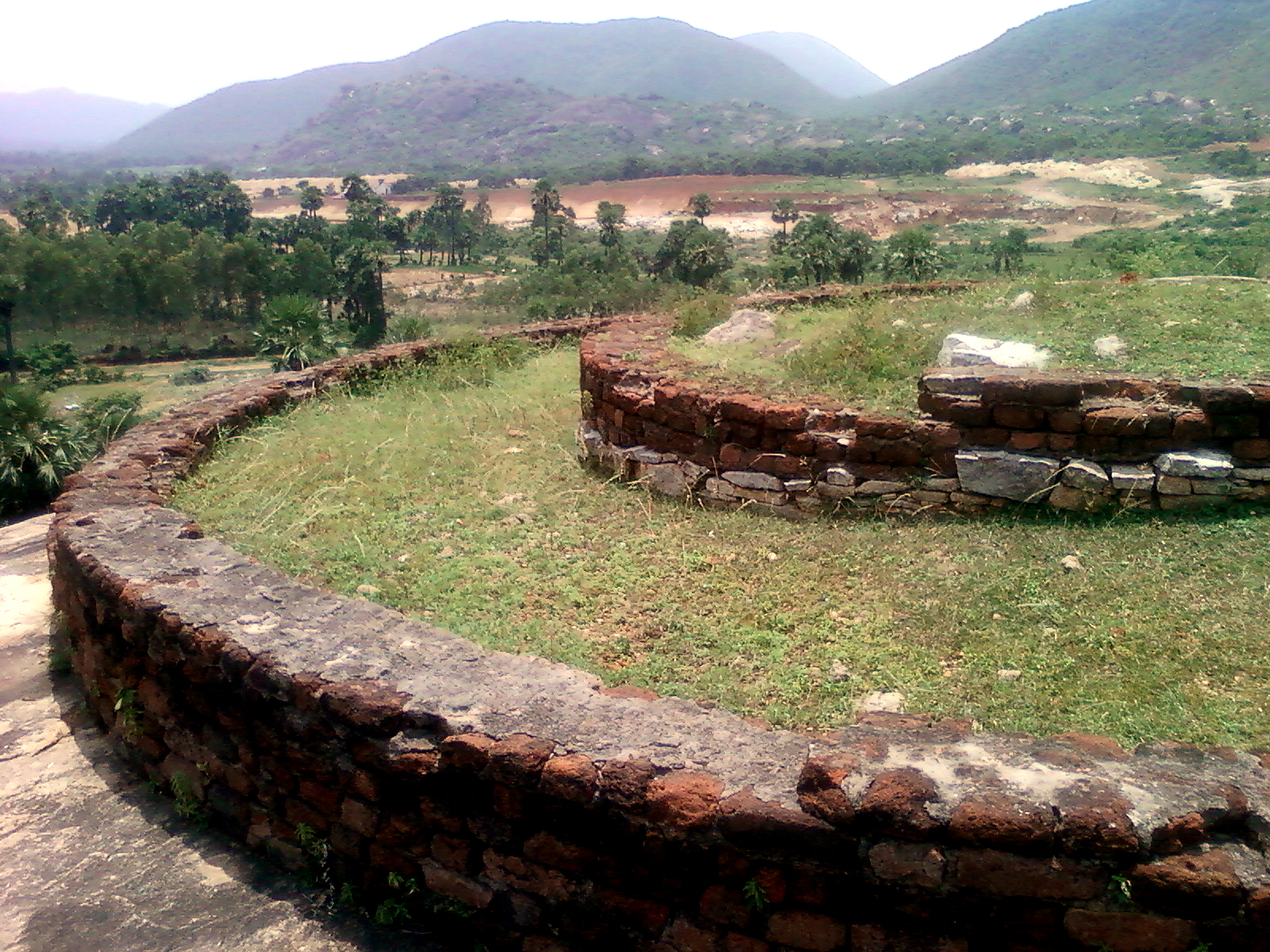
Circular stupa at Ghanikonda

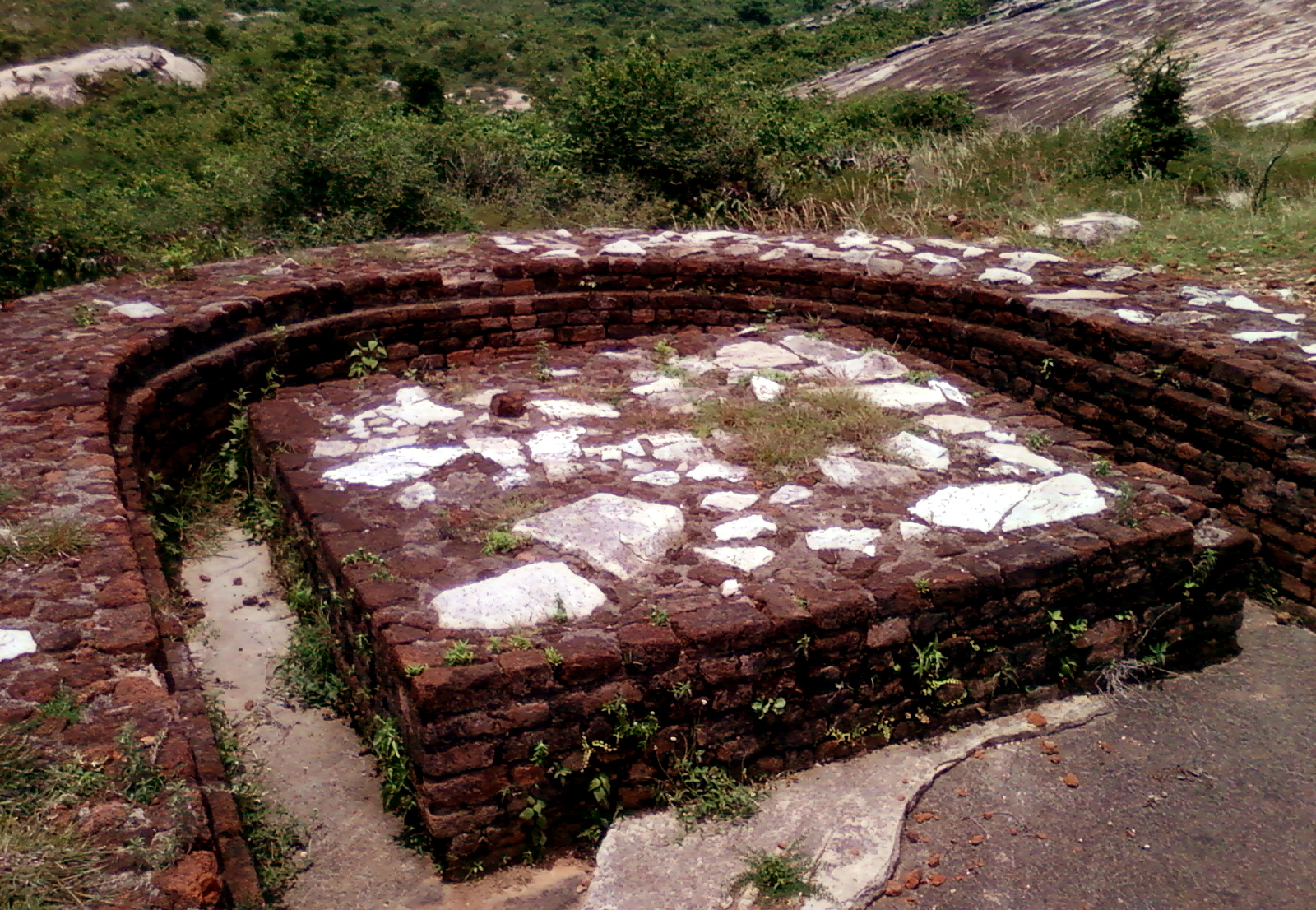
Remnants of a stupa on Ghanikonda

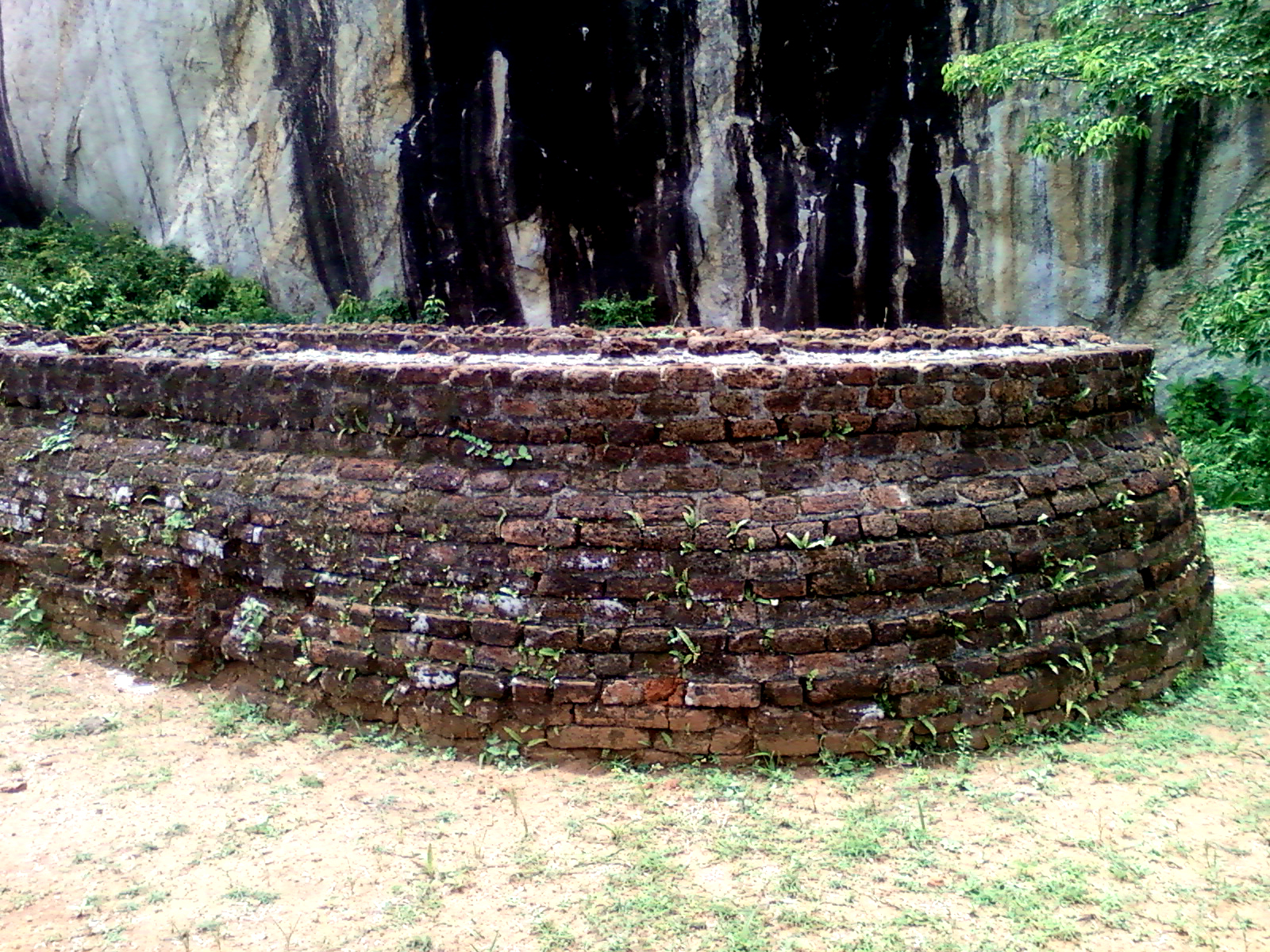
Apsidal stupa walls at Gurubhaktulakonda monastery

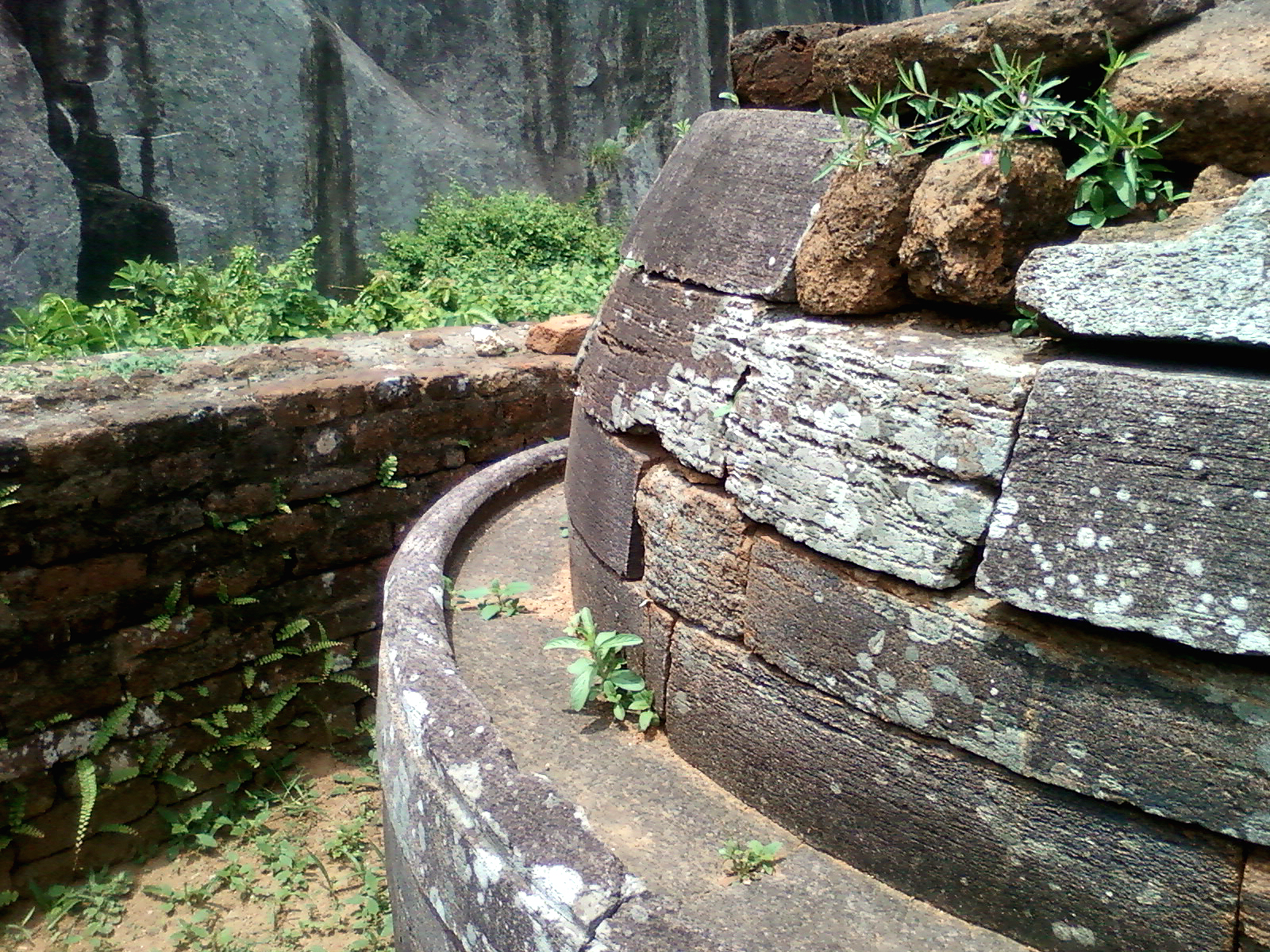
Ruined stone stupa at Gurubhaktulakonda monastery

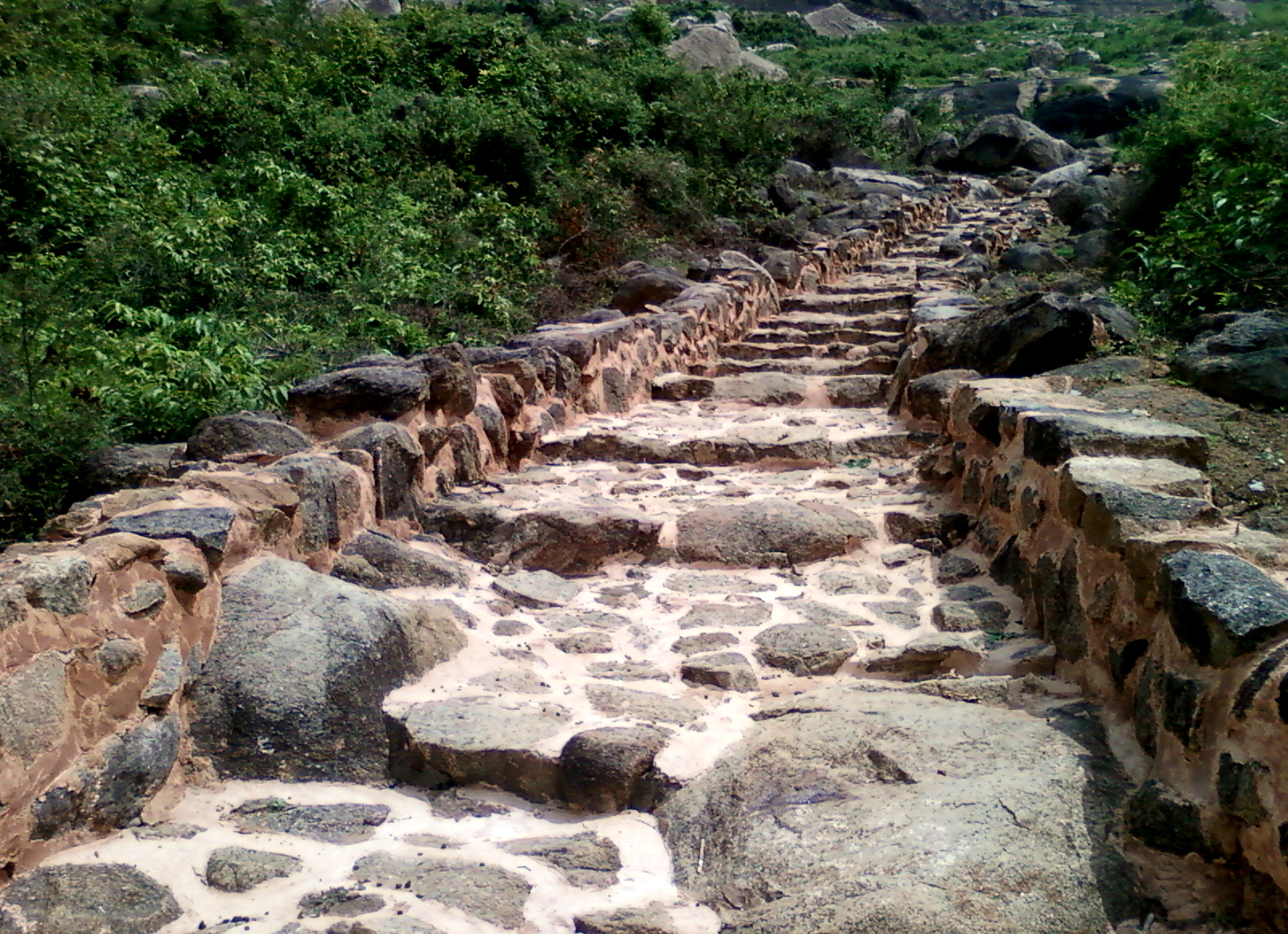
Steps leading to Gurubhaktulakonda Monastery

== See also ==
- Danavulapadu Jain temple
