= Jayasimha I (Eastern Chalukya dynasty) =

Eastern Chalukya Emperor from 641 to 673

Eastern Chalukya Emperor
- Reign: 641–673
- Predecessor: Kubja Vishnuvardhana
- Successor: Indra Bhattaraka
- Died: 673
- House: Chalukya

Jayasimha I (reigned 641–673) succeeded Kubja Vishnuvardhana as the king of Eastern Chalukyas. He had a long reign of 32 years however, nothing important is known to have happened in his reign.

His younger brother Indra Bhattaraka succeeded him.
