= Danavulapadu Jain temple =

Jain temple in the state of Andhra Pradesh

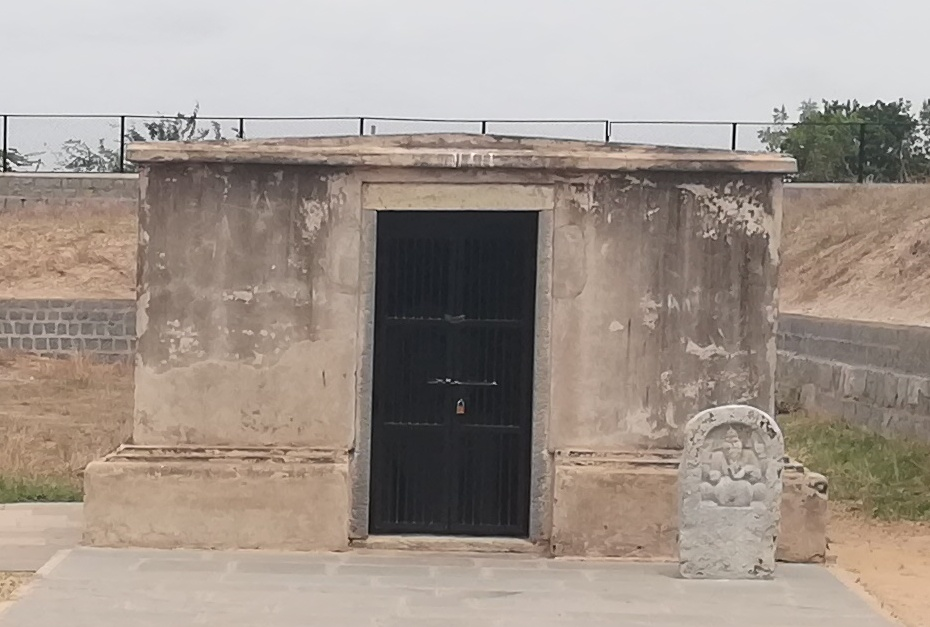
- Danavulapadu Jain temple

- Location within Andhra Pradesh

Religion
- Affiliation: Jainism
- Sect: Digambara
- Deity: Parshvanatha
- Festival: Mahavir Jayanti

Location
- Location: Danavulapadu village, Kadapa, Andhra Pradesh
- Interactive map of Danavulapadu Jain temple
- Coordinates: 14°47′29.3″N 78°26′16.6″E

Architecture
- Style: Rashtrakuta architecture
- Established: 8th century

Danavulapadu Jain temple is an ancient Jain center located in Danavulapadu village, within the Jammalamadugu mandal of Kadapa district in the state of Andhra Pradesh.

== History ==
Danavulapadu Jain temple, discovered in 1903, was once an important Jain center and received royal patronage from Rashtrakuta dynasty. According to inscriptions on Nishidhi stone, the site was popular among Jain acharyas to perform Sallekhana. A 13th-century inscription found in a neighbouring village mentions the presence of this temple.

A chaumukha (four-faced) idol was installed in 8th century during reign of Rashtrakuta dynasty. (Note: Chaumukh idol faces all four cardinal directions.) There is a one-line sanskrit inscription at the base of the statue with characters from the early Eastern Chalukyas period. In 968 CE, Khottiga, Rashtrakuta empire, installed a panavatta for the Mahamastakabhisheka of Shantinatha.

== About temple ==
The temple plan features a mandapa, antarala, and garbhagriha. The adhishthana of the temple is decorated with fine carvings. There are carvings of Nāga, Nāginī, Hanuman and Ganesha on temple wall.

The temple enshrines a 10th-century 12 feet (3.7 m) idol of a five-hooded serpent Parshvanatha seated on a lotus shaped pedestal with carvings scroll ornaments and sculptures of elephants and crocodiles as vahanas. The hands and portion below the knee are broken. There is an image of yakshi in lotus position seated on a lion. The second shrine is heavily ornate structure ensuring an idol of Tirthankara. Several serpent deities idols have been placed besides the well near the temple complex. The temple also houses an idol of Padmavati.

== Gallery ==
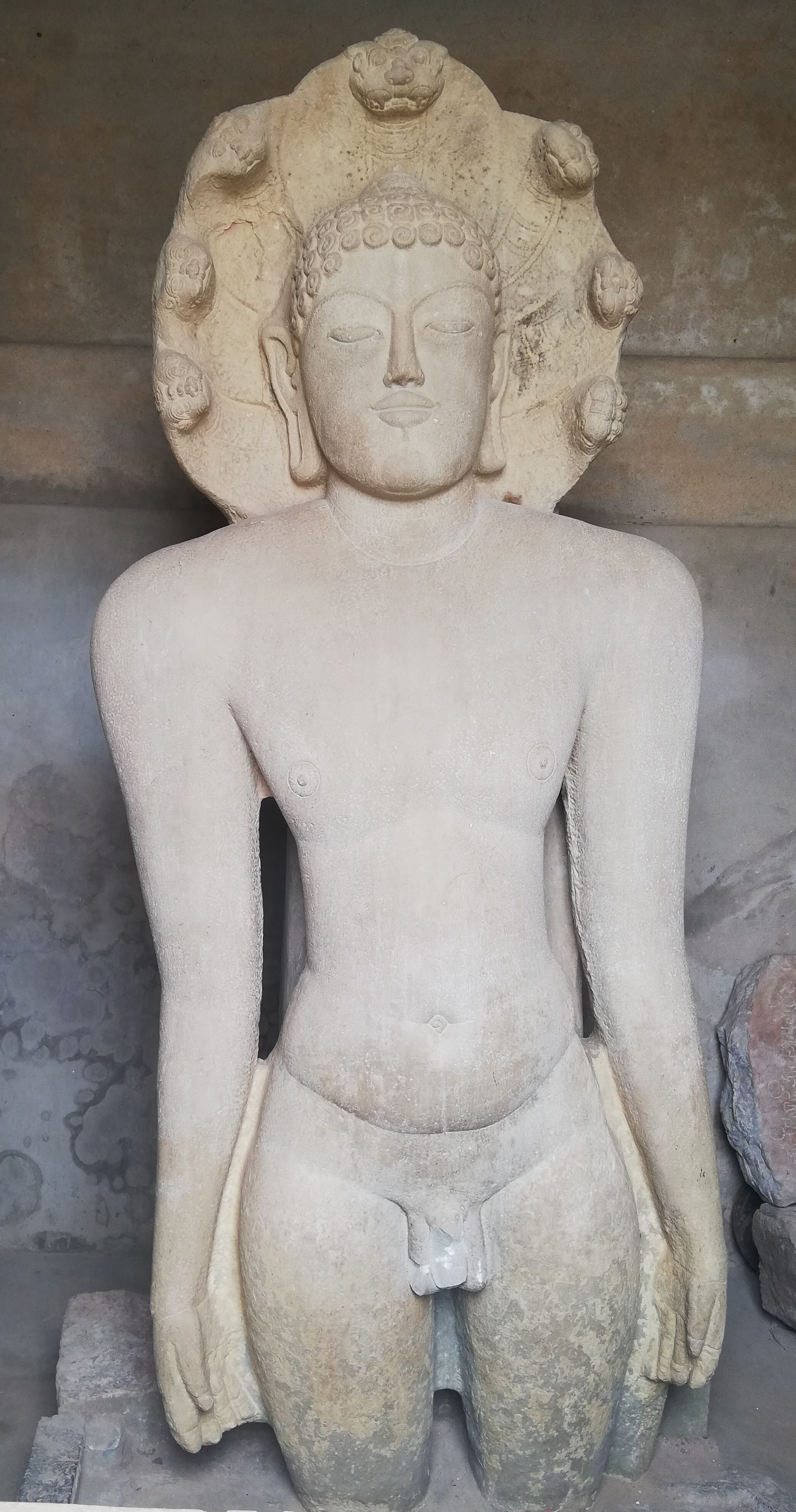
Parshvanatha idol

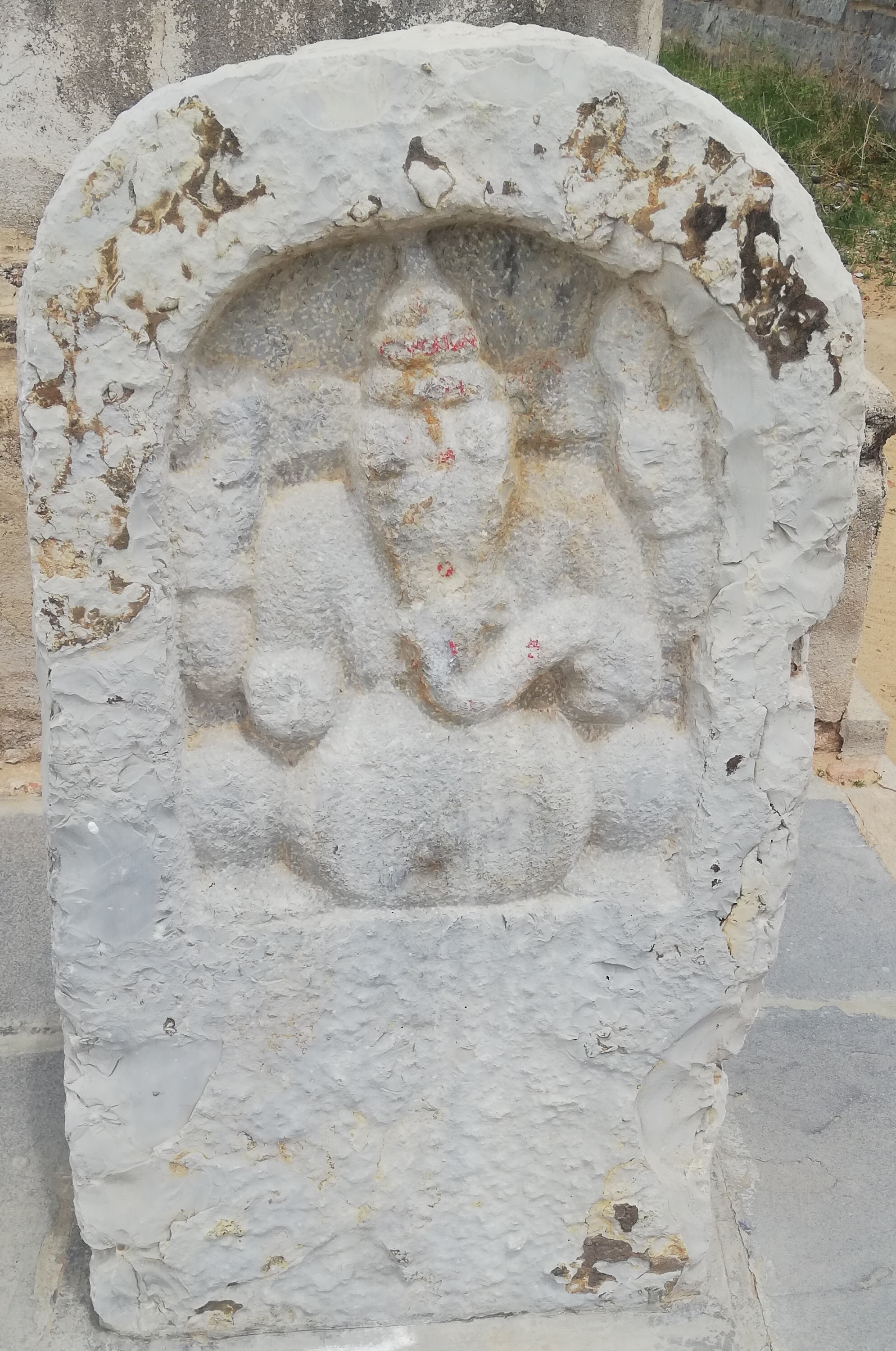
Image of Ganesha

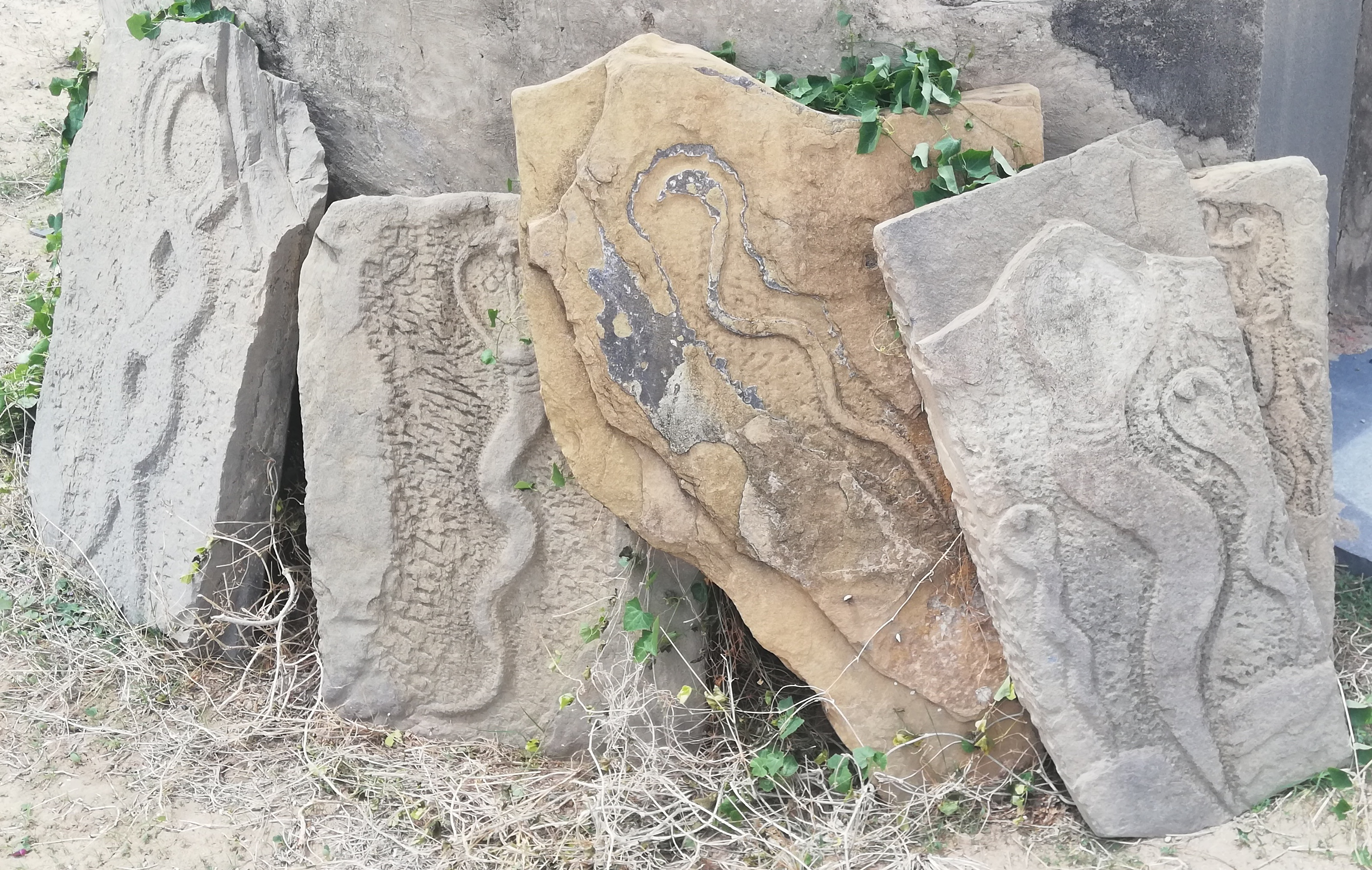
Idols of serpent near the temple

== Conservation ==
The temple complex is protected by Archaeological Survey of India. Various artefacts, inscriptions and sculptures discovered at the site are now placed inside Government Museum, Chennai.

== See also ==
- Ramateertham
- Ambapuram cave temple
