= Indra Bhattaraka =

Eastern Chalukya Emperor in 673

Eastern Chalukya Emperor
- Reign: 673
- Predecessor: Jayasimha I
- Successor: Vishnuvardhana II
- Died: 673
- Issue: Vishnuvardhana II
- House: Chalukya

Indra Bhattaraka (reigned 673) succeeded his brother Jayasimha I as the king of Eastern Chalukyas. He had a very short reign of a week.His son Vishnuvardhana II succeeded him.

Preceded by Jayasimha I	Eastern Chalukyas; 673	Succeeded by Vishnuvardhana II
