= Cultural Centre of Vijayawada =

- Formation: May 2014
- Type: Non-governmental organization
- Legal status: Cultural Centre
- Purpose: Promote cultural activities
- Headquarters: Vijayawada
- Location: Mahalaxmi Chambers, Moghalrajpuram, Vijayawada, Andhra Pradesh, India
- Region served: Vijayawada
- Official language: Telugu
- CEO: E.Sivanagi Reddy
- Main organ: Malaxmi Group

Cultural Centre of Vijayawada is an organization for promoting art and culture of Vijayawada. It was formed in May 2014 and located at Moghalrajpuram area of Vijayawada. The cultural centre hosts several cultural events related to art, classical dance, music, painting and expos etc.

== Awards and achievements ==
The Cultural Centre of Vijayawada entered in the Wonder Book of Records International for organizing a multi lingual poets event called Poetic Prism.

== Administration ==
The CEO of the organization is E.Sivanagi Reddy.
