= Vishnuvardhana II =

Eastern Chalukya Emperor from 673 to 682

Eastern Chalukya Emperor
- Reign: 673–682
- Predecessor: Indra Bhattaraka
- Successor: Mangi Yuvaraja
- Died: 682
- House: Chalukya
- Father: Indra Bhattaraka

Vishnuvardhana II (reigned 673–682) became the Eastern Chalukya king following the very short rule of his father Indra Bhattaraka.

His son Mangi Yuvaraja succeeded him.

Preceded by Indra Bhattaraka	Eastern Chalukyas; 673–682	Succeeded by Mangi Yuvaraja
