= Chaumukha =

- Village
- Location in Odisha, India Chaumukha (India)
- Coordinates: 21.566389°N 87.3233°E
- Country: India
- State: Odisha
- District: Baleswar
- Elevation: 23 m (75 ft)

Languages
  - Official: Odia
- Time zone: UTC+5:30 (IST)
- PIN: 756083
- Vehicle registration: OD 01
- Website: odisha.gov.in

Chaumukha is a coastal village in Baliapal block of Baleswar district of the Indian state of Odisha.

Chaumukha and Dagara are the two coastal villages in Baliapal Block broadly used to mention about the closer seaside and beach. The beach also has the presence of other beaches like Chandipur and Talasari of Baleswar district with red crabs, silvery sand, casuarina forest.

Chaumukh village is located in India and listed under Taluk : Baliapal, in the district of Baleshwar, Odisha State.

Chaumukh Chaumukh is a village in Baliapal Tehsil in Baleshwar District of Odisha State, India

It is located 52 km towards East from District headquarters Balasore

13 km from Bahiapal

246 km from State capital Bhubaneswar Chaumukh Pin code is 756083 and postal head office is Pratappur (Baleswar)

Jamkunda (7 km), Betagadia (8 km), Aladiha (9 km), Pratappur (9 km), Kanthibhaunri (9 km) are the nearby Villages to Chaumukh

Chaumukh is surrounded by Baliapal Tehsil towards North, Basta Tehsil towards North, Ramnagar-I Tehsil towards East, Ramnagar-Ii Tehsil towards East

Jaleswar, Balasore, Baleshwar, Contai are the nearby Cities to Chaumukh

It is near to bay of Bengal

There is a chance of humidity in the weather

Demographics of Chaumukh Oriya is the Local Language here.

Chaumukh Location

Tehsil Name : Baliapal District : Baleshwar State : Odisha Language : Oriya and Hindi Time zone: IST (UTC+5:30) Elevation / Altitude: 13 meters. Above Sea level Telephone Code / Std Code: 06781 Pin Code : 756083 Post Office Name : Pratappur (Baleswar) Alternate Village Name : Choumukh

How to Reach Chaumukh

Chaumukh

By Train

There is no railway station near to Chaumukh in less than 10 km. However Kharagpur Jn Railway Station is major railway station 97 km near to Chaumukh

Nearby Railway Stations

Digha Flag Stn- 22 km Ramnagar Bengal- 30 km Rajghat Halt- 32 km Jaleswar- 32 km

Places near Chaumukh

Digha- 23 km Chandipur- 38 km Baripada- 82 km Midnapore- 107 km Medinipur- 107 km

Chaumukh Nearby Places

Few nearby places of Chaumukh are listed below for your reference:

Cities

Jaleswar- 31 km Balasore- 46 km Baleshwar- 50 km Contai- 55 km

Taluks

Bhograi- 14 km Baliapal- 16 km Basta- 25 km Ramnagar-I- 28 km

Airports

Netaji Subhas Chandra Bose Airport- 186 km Bhubaneswar Airport- 239 km Ranchi Airport- 318 km

== Geography ==
Chaumukha is located at 21°33′59″N 87°19′24″E.

== Transport ==
The nearest bus stop to reach Dagara is Jagai (9 km). Chaumukha is 64 km from Baleswar. The nearest rail head is Jaleswar (58 km). Another railway station Basta is 65 km from here. Nearest airport is Bhubaneswar.
