= Vishnuvardhana (Varika king) =

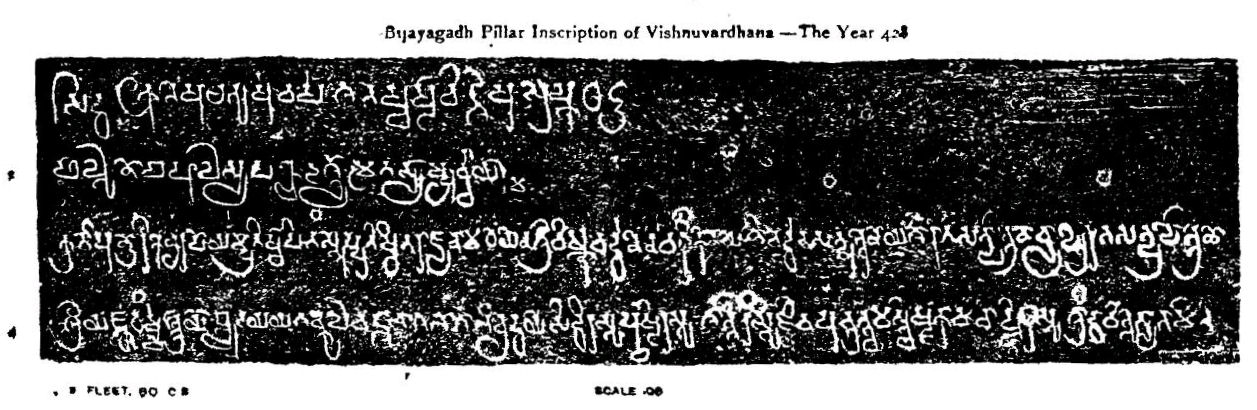
Bijayagadh pillar inscription of Vishnuvardhana.

Vishnuvardhana was a king of the Varika tribe in Malwa, and probably a feudatory of Gupta Emperor Samudragupta. His existence is attested to by the Bijayagadh inscription, which is inscribed on a sacrificial pillar. Dated to the year 428 of an unspecified era, epigraphic evidence suggests that this corresponds to the Vikram Samvat calendar, placing the date at approximately 371-372 CE.

The Bijayagadh Stone Pillar Inscription of Vishnuvardhana, locally known as Bhīm kī Lāţ, was erected at Bayana in Bharatpur district for having perfection been attained in samvat 428 on the fifteenth lunar day of the dark fortnight of (the month) Phâlguna. The Bijayagadh Stone Pillar Inscription of Vishnuvardhana reads as:

Perfection has been attained! Four centuries of years, together with the twenty-eighth (year), (or in figures) 400 (ana) 20 (ana) 8, having been accomplished; on the fifteenth lunar day of the dark fortnight of (the month) Phâlguna;-on this (lunar day), (specified) as aforesaid: -

"(Line 3.)-On the ceremony of the pundarîka-sacrifice (having been performed), this sacrificial post has been caused to be set up by the Varika, the illustrious Vishnuvarhana whose royalty and name are well established,-who is the excellent son of Yashôvardhana; (and) the excellent son’s son of Yashôrâta; (and) the excellent son of the son’s son of Vyâghrarâta, - for the purpose of increasing (his) splendour, sacrifices, religion, welfare (in the other world), prosperity, fame, family, lineage, good fortune, and enjoyment.

(L. 4.)-Let there be success! Let there be increase! Let there be tranquillity! Let there be the condition of (his) having a son who shall live! Let there be the attainment of desires that are wished for! May there be faith and wealth!

— Bijayagadh Stone Pillar Inscription of Vishnuvardhana.
