= Kubja Vishnuvardhana =

Eastern Chalukya Emperor from 624 to 641

- Vishama-Siddhi

Eastern Chalukya Emperor
- Reign: 624–641
- Predecessor: Position established
- Successor: Jayasimha I
Other governmental responsibilities
Viceroy of Vengi
Reign	615–624
Emperor	Pulakeshin II

Kubja Vishnuvardhana I (reigned 624–641), also known as Bittarasa in Kannada, was the younger brother of Chalukya Pulakeshin II. Vishnuvardhana I ruled the Vengi territories in eastern Andhra Pradesh as the viceroy under Pulakeshin II from around 615. Eventually, Vishnuvardhana declared his independence and started the Eastern Chalukya dynasty in 624.

The Eastern Chalukyas ruled the Vengi kingdom for nearly five centuries and had a very close relationship with the imperial Cholas.

== Origin of Eastern Chalukyas ==
Pulakeshin II (608–644), the greatest Vatapi Chalukya king, conquered the eastern Deccan, corresponding the coastal districts of Andhra Pradesh 616, defeating the remnants of the Vishnukundina kingdom. He appointed his brother Kubja Vishnuvardhana as Viceroy. On the death of Pulakeshin II, the Vengi viceroyalty developed into an independent kingdom. The Eastern Chalukyas of Vengi outlived the main Vatapi dynasty by many generations.

== Possible reason for the partition ==
Scholars are not in agreement as to why Vishnuvardhana declared himself king of the eastern Deccan territories of Pulakeshin II.

Partition of Vengi as a separate kingdom

It has been tacitly assumed that this was a formal division and Pulakeshin II conferred independent sovereignty of Vengi on his younger brother. It was stated in the Kopparam plates that Kubja Vishnuvardhana was ruling only as a subordinate to his brother Pulakeshin II in the Vengi area. A revolution of Kubja Vishnuvardhana can be ruled out of account since the records indicate a good relationship between the brothers.

Das Kornel posits that Pulakeshin II sent his younger brother Kubja Vishnuvardhana as viceroy to the Vengi region. There, the latter was able to subdue the Vishnukundina King (possibly Janasraya Madhava Varman) and carve out a kingdom for himself.

One possible reason is the turn of events around middle of the 7th century in the Badami Chalukyan kingdom. The last few ruling years of Pulakeshin II ended in disaster. The great Pallava king Narasimhavarman I, inflicted a crushing defeat on the Chalukyas and burnt Badami. Pulakeshin II lost his life in this encounter. The five sons of Pulakeshin fought among themselves in the period that followed, and tried to divide the kingdom into independent states. Pulakeshin's third son Vikramaditya I became the Chalukya king c. 642 and eventually restored order after defeating his brothers.

== Vishnuvardhana's reign ==
Vishnuvardhana ruled over a kingdom extending from Nellore to Visakhapatnam. He assumed the title of Vishamasiddhi (conqueror of difficulties). Vishnuvardhana participated in the wars between his brother Pulakeshin II and the Pallava Narasimhavarma I and probably lost his life in a battle in 641.

His son Jayasimha I succeeded him.

Preceded by Vishnukundina Dynasty	Eastern Chalukyas; 624–641	Succeeded by Jayasimha I
