= Eastern Chalukyas =

624–1189 dynasty in South India

Eastern Chalukyas Chalukyas of Vengi
- 624–1189
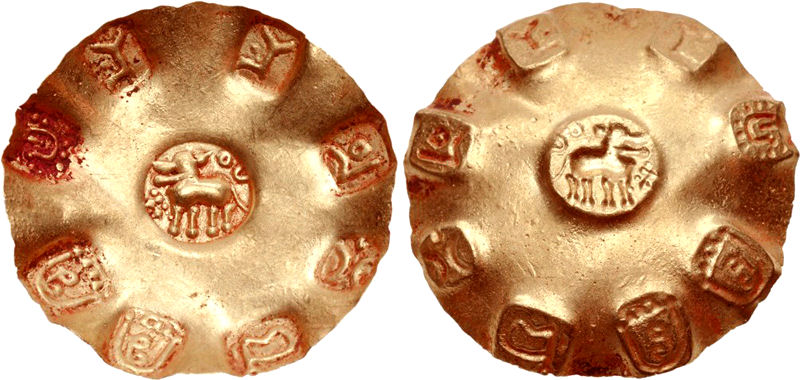
- Eastern Chalukya coin. Central punchmark depicting a Boar standing left. Incuse of punchmarks.

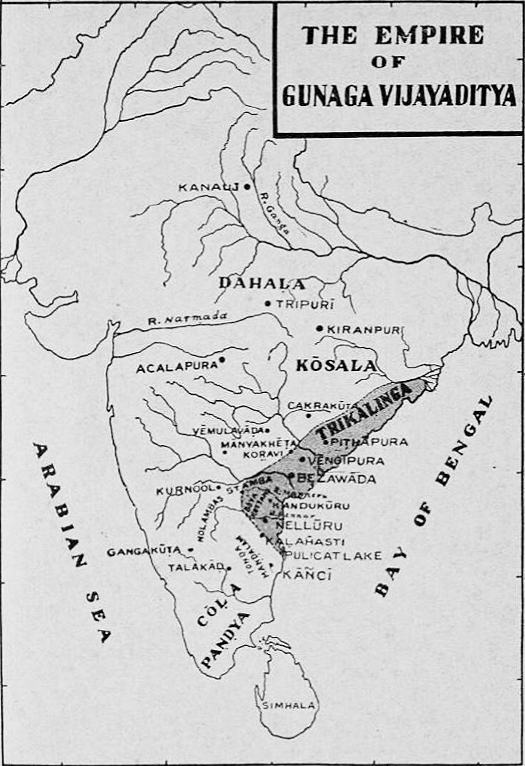
- Map of India c. 753 CE. The Eastern Chalukya kingdom is shown on the eastern coast.
- Capital: Pitapuram; Vengi; Rajamahendravaram
- Common languages: Telugu Sanskrit Kannada
- Religion: Shaivism Jainism
- Government: Monarchy
- Maharaja
  - 624–641: Kubja Vishnuvardhana
  - 1018–1061: Rajaraja Narendra
- History
  - Established: 624
  - Disestablished: 1189
Preceded by	Succeeded by
Chalukya dynasty	Chola Empire; Kakatiya dynasty

Eastern Chalukyas, also known as the Chalukyas of Vengi, were a dynasty that ruled parts of South India between the 7th and 12th centuries. They started out as governors of the Chalukyas of Badami in the Deccan region. Subsequently, they became a sovereign power, and ruled the Vengi region of present-day Andhra Pradesh until c. 1001 CE.

Originally, the capital of the Eastern Chalukyas was located at Pishtapura (modern-day Pitapuram). It was subsequently moved to Vengi (present-day Pedavegi, near Eluru) and then to Rajamahendravaram (now Rajahmundry). The five centuries of the Eastern Chalukya rule of Vengi saw not only the consolidation of this region into a unified whole, but also saw the efflorescence of Telugu culture, literature, poetry and art during the later half of their rule. They had marital relationship with Cholas.

== Origin ==
The Chalukyas of Vengi branched off from the Chalukyas of Badami. The Badami ruler Pulakeshin II (609–642 CE) conquered the Vengi region in eastern Deccan, after defeating the remnants of the Vishnukundina dynasty. He appointed his brother Kubja Vishnuvardhana the governor of this newly acquired territory in 624 A.D. Vishnuvardhana's viceroyalty subsequently developed into an independent kingdom, possibly after Pulakeshin died fighting the Pallavas in the Battle of Vatapi. Thus the Chalukyas were originally of Kannada stock.

As per the Timmapuram plates of Kubja Vishnuvardhana, the progenitor of the Eastern Chalukyas, they belonged to the Manavya Gotra and were Haritputras (sons of Hariti) just like the Kadambas and Western Chalukyas. From the 11th century onward, the dynasty started claiming legendary lunar dynasty origins. According to this legend, the dynasty descended from the Moon, via Budha, Pururava, the Pandavas, Satanika and Udayana. 59 unnamed descendants of Udayana ruled at Ayodhya. Their descendant Vijayaditya was killed in a battle with Trilochana Pallava, during an expedition in Dakshinapatha (Deccan). His pregnant widow was given shelter by Vishnubhatta Somayaji of Mudivemu (modern Jammalamadugu). She named her son Vishnuvardhana after her benefactor. When the boy grew up, he became the ruler of Dakshinapatha by the grace of the goddess Nanda Bhagavati.

== History ==
=== Origin ===
Between 641 AD and 705 AD some kings, except Jayasimha I and Mangi Yuvaraja, ruled for very short durations. Then followed a period of unrest characterised by family feuds and weak rulers. Meanwhile, the Rashtrakutas of Malkhed ousted Western Chalukyas of Badami. The weak rulers of Vengi had to meet the challenge of the Rashtrakutas, who overran their kingdom more than once. There was no Eastern Chalukya ruler who could check them until Gunaga Vijayaditya III came to power in 848 AD. The then Rashtrakuta ruler Amoghavarsha treated him as his ally and after Amoghavarsha's death, Vijayaditya proclaimed independence.

=== Decline ===
After the decline of the Rashtrakuta power, the Kakatiyas who were former vassals of the Western Chalukyas, assumed sovereignty by suppressing other Chalukya subordinates in the Telangana region.

== Administration ==
In its early life, the Eastern Chalukya court was essentially a republic of Badami, and as generations passed, local factors gained in strength and the Vengi monarchy developed features of its own. External influences still continued to be present as the Eastern Chalukyas had long and intimate contact, either friendly or hostile, with the Pallavas, the Rashtrakutas, the Cholas and the Chalukyas of Kalyani.

=== Type of Government ===
The Eastern Chalukyas and main neighbouring polities in South Asia circa 800 CE.

The Eastern Chalukyan government was a monarchy based on the Hindu philosophy. The inscriptions refer to the traditional seven components of the state (Saptanga), and the eighteen Tirthas (Offices), such as:

- Mantri (Minister)
- Purohita (Chaplain)
- Senapati (Commander)
- Yuvaraja (Heir-apparent)
- Dauvarika (Door keeper)
- Pradhana (Chief)
- Adhyaksha (Head of department) and so on.

No information is available as to how the work of administration was carried out. The Vishaya and Kottam were the administrative subdivisions known from records. The Karmarashtra and the Boya-Kottams are examples of these. The royal edicts (recording gifts of lands or villages) are addressed to all Naiyogi Kavallabhas, a general term containing no indication of their duties, as well as to the Grameyakas, the residents of the village granted. The Manneyas are also occasionally referred in inscriptions. They held assignments of land or revenue in different villages.

Fratricidal wars and foreign invasions frequently disturbed the land. The territory was parcelled out into many small principalities (estates) held by the nobility consisting of collateral branches of the ruling house such as those of Elamanchili, Pithapuram and Mudigonda, and a few other families such as the Kona Haihayas, Kalachuris, Kolanu Saronathas, Chagis, Parichedas, Kota Vamsas, Velanadus and Kondapadamatis, closely connected by marriage ties with the Eastern Chalukyas and families who were raised to high position for their loyal services. When the Vengi ruler was strong, the nobility paid allegiance and tribute to him, but when the weakness was apparent, they were ready to join hands with the enemies against the royal house.

== Society ==
The population in the Vengi country was heterogeneous in character. The society was based on hereditary caste system. Even the Buddhists and Jains who originally disregarded caste, adopted it. Besides the four traditional castes, minor communities like Boyas and Savaras (Tribal groups) also existed.

The Brahmins were held in high esteem in the society. They were proficient in Vedas and Shastras and were given gifts of land and money. They held lucrative posts such as councillors, ministers and members of civil service. They even entered the army and some of them rose to positions of high command. The Kshatriyas were the ruling class. Their love of intrigue and fighting was responsible for civil war for two centuries. The Komatis (Vaishyas) were a flourishing trading community. Their organisation into a powerful guild (Nakaram) which had its headquarters in Penugonda (West Godavari) and branches in seventeen other centres had its beginnings in this period. It seems there used to be a minister for communal affairs (Samaya Mantri) in the government. The Shudras constituted the bulk of the population and there were several sub-castes among them. The army furnished a career for most of them and some of them acquired the status of Samanta Raju and Mandalika.

== Religion ==
Hinduism was the prominent religion of the Eastern Chalukya kingdom, with Shaivism being more popular than Vaishnavism. The Mahasena temple at Chebrolu became famous for its annual Jatra, which involved a procession of the deity's idol from Chebrolu to Vijayawada and back. Some of the rulers, declared themselves as Parama Maheswaras (Emperors). The Buddhist religious centres eventually attained great celebrity as Siva pilgrim centres. Eastern Chalukya rulers like Vijayaditya II, Yuddhamalla I, Vijayaditya III and Bhima I took active interest in the construction of many temples. The temple establishments like dancers and musicians show that during this period, temples were not only a centre of religious worship but a fostering ground for fine arts.

Buddhism, which was dominant during the Satavahanas was in decline. Its monasteries were practically deserted. Due to their love of sacred relics in stupas, a few might have lingered on, Xuanzang noticed some twenty or more Buddhist monasteries in which more than three thousand monks lived.

Jainism, unlike Buddhism, continued to enjoy some support from the people. This is evident from the several deserted images in ruined villages all over Andhra. The inscriptions also record the construction of Jain temples and grants of land for their support from the monarchs and the people. The rulers like Kubja Vishnuvardhana, Vishnuvardhana III and Amma II patronised Jainism. Vimaladitya even became a declared follower of the doctrine of Mahavira. Vijayawada, Jenupadu, Penugonda (West Godavari) and Munugodu were the famous Jain centres of the period.

== Literature ==
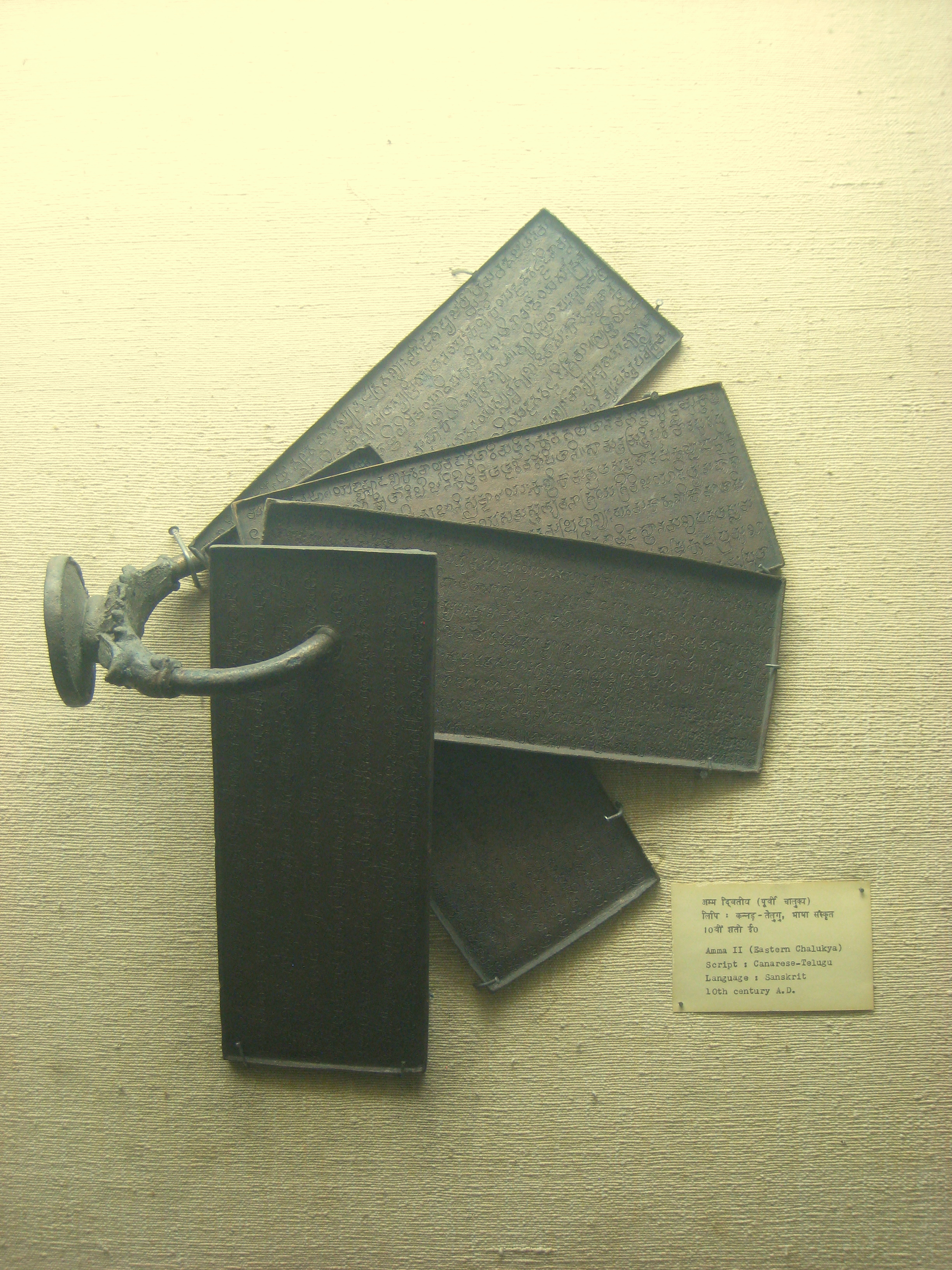
c. 10th century Sanskrit copper plates of Amma II written in Kannada–Telugu script.

Early Telugu literature was at its zenith during this period. Vipparla Inscription of Jayasimha I and the Lakshmipuram inscription of the Mangi yuvaraja were the earliest Telugu inscriptions of Eastern chalukyas found in 7 century AD.

The copper plate grants of the early Eastern Chalukyas of Vengi are written in Sanskrit, but a few charters like the Aladankaram plates are written partly in Sanskrit and partly in Telugu

Telugu poetry makes its early appearance in the Addanki, Kandukur and Dharmavaram inscriptions of Pandaranga, Army Chief of Vijayaditya III, in the later half of the 9th century. However, literary compositions dating earlier than 11th century CE are not clearly known. Nannaya was the poet-laureate of Rajaraja Narendra in the middle of the 11th century. An erudite scholar, he was well-versed in the Vedas, Shastras and the ancient epics, and undertook the translation of the Mahabharata into Telugu. Narayana Bhatta who was proficient in eight languages assisted him in his endeavour. Though incomplete, his work is acclaimed as a masterpiece of Telugu literature.

=== Connection between Kannada and Telugu literature ===
Kubja Vishnuvardhana, the founder of the Eastern Chalukya dynasty, was the brother of the Chalukya king, Pulakeshin II. The Chalukyas therefore governed both the Karnataka and Andhra countries and patronised Telugu as well. This very likely led to a close connection to Kannada literature. A number of Telugu authors of the age also wrote in Kannada Nannaya-Bhatta's Bharata includes the Akkara, a metre considered unique to Kannada works. The same metre is also found in Yudhamalla's Bezwada inscription. Another inscription notes that Narayana-Bhatta, who assisted Nannaya-Bhatta in composing the Bharata, was a Kannada poet and was granted a village by Rajaraja Narendra in 1053 for his contribution. Kannada poets, Adikavi Pampa and Nagavarma I, also hailed from families originally from Vengi.

== Architecture ==
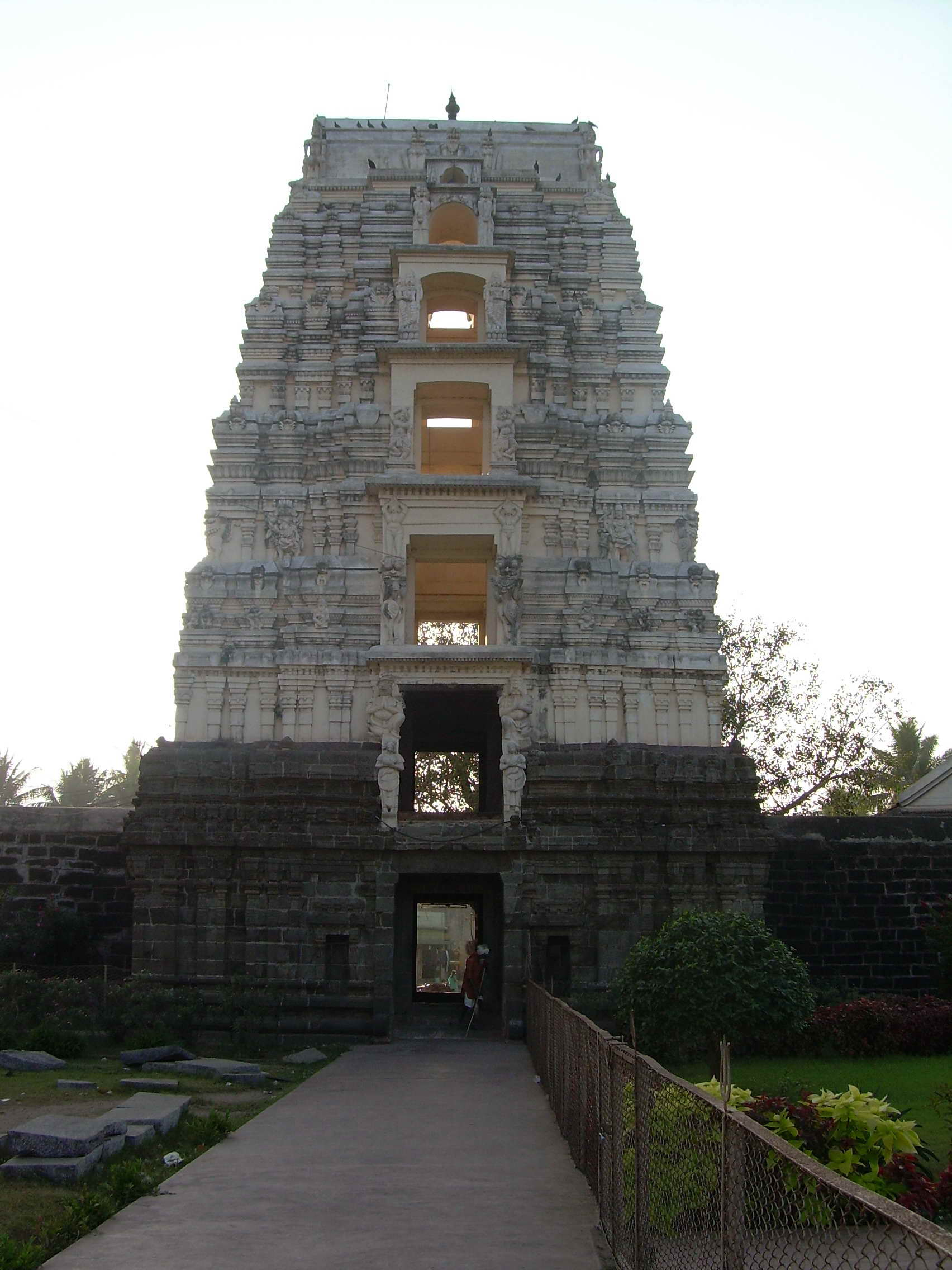
The Bhimesvara temple at Draksharama

Due to the widely spread Shiva devotional practice in the kingdom, the Eastern Chalukyan kings undertook the construction of temples on a large scale. Vijayaditya II is credited with the construction of 108 temples. Yuddhamalla I erected a temple to Kartikeya at Vijayawada. Bhima I constructed the famous Draksharama and Chalukya Bhimavaram (Samalkot) temples. Rajaraja Narendra erected three memorial shrines at Kalidindi (West Godavari). The Eastern Chalukyas, following the Pallava and Chalukya traditions, developed their own independent style of architecture, which is visible in the Pancharama shrines (especially the Draksharama temple) and Biccavolu temples. The Golingesvara temple at Biccavolu contains some richly carved out sculptures of deities like Ardhanarisvara, Shiva, Vishnu, Agni, Chamundi and Surya.

Ambapuram cave temple is Jain cave temple constructed by Eastern Chalukyas in the 7th century. During the 7th—8th century CE, a total of five Jain caves were constructed in Ambapuram and Adavinekkalam hills.

== Rulers ==
- Kubja Vishnuvardhana I (624 – 641)
- Jayasimha I (641 – 673)
- Indra Bhattaraka (673, seven days)
- Vishnuvardhana II (673 – 682)
- Mangi Yuvaraja (682 – 706)
- Jayasimha II (706 – 718)
- Kokkili (718–719, six months)
- Vishnuvardhana III (719 – 755)
- Vijayaditya I Bhattaraka (755 – 772)
- Vishnuvardhana IV Vishnuraja (772 – 808)
- Vijayaditya II (808 – 847)
- Kali Vishnuvardhana V (847– 849)
- Gunaga Vijayaditya III (849 – 892) with his two brothers Yuvaraja Vikramaditya I and Yuddhamalla I
- Bhima I Dronarjuna (17 April 892 – 921)
- Vijayaditya IV Kollabiganda (921, six months)
- Amma I Vishnuvardhana VI (921 – 927)
- Vijayaditya V Beta (927, fifteen days)
- Tadapa (927, one month)
- Vikramaditya II (927 – 928, eleven months)
- Bhima II (928 – 929, eight months)
- Yuddhamalla II (929 – 934)
- Bhima III Vishnuvardhana VII (934 – 945)
- Amma II Vijayaditya VI (5 December 945 – 970)
- Danarnava (970 – 973)
- Jata Choda Bhima (973 – 999) (usurp.)
- Shaktivarman I Chalukyacandra (999 – 1011)
- Vimaladitya (10 May 1011 – 1018)
- Rajaraja Narendra I Vishnuvardhana VIII (16 August 1022 – 1061)
- Shaktivarman II (1061–1063)
- Vijayaditya VII (1063–1068, 1072–1075)
- Rajaraja II (1075–1079)
- Virachola Vishnuvardhana IX (1079–1102)

Timeline and cultural period	Indus plain (Punjab-Sapta Sindhu-Gujarat)	Gangetic Plain			Central India	Southern India
Timeline and cultural period	Indus plain (Punjab-Sapta Sindhu-Gujarat)	Upper Gangetic Plain (Ganga-Yamuna doab)	Middle Gangetic Plain	Lower Gangetic Plain	Central India	Southern India
IRON AGE
Culture	Late Vedic Period	Late Vedic Period; Painted Grey Ware culture	Late Vedic Period; Northern Black Polished Ware		Pre-history	
6th century BCE	Gandhara	Kuru-Panchala	Magadha		Adivasi (tribes)	Assaka
Culture	Persian-Greek influences	"Second Urbanisation"; Rise of Shramana movements Jainism - Buddhism - Ājīvika - Yoga			Pre-history	
5th century BCE	(Persian conquests)		Shaishunaga dynasty		Adivasi (tribes)	Assaka
4th century BCE	(Greek conquests)	Nanda empire				
HISTORICAL AGE
Culture	Spread of Buddhism				Pre-history	
3rd century BCE	Maurya Empire					Satavahana dynasty Sangam period (300 BCE – 200 CE); Early Cholas; Early Pandyan kingdom Cheras
Culture	Preclassical Hinduism (Note: Michaels (2004) p.39) - "Hindu Synthesis" (Note: Hiltebeitel (2002)) (ca. 200 BCE - 300 CE) (Note: Michaels (2004) p.39) (Note: Hiltebeitel (2002)); Epics - Puranas - Ramayana - Mahabharata - Bhagavad Gita - Brahma Sutras - Smarta Tradition; Mahayana Buddhism					
2nd century BCE	Indo-Greek Kingdom		Shunga Empire; Maha-Meghavahana Dynasty			Satavahana dynasty Sangam period (300 BCE – 200 CE); Early Cholas; Early Pandyan kingdom Cheras
1st century BCE	Indo-Greek Kingdom		Shunga Empire; Maha-Meghavahana Dynasty			Satavahana dynasty Sangam period (300 BCE – 200 CE); Early Cholas; Early Pandyan kingdom Cheras
1st century CE	Indo-Scythians; Indo-Parthians		Kuninda Kingdom			Satavahana dynasty Sangam period (300 BCE – 200 CE); Early Cholas; Early Pandyan kingdom Cheras
2nd century	Kushan Empire					Satavahana dynasty Sangam period (300 BCE – 200 CE); Early Cholas; Early Pandyan kingdom Cheras
3rd century	Kushano-Sasanian Kingdom; Western Satraps	Kushan Empire		Kamarupa kingdom	Adivasi (tribes)	Satavahana dynasty Sangam period (300 BCE – 200 CE); Early Cholas; Early Pandyan kingdom Cheras
Culture	"Golden Age of Hinduism"(ca. CE 320-650) (Note: Michaels (2004) p.40); Puranas - Kural; Co-existence of Hinduism and Buddhism					
4th century	Kidarites	Gupta Empire; Varman dynasty				Andhra Ikshvakus; Kalabhra dynasty Kadamba Dynasty; Western Ganga Dynasty
5th century	Hephthalite Empire	Alchon Huns				Vishnukundina; Kalabhra dynasty
6th century	Nezak Huns; Kabul Shahi; Maitraka				Adivasi (tribes)	Vishnukundina; Badami Chalukyas; Kalabhra dynasty
Culture	Late-Classical Hinduism (ca. CE 650-1100) (Note: Michaels (2004) p.41); Advaita Vedanta - Tantra; Decline of Buddhism in India					
7th century	Indo-Sassanids		Vakataka dynasty Empire of Harsha	Mlechchha dynasty	Adivasi (tribes)	Badami Chalukyas; Eastern Chalukyas; Pandyan kingdom (revival); Pallava
7th century	Karkota dynasty				Adivasi (tribes)	
8th century	Kabul Shahi	Pala Empire			Adivasi (tribes)	Eastern Chalukyas; Pandyan kingdom Kalachuri
9th century	Gurjara-Pratihara				Adivasi (tribes)	Rashtrakuta Empire; Eastern Chalukyas; Pandyan kingdom Medieval Cholas; Chera Perumals of Makkotai
10th century	Ghaznavids			Pala dynasty Kamboja-Pala dynasty	Adivasi (tribes)	Kalyani Chalukyas; Eastern Chalukyas; Medieval Cholas; Chera Perumals of Makkotai; Rashtrakuta
References and sources for table References Sources: Flood, Gavin D. (1996), An Introduction to Hinduism, Cambridge University Press; Hiltebeitel, Alf (2002), Hinduism. In: Joseph Kitagawa, "The Religious Traditions of Asia: Religion, History, and Culture", Routledge; Michaels, Axel (2004), Hinduism. Past and present, Princeton, New Jersey: Princeton University Press
