= List of Indian monarchs =

This article is a list of the various dynasties and monarchs that have ruled in the Indian subcontinent and it is one of several lists of incumbents.

The earliest Indian rulers are known from epigraphical sources found in archeological inscriptions on Ashokan edicts written in Prakrit and using the Brahmi script. They are also known from the literary sources such as Hindu literature, Jain literature and Buddhist literature in context of literary sources. Archaeological sources include archeological remains in the Indian subcontinent which give many details about earlier kingdoms, monarchs, and their interactions with each other.

Early types of historic documentation include metal coins with an indication of the ruler, or at least the dynasty, at the time. These punch-marked coins were issued around 600s BCE and are found in abundance from the Maurya Empire in 300s BCE. There are also stone inscriptions and documentary records from foreign cultures from around this time. The main imperial or quasi-imperial rulers of North India are fairly clear from this point on, but many local rulers, and the situation in the Deccan and South India has less clear stone inscriptions from early centuries. Main sources of South Indian history is Sangam literature dated from 300s BCE. Time period of ancient Indian rulers is speculative, or at least uncertain.

== Vedic India (c. 6000s – 200s BCE) ==
=== Kingdom of Magadha ===
List of monarchs of Magadha

=== Kingdom of Kashmir ===
List of monarchs of Kashmir

=== Gandhara Kingdom (Mahabaratha) ===
Kings of Gandhara

=== Kuru Kingdom (c. 1200 – 345 BCE) ===
List of Kuru kings

=== Kingdom of Avanti (c. 1100 – 400 BCE) ===
Haiheyas

1. Maharaj Adarsh
2. Maharaj Ayu
3. Maharaj Nahusha
4. Maharaj Yayati
5. Maharaj Yadu
6. Sahasrajit
7. Satajit
8. Mahahaya, Renuhaya and Haihaya (the founder of Haihaya Kingdom). (Contemporary to Suryavanshi king Mandhatri)
9. Dharma was the son of Haihaya.
10. Netra
11. Kunti
12. Sohanji
13. Mahishman was the founder of Mahishmati on the banks of River Narmada.
14. Bhadrasenaka (Bhadrasena) (Contemporary to Suryavanshi king Trishanku)
15. Durmada (Contemporary to Suryavanshi king Harischandra)
16. Durdama
17. Bhima
18. Samhata
19. Kanaka
20. Dhanaka
21. Krtavirya, Krtagni, Krtavarma and Krtauja. (Contemporary to Suryavanshi king Rohitashva)
22. Sahasrabahu Kartavirya Arjuna was the son of Krtavirya who ruled 88 years and was finally killed by Lord Parashurama.
23. Jayadhwaja, Vrshabha, Madhu and Urujit were left by Parshurama and 995 others were killed by Lord Parashurama. Pajanya was adopted by Kroshta king Devamidha
24. Talajangha (Contemporary to Suryavanshi king Asita)
25. Vithihotra (Contemporary to Suryavanshi king Sagara)
26. Madhu
27. Vrshni

Pradyota dynasty

=== Videha (c. 1100 – 700 BCE) ===
Kings of Videha

1. Videgha Mathava - Founder of Videha
2. Nimi - Earliest ancestor of Janaka Dynasty
3. Mithi - First Janaka and founder of Mithila
4. Udavasu - Second Janaka
5. Nandivardhana - Third Janaka
6. Suketu - Fourth Janaka
7. Devarata Janaka - Fifth Janaka
8. Brihadvrata
9. Mahavira
10. Sudhriti
11. Dristaketu
12. Haryasva
13. Maru
14. Pratindhaka
15. Kritiratha
16. Devamidha
17. Vibhuta
18. Mahidhrata
19. Kirtirata
20. Mahorama
21. Svarnorama
22. Hrasvaroma
23. Seeradhvaja (father of Sita in Ramayana) - Twenty first Janaka
24. Bhaanumaan
25. Shatadyumna
26. Shuchi
27. Oorjanaamaa
28. Kriti
29. Anjana
30. Kurujit
31. Arishtanemi
32. Shrutaayu
33. Supaarshva
34. Srinjaya
35. Kshemaavee
36. Anenaa
37. Bhaumaratha
38. Satyaratha
39. Upagu
40. Upagupta
41. Svaagata
42. Svaananda
43. Suvarchaa
44. Supaarshwa
45. Subhaasha
46. Sushruta
47. Jaya
48. Vijaya
49. Rita
50. Sunaya
51. Veetahavya
52. Dhriti
53. Bahulashva
54. Kriti

Apart from the above list of Janakas, there more Janakas mentioned in different texts:

1. Karala Janaka
2. Dharmadhwaja Janaka
3. Janadeva Janaka
4. Keshidhwaja Janaka
5. Khandikya Janaka

=== Kalinga Kingdom (c. 1100 – 261 BCE) ===
Kings of Kalinga

=== Kosala Kingdom (c. 1100 – 345 BCE) ===
Kings of Kosala:

- Brihadbala
- Brihatkshaya
- Urukriya
- Vatsavyuha
- Prativyoma
- Bhaanu
- Divakara
- Veer Sahadeva
- Brihadashva
- Bhanuratha
- Pratitashva
- Supratika
- Marudeva
- Sunakshatra
- Pushkara
- Antariksha
- Suvarna
- Bruhadaraaj
- Kritanjaya
- Ranajjaya
- Sanjaya Mahakoshala or Jayasena
- Prasenajit
- Virudhaka
- Sumitra

=== Panchala Kingdom (c. 1100 BCE – 350 CE) ===
Kings of Panchala:

- Rishin
- Brihadbhanu, (son of Brihadvasu)
- Brihatkaya
- Puranjaya
- Riksha
- Bramhyaswa
- Aramyaswa
- Mudgala, Yavinara, Pratiswan, Maharaja Kampilya - (founder of Kampilya capital of Panchala Kingdom)
- Sranjaya, (son of Aramyaswa)
- Dritimana
- Drdhanemi
- Sarvasena, (founder of Ujjain Kingdom)
- Mitra
- Rukmaratha
- Suparswa
- Sumathi
- Sannatimana
- Krta
- Pijavana
- Somadutta
- Jantuvahana
- Badhrayaswa
- Brihadhishu
- Brihadhanu
- Brihadkarma
- Jayaratha
- Visvajit
- Seinyajit
- Nepavirya, (after this King's name the country was named Nepaldesh)
- Samara
- Sadashva
- Ruchiraswa
- Pruthusena
- Prapti
- Prthaswa
- Sukrthi
- Vibhiraja
- Anuha
- Bramhadatta II
- Vishwaksena
- Dandasena
- Durmukha
- Durbuddhi
- Dharbhya
- Divodasa
- Sivana I
- Mitrayu
- Maitrayana
- Soma
- Sivana II
- Sadasana
- Sahadeva
- Somaka, (Somaka's eldest son was Sugandakrthu and youngest was Prishata. But in a war all sons died and Prishata Survived and became the king of Panchala)
- Prishati, (son of Somaka)
- Drupada, (son of Prishata)
- Dhrishtadyumna, (was the son of Drupada, Draupadi and Shikhandi were the daughters of Drupada)
- Keśin Dālbhya
- Pravahana Jaivali
- Achyuta, (last known ruler of Panchala Kingdom which was defeated in c. 350 CE by Gupta ruler Samudragupta.)

=== Anga Kingdom (c. 1100 – 530 BCE) ===
Kings of Anga:

- Maharaj Anga - (founder of the kingdom and son of King Bali)
- Romapada
- Brihadratha
- Angaraj Karna
- Vrishaketu - (son of Karna)
- Tamralipta
- Lomapada
- Chitraratha
- Vrihadratha
- Vasuhoma
- Dhatarattha
- Dhadivahana
- Brahmadatta - (last king of Anga kingdom)

=== Kamboja Kingdom (c. 700 – 200 BCE) ===
Kings of Kamboja:

- Kamatha
- Chandravarma Kamboja
- Kamatha Kamboja
- Prapaksha Kamboja
- Sudakshina Kamboja
- Srindra Varmana Kamboj

=== Shakya Republic (c. 7th to 5th century BCE) ===
Rulers of Shakya:

- Shakya
- Sihahanu
- Śuddhodana
- Siddhartha Shakya (aka Gautama Buddha)
- Rāhula

Later Shakya Republic was conquered by Virudhaka of Kosala.

=== Kingdom of Tambapanni (c. 543 – 437 BCE) ===
Portrait	Name	Birth	Death	Reign (BCE)		Marriages	Claim
Portrait	Name	Birth	Death	Start	End	Marriages	Claim
Vijaya	Vijaya	? Sinhapura son of Sinhabahu, and Sinhasivali	505; Tambapanni	543	505	Kuveni two children Pandu Princes	Founded Kingdom; Marriage to Kuveni
	Upatissa (regent)	-	-	505	504		Prince Vijaya's Chief Minister
	Panduvasdeva	-	-	504	474		Nephew of Vijaya
	Abhaya	-	-	474	454		Son of Panduvasdeva
	Tissa (regent)	-	-	454	437		Younger brother of Abhaya

== Ancient and early medieval Southern Indian dynasties ==
=== Pandya dynasty (c. 600 BCE–1650 CE) ===
==== Early Pandyans ====
- Koon Pandiyan - (Earliest Known Pandyan king)
- Nedunj Cheliyan I (Aariyap Padai Kadantha Nedunj Cheliyan), he was mentioned in legend of Kannagi
- Pudappandiyan
- Mudukudumi Paruvaludhi
- Nedunj Cheliyan II (Pasumpun Pandiyan)
- Nan Maran
- Nedunj Cheliyan III (Talaiyaalanganathu Seruvendra Nedunj Cheliyan)
- Maran Valudi
- Musiri Mutriya Cheliyan
- Ukkirap Peruvaluthi

==== Middle Pandyans (c. 590–920 CE) ====
- Kadungon (590–620 CE)
- Maravarman Avani Culamani (c. 620–645 CE)
- Jayantavarman (c. 645–670 CE)
- Arikesari Maravarman Nindraseer Nedumaaran (c. 670–710 CE)
- Kochadaiyan Ranadhiran (710–735 CE)
- Arikesari Parankusa Maravarman Rajasimha I (735–765)
- Parantaka Nedunjadaiyan (765–815)
- Rasasingan II (790–800)
- Varagunan I (800–830)
- Srimara Srivallabha (815–862)
- Varagunavarman II (862–880)
- Parantaka Viranarayana (880–900)
- Maravarman Rajasimha II (900–920)

==== Pandyans under Chola Empire (c. 920–1216 CE) ====
- Sundara Pandyan I
- Vira Pandyan I
- Vira Pandyan II
- Amarabhujanga Tivrakopa
- Jatavarman Sundara Chola Pandyan
- Maravarman Vikrama Chola Pandyan
- Maravarman Parakrama Chola Pandyan
- Jatavarman Chola Pandya
- Seervallabha Manakulachala (1101–1124)
- Maaravaramban Seervallaban (1132–1161)
- Parakrama Pandyan I (1161–1162)
- Kulasekara Pandyan III
- Vira Pandyan III
- Jatavarman Srivallaban (1175–1180)
- Jatavarman Kulasekaran I (1190–1216)

==== Pandalam dynasty (Later Pandyans) (c. 1212–1345 CE) ====
- Parakrama Pandyan II (1212–1215)
- Maravarman Sundara Pandyan (1216–1238)
- Sadayavarman Kulasekaran II (1238–1240)
- Maravarman Sundara Pandyan II (1238–1251)
- Jatavarman Sundara Pandyan (1251–1268)
- Maaravarman Kulasekara Pandyan I (1268–1308)
- Sundara Pandyan IV (1309–1327)
- Vira Pandyan IV (1309–1345)

==== Tenkasi Pandya dynasty (c. 1422–1650 CE) ====
During the 15th century, the Pandyans lost their traditional capital city Madurai because of the Islamic and Nayaks invasion, and were forced to move their capital to Tirunelveli in southern Tamilakam and existed there as vassals.

- Cataiyavarman Parakrama Pandyan (1422–1463)
- Cataiyavarman III Kulasekara Pandyan (1429–1473)
- Azhagan Perumal Parakrama Pandyan (1473–1506)
- Kulasekara Pandyan (1479–1499)
- Cataiyavarman Civallappa Pandyan (1534–1543)
- Parakrama Kulasekara Pandyan (1543–1552)
- Nelveli Maran (1552–1564)
- Cataiyavarman Adiveerama Pandyan (1564–1604)
- Varathunga Pandyan (1588–1612)
- Varakunarama Pandyan (1613–1618)
- Kollankondan (1618–1650)

=== Chera dynasty (c. 600 BCE–1530 CE) ===
Ancient Chera kings

Kongu Cheras (c. 400–844 CE)

Makotai Cheras

Venadu Cheras (Kulasekharas) (c. 1090–1530 CE):

- Rama Kulasekhara (1090–1102)
- Kotha Varma Marthandam (1102–1125)
- Vira Kerala Varma I (1125–1145)
- Kodai Kerala Varma (1145–1150)
- Vira Ravi Varma (1145–1150)
- Vira Kerala Varma II (1164–1167)
- Vira Aditya Varma (1167–1173)
- Vira Udaya Martanda Varma (1173–1192)
- Devadaram Vira Kerala Varma III (1192–1195)
- Vira Manikantha Rama Varma Tiruvadi (1195- ?)
- Vira Rama Kerala Varma Tiruvadi (1209–1214)
- Vira Ravi Kerala Varma Tiruvadi (1214–1240)
- Vira Padmanabha Martanda Varma Tiruvadi (1240–1252)
- Ravi Varma (1252–1313)
- Vira Udaya Martanda Varma (1313–1333)
- Aditya Varma Tiruvadi (1333–1335)
- Vira Rama Udaya Martanda Varma Tiruvadi (1335–1342)
- Vira Kerala Varma Tiruvadi (1342–1363)
- Vira Martanda Varma III (1363–1366)
- Vira Rama Martanda Varma (1366–1382)
- Vira Ravi Varma (1383–1416)
- Vira Ravi Ravi Varma (1416–1417)
- Vira Kerala Martanda Varma (1383)
- Chera Udaya Martanda Varma (1383–1444)
- Vira Ravi Varma (1444–1458)
- Sankhara Sri Vira Rama Martanda Varma (1458–1468)
- Vira Kodai Sri Aditya Varma (1468–1484
- Vira Ravi Ravi Varma (1484–1503)
- Martanda Varma, Kulasekhara Perumal (1503–1504)
- Vira Ravi Kerala Varma, Kulasekhara Perumal (1504–1530)

=== Chola dynasty (c. 600 BCE–1279 CE) ===
==== Ancient Chola kings (c. 600 BCE – 300 CE) ====
- Eri Oliyan Vaendhi
- Maandhuvaazhi
- El Mei Nannan
- Keezhai Kinjuvan
- Vazhisai Nannan
- Mei Kiyagusi Aerru
- Aai Kuzhi Agusi Aerru
- Thizhagan Maandhi
- Maandhi Vaelan
- Aai Adumban
- Ilamcetcenni
- Karikala Chola
- Nedunkilli
- Nalankilli
- Killivalavan
- Perunarkilli
- Kocengannan
- Nalluruththiran

=== Velir dynasties (c. 300 BCE–1200 CE) ===
Major dynasties of Velir are-

- Vēl Pāri
- Ilanji Vel
- Irunkōvēl
- Athiyamān
- Malayamān
- Malaiyamān Thirumudi Kāri
- Athiyamān Nedumān Añci
- Vaiyāvik Kōpperum Pēkan

=== Ay dynasty (Velir) (c. 300 BCE–800 CE) ===
==== Early Ay Kings ====
- Ay Andiran
- Ay Titiyan
- Ay Atiyan

==== Medieval Ay Kings ====
- Chadayan Karunanthan
- Karunanthadakkkan Srivallabha (r. 856–884 CE)
- Vikramaditya Varaguna (r. 884–911 CE)

=== Kadamba dynasties (c. 345–1310 CE) ===
==== Principality of Banavasi (c. 345–540 CE) ====
Banavasi branch rulers-

- Mayurasharma (345–365)
- Kangavarma (365–390)
- Bhageerath (390–415)
- Raghu (415–435)
- Kakusthavarma (435–455)
- Santivarma (455–460)
- Shiva Mandhatri (460–475)
- Mrigeshavarma (475–485)
- Ravivarma (485–519)
- Harivarma (519–530)

Triparvatha branch rulers-

- Krishna Varma I (455–475)
- Vishnuvarma (475–485)
- Simhavarma (485–516)
- Krishna Varma II (516–540)

==== Principality of Goa (c. 960–1345 CE) ====
- Shashthadeva I alis Kantakacharya (c. 960 CE), founder of dynasty
- Nagavarma
- Guhalladeva I
- Shashathadeva II
- Guhalladeva II (1038–1042)
- Veeravarmadeva (1042–1054)
- Jayakeshi I (1054–1080)
- Guhalladeva II alias Tribhuvanamalla (1080–1125)
- Vijayaditya I alias Vijayarka, (ruling prince up to 1104)
- Jayakeshi II (1125–1148)
- Shivachitta alis Paramadideva (1148–1179)
- Vishnuchitta alias Vijayaditya II (1179–1187)
- Jayakeshi III (1188–1216)
- Vajradeva alis Shivachitta (regin?)
- Sovideva alis Tribhuvanamalla (1216–1246?)
- Shashthadeva III (?1246–1265)
- Kamadeva (1265–1310), last known ruler of dynasty

==== Principality of Hangal (c. 980–1275 CE) ====
known rulers are-

- Chattadeva (980–1031), founder of dynasty
- Kamadeva
- Somadeva
- Mayuravarma

==== Other minor Kadamba principalities ====
Kadambas of Halasi
Kadambas of Bankapur
Kadambas of Bayalnad
Kadambas of Nagarkhanda
Kadambas of Uchchangi
Kadambas of Bayalnadu (Vainadu)

=== Chutu dynasty of Banavasi (c. 100 BCE–200 CE) ===
List of rulers of Banavasi

=== Vishnukundina dynasty of Denduluru (c. 420–624 CE) ===
List of rulers of Denduluru

=== Chalukya dynasty (c. 500–1200 CE) ===
Ruler	Born	Reign	Capital/ Ruling part	Consort	Death	Notes
Jayasimha I	?	500–520	Badami	? at least one child	520	First ruler of the dynasty.
Ranaraga	? Son of Jayasimha I	520–540	Badami	? at least one child	540	
Pulakeshin I	? Son of Ranaraga	540–567	Badami	Durlabhadevi at least two children	567	
Kirtivarman I	? Sons of Pulakeshin I and Durlabhadevi	567–592	Badami	? at least two children	592	
Mangalesha	? Sons of Pulakeshin I and Durlabhadevi	592–610	Badami	? at least one child	610	
Pulakeshin II	? First son of Kirtivarman I	610–642	Badami	? five children	642	Children of Kirtivarman I, divided their inheritance.
Kubja Vishnuvardhana I	? Second son of Kirtivarman I	610–641	Vengi (Eastern)	? two children	641	Children of Kirtivarman I, divided their inheritance.
Jayasimha I	? First son of Vishnuvardhana I	641–673	Vengi (Eastern)	?	673	
Adityavarman	? First son of Pulakeshin II	642–645	Badami	? one child	645	Children of Pulakeshin II, divided their inheritance. The second son's filiation is however not certain, and based on chronology and in the name Chalukya which was adopted also by his descendants.
Satyashraya	? Second son (?) of Pulakeshin II	642–675	Vemulavada	? at least one child	675	Children of Pulakeshin II, divided their inheritance. The second son's filiation is however not certain, and based on chronology and in the name Chalukya which was adopted also by his descendants.
Abhinavaditya	? Son of Adityavarman	645–646	Badami	?	645	
Chandraditya	? Third son of Pulakeshin II	646–649	Badami	Vijaya-Bhattarika one child	649	
Regency of Vijaya-Bhattarika (649–655)						Regent for her minor son. She was deposed by her brother-in-law.
A son of Chandraditya	? Son of Chandraditya and Vijaya-Bhattarika	649–655	Badami	?	655	Regent for her minor son. She was deposed by her brother-in-law.
Vikramaditya I	? Fourth son of Pulakeshin II	655–680	Badami	Gangamahadevi at least one child	680	
Indra Bhattaraka	? Second son of Vishnuvardhana I	673	Vengi (Eastern)	? at least one child	673	
Vishnuvardhana II	? Son of Indra Bhattaraka	673–682	Vengi (Eastern)	? at least one child	682	
Prithvipathi	? Son of Satyashraya	675–700	Vemulavada	? at least one child	700	
Vinayaditya	? Son of Vikramaditya I	680–696	Badami	? at least one child	696	
Mangi Yuvaraja	? Son of Vishnuvardhana II	682–706	Vengi (Eastern)	? at least one child	706	
Vijayaditya I	? Son of Vinayaditya	696–733	Badami	? at least one child	733	
Maharaja	? Son of Prithvipathi	700–725	Vemulavada	? at least one child	725	
Jayasimha II	? Sons of Vishnuvardhana II	706–718	Vengi (Eastern)	? at least one child	718	
Kokkli	? Sons of Vishnuvardhana II	718–719	Vengi (Eastern)	? at least one child	719	
Vishnuvardhana III	? Sons of Vishnuvardhana II	719–755	Vengi (Eastern)	? at least one child	755	
Rajaditya	? Son of Maharaja	725–750	Vemulavada	? at least one child	750	
Vikramaditya II	? Son of Vijayaditya I	733–746	Badami	? at least one child	746	
Kirtivarman II Rahappa	? Son of Vikramaditya II	746–757	Badami	? at least one child	757	
Annexed to the Rashtrakuta Empire
Vinayaditya Yuddhamalla I	? Son of Rajaditya	750–775	Vemulavada	? at least one child	775	Considered the first effectively independent ruler of Vemulavada. Vassal of the Rashtrakuta dynasty.
Vijayaditya I Bhattaraka	? Sons of Vishnuvardhana II	755–772	Vengi (Eastern)	? at least one child	772	His sister Silamahadevi married Dhruva Dharavarsha, ruler of the Rashtrakuta Empire.
Vishnuvardhana IV Vishnuraja	? Sons of Vishnuvardhana II	772–808	Vengi (Eastern)	Silabhattarika of the Rashtrakuta Empire three children	808	Married his first cousin.
Arikesari I	? Son of Vinayaditya Yuddhamalla I	775–800	Vemulavada	? at least two children	800	
Narasimha I	? Son of Arikesari I	800–825	Vemulavada	? at least one child	825	
Vijayaditya II	? Son of Vishnuvardhana IV and Silabhattarika of the Rashtrakuta Empire	808–847	Vengi (Eastern)	? at least one child	847	
Yuddhamalla II	? Son of Narasimha I	825–850	Vemulavada	? at least one child	850	
Kali Vishnuvardhana V	? Son of Vijayaditya II	847–849	Vengi (Eastern)	Shilamadevi of the Rashtrakuta Empire three children	849	Married Shilamadevi, niece of Queen Silabhattarika.
Gunaga Vijayaditya III	? Sons of Vishnuvardhana V and Shilamadevi of the Rashtrakuta Empire	849–892	Vengi (Eastern)	? at least one child	892	Children of Vishnuvardhana V, ruled jointly.
Yuvaraja Vikramaditya I	? Sons of Vishnuvardhana V and Shilamadevi of the Rashtrakuta Empire	849–892	Vengi (Eastern)	? at least one child	892?	Children of Vishnuvardhana V, ruled jointly.
Yuddhamalla I	? Sons of Vishnuvardhana V and Shilamadevi of the Rashtrakuta Empire	849–892	Vengi (Eastern)	? at least one child	892?	Children of Vishnuvardhana V, ruled jointly.
Baddega I Soladaganda	? Son of Yuddhamalla II	850–895	Vemulavada	? at least one child	895	
Bhima I Dronarjuna	? Son of Vikramaditya I	892–921	Vengi (Eastern)	? at least one child	921	
Yuddhamalla III	? Son of Baddega I Soladaganda	895–915	Vemulavada	? at least one child	925	
Narasimha II	? Son of Yuddhamalla III	915–930	Vemulavada	? at least one child	930	
Vijayaditya IV	? First son of Bhima I	921	Vengi (Eastern)	? two children	921	Beginning of a civil war in Vengi. During the seven years of the war (921–928), six different kings sat on Vengi's throne.
Vishnuvardhana VI	? First son of Vijayaditya IV	921–927	Vengi (Eastern)	? at least one child	927	
Vijayaditya V	? First son of Vishnuvardhana VI	927	Vengi (Eastern)	?	927	Ruled for fifteen days.
Tala I	? Son of Yuddhamalla I	927	Vengi (Eastern)	? at least one child	927	Ruled for one month.
Vikramaditya II	? Second son of Bhima I	927–928	Vengi (Eastern)	?	928	
Bhima II	? Second son of Vishnuvardhana VI	928	Vengi (Eastern)	?	928	
Yuddhamalla II	? Son of Tala I	928–935	Vengi (Eastern)	? At least one child	935	End of the war. However, the throne still moved between different branches of the family.
Arikesari II	? Son of Narasimha II	930–941	Vemulavada	? at least one child	941	
Vishnuvardhana VII	? Second son of Vijayaditya IV	935–947	Vengi (Eastern)	? at least one child	947	
Bhadradeva Baddega II	? Sons of Arikesari II	941–946	Vemulavada	? at least one child	946	Children of Arikesari II, ruled jointly.
Vagaraja	? Sons of Arikesari II	941–950	Vemulavada	? at least one child	950	Children of Arikesari II, ruled jointly.
Vijayaditya VI	? First son of Bhima II	947–970	Vengi (Eastern)	? At least one child	970	
Arikesari III	? Son of Bhadradeva Baddega II	950–968	Vemulavada	?	968	
Annexed to the Western Chalukya Empire
Danarnava	? Second son of Bhima II	970–973	Vengi (Eastern)	? At least one child	973	
Jata Choda Bhima	?	973–999	Vengi (Eastern)	?	999	Non-dynastic usurper.
Tailapa II Ahvamalla	? Son of Vikramaditya (IV) Chalukya	973–997	Kalyani (Western)	? at least one child	997	Grandson in fifth generation of a brother of Vikramaditya II of Badami. While Vengi was being taken by an usurper on the demise of the Rashtrakuta Empire, Tailapa proclaimed independence from the latter and built a new empire of his own, that saw the re-emergence of the Chalukya dynasty's power.
Satyashraya	? Son of Tailapa II	997–1008	Kalyani (Western)	? at least one child	1008	
Shaktivarman	? First son of Danarnava	999–1011	Vengi (Eastern)	? At least one child	1011	
Vikramaditya V	? First son of Prince Dasavarman and Princess Bhagyavati	1008–1015	Kalyani (Western)	?	1015	Paternal nephew of Satyashraya.
Vimaladitya	? Second son of Danarnava	1011–1018	Vengi (Eastern)	Kundavai of the Chola Empire one child ? one child	1018	
Jayasimha II	? Second son of Prince Dasavarman and Princess Bhagyavati	1015–1043	Kalyani (Western)	Suggaladevi at least one child	1043	
Rajaraja Narendra	? Son of Vimaladitya and Kundavai of the Chola Empire	1018–1031 1035–1061	Vengi (Eastern)	Amangaidevi of the Chola Empire one child	1061	Rajaraja had support in the throne from the Cholas, whose influence grew significantly. He supported Cholas against his cousins, the Western Chalukyas. His own son managed to succeed in the Chola Empire, in 1070, as Kulottunga I, beginning the Later Cholas period, in which the Chola Empire was ruled by a branch of the Eastern Chalukyas renamed Chola, which inherited Narendra's kingdom.
Vijayaditya VII	? Son of Vimaladitya	1031–1035 1061–1075	Vengi (Eastern)	?	1075	Half-brother of Rajaraja, had support from Western Chalukya. After his death Vengi was incorporated in the Chola Empire.
Annexed to the Chola Empire (1061-1118); Annexed to the Western Chalukya Empire (since 1118)
Someshvara I Trilokyamalla	? Son of Jayasimha II and Suggaladevi	1043–1068	Kalyani (Western)	? two children	1068	
Someshvara II Bhuvanaikamalla	? Sons of Someshvara I	1068–1076	Kalyani (Western)	? at least one child	1076	
Vikramaditya VI Tribhuvanamalla	? Sons of Someshvara I	1076–1126	Kalyani (Western)	Chandaladevi; Kethaladevi; Savaladevi at least one child	1126	
Someshvara III	? Son of Vikramaditya VI	1126–1138	Kalyani (Western)	? at least one child	1138	
Jagadhekamalla II	? Son of Someshvara III	1138–1151	Kalyani (Western)	? at least one child	1151	
Tailapa III	? Son of Jagadhekamalla II	1151–1164	Kalyani (Western)	? at least one child	1164	
Jagadhekamalla III	? Son of Tailapa III	1164–1183	Kalyani (Western)	? at least one child	1183	
Someshvara IV	? Son of Jagadhekamalla III	1183–1200	Kalyani (Western)	? at least one child	1200	
Annexed to the Seuna, Hoysala and the Kakatiya dynasties

== Middle Kingdoms (c. 250s BCE – 550s CE) ==
=== Satavahana dynasty (c. 228 BCE – 224 CE) ===
List of Satavahana emperors

=== Mahameghavahana dynasty of Kalinga (c. 225 BCE – 300 CE) ===
- Maharaja Vasu
- Maharaja Mahamegha Vahana
- Sobhanaraja
- Chandraja
- Ksemaraja
- Vakradeva (or) Virdhharaja
- Kharavela (c. 193 BCE–155 BCE)
- Kudepasiri Vakradeva ll
- Vaduka
- Galaveya
- Mana-Sada
- Siri-Sada
- Maha-Sada
- Sivamaka-Sada
- Asaka-Sada

=== Kingdom of Kangleipak (Manipur) (c. 200s BCE –1950 CE) ===
List of Manipuri kings

=== Kuninda Kingdom (c. 2nd century BCE to 3rd century CE) ===
The only known ruler of Kuninda Kingdom is:

- Amoghabhuti (late 2nd to early 1st century BCE)

=== Indo-Greek Kingdom (Yavanarajya) (c. 200 BCE – 10 CE) ===
List of Indo-Greek Kings

=== Indo-Scythian (Saka) (c. 12 BCE – 395 CE) ===
List of Indo-Scythian dynasties and rulers

=== Kushan dynasty (c. 1 – 375 CE) ===
List of Kushan emperors

=== Indo-Parthian (Pahalava) (c. 21 – 100 CE) ===
List of Indo-Parthian kings

=== Indo-Sasanian Kingdom (c. 233 – 365 CE) ===
List of Indo-Sasanian kings

=== Alchon Huns (Huna) (c. 400 – 670 CE) ===
List of Alchon Hun Kings

=== Chutu dynasty of Banavasi (c. 100 BCE–200 CE) ===
Kings of Banavasi

=== Khokhra (Nagvanshi) chieftaincy (c. 64–1952 CE) ===
List of Nagvanshi chiefs

=== Naga Kingdom of Padmavati (c. 170–350 CE) ===
Kings of Padmavati

=== Chandra dynasty of Samatata (c. 202–1050 CE) ===
Rulers of Samatata

=== Kingdom of Abhira (c. 203–370 CE) ===
- Abhira Sivadatta
- Sakasena alias Saka Satakrni
- Abhira Ishwarsena alias Mahaksatrapa Isvaradatta
- Abhira Vashishthiputra Vasusena

=== Principality of Khoh (c. 221–1028 CE) ===
Prince of Khoh

=== Second Magadha Empire (c. 240 – 750 CE) ===
List of Gupta emperors

Later Gupta rulers

=== Vakataka dynasty (c. 250–500 CE) ===
Vakataka family tree

=== Aulikara Kingdom of Malwa (c. 300 – 550 CE) ===
List of monarchs of Malwa (Aulikara dynasty)

=== Kingdom of Kamarupa (c. 350–650 CE) ===
Kings of Kamarupa

=== Western Ganga of Talakad (c. 350–1424 CE) ===
Rulers of Talakad

=== Eastern Ganga of Kalinga (c. 493-1947 CE) ===
Eastern Ganga of Kalinga

==== Other minor Ganga states ====
===== Principality of Gudari Kataka =====
According to Gangavansucharitam written in sixteenth or seventeenth century, Bhanu Deva IV also known as Kajjala Bhanu founded a new small princedom in southern Odisha at Gudari in modern Rayagada district after he was toppled from power by his general Kapilendra Deva.

- Kajjala Bhanu (or Bhanu Deva IV)
- Svarna Bhanu
- Kalasandha Deva
- Chudanga Deva
- Harimani Deva
- Narasimha Deva
- Ananta Deva
- Padmanabha Deva
- Pitambara Deva
- Vasudeva
- Purrushottama Anangabhima Deva (or Bhima Deva)

===== Principality of Chikiti (c. 881–1950 CE) =====
Prince of Chikiti

===== Parlakhemundi Estate#Rulers (c. 1309–1950) =====
Zamindars of Parlakhemundi

=== Traikutaka dynasty of Aparanta (c. 370–520 CE) ===
Rulers of Aparanta

=== Maitraka dynasty of Vallabhi (c. 475–776 CE) ===
Kings of Vallabhi

=== Rai Kingdom of Sindh (c. 489–632 CE) ===
Kings of Sindh (Rai)

=== Kabul Shahi Kingdom (c. 500–1026 CE) ===
In Kabul Shahi Kingdom two Hindu dynasties ruled:

- Turk Shahi (c. 500–850 CE)
- Hindu Shahi (c. 850–1026 CE)

=== Pushyabhuti/Vardhan dynasty (c. 500 – 647 CE) ===
List of Vardhan kings

=== Jaintia Kingdom (c. 525–1835 CE) ===
Rulers of Jantia

== Early Medieval Period (c. 550s CE – c. 1200s CE) ==
=== Gauda Kingdom (c. 590 – 626 CE) ===
- Shashanka (590–625 CE), first recorded independent king of Bengal, created the first unified political entity in Bengal
- Manava (625–626 CE), ruled for 8 months before being conquered by Harshavardhana and Bhaskarvarman

=== Pala dynasty of Bengal (c. 750 – 1174 CE) ===
Most of the Pala inscriptions mention only the regnal year as the date of issue, without any well-known calendar era. Because of this, the chronology of the Pala kings is hard to determine. Based on their different interpretations of the various epigraphs and historical records, different historians estimate the Pala chronology as follows:

	RC Majumdar (1971)	AM Chowdhury (1967)	BP Sinha (1977)	DC Sircar (1975–76)	D. K. Ganguly (1994)
Gopala I	750–770	756–781	755–783	750–775	750–774
Dharmapala	770–810	781–821	783–820	775–812	774–806
Devapala	810–c. 850	821–861	820–860	812–850	806–845
Mahendrapala	NA (Mahendrapala's existence was conclusively established through a copper-plate charter discovered later.)				845–860
Shurapala I	Deemed to be alternate name of Vigrahapala I			850–858	860–872
Gopala II	NA (copper-plate charter discovered in 1995. Text of inscription published in 2009.)				
Vigrahapala I	850–853	861–866	860–865	858–60	872–873
Narayanapala	854–908	866–920	865–920	860–917	873–927
Rajyapala	908–940	920–952	920–952	917–952	927–959
Gopala III	940–957	952–969	952–967	952–972	959–976
Vigrahapala II	960–c. 986	969–995	967–980	972–977	976–977
Mahipala I	988–c. 1036	995–1043	980–1035	977–1027	977–1027
Nayapala	1038–1053	1043–1058	1035–1050	1027–1043	1027–1043
Vigrahapala III	1054–1072	1058–1075	1050–1076	1043–1070	1043–1070
Mahipala II	1072–1075	1075–1080	1076–1078/9	1070–1071	1070–1071
Shurapala II	1075–1077	1080–1082	1076–1078/9	1071–1072	1071–1072
Ramapala	1077–1130	1082–1124	1078/9–1132	1072–1126	1072–1126
Kumarapala	1130–1140	1124–1129	1132–1136	1126–1128	1126–1128
Gopala IV	1140–1144	1129–1143	1136–1144	1128–1143	1128–1143
Madanapala	1144–1162	1143–1162	1144–1161/62	1143–1161	1143–1161
Govindapala	1158–1162	NA	1162–1176 or 1158–1162	1161–1165	1161–1165
Palapala	NA	NA	NA	1165–1199	1165–1200

Note:

- Earlier historians believed that Vigrahapala I and Shurapala I were the two names of the same person. Now, it is known that these two were cousins; they either ruled simultaneously (perhaps over different territories) or in rapid succession.
- AM Chowdhury rejects Govindapala and his successor Palapala as the members of the imperial Pala dynasty.
- According to BP Sinha, the Gaya inscription can be read as either the "14th year of Govindapala's reign" or "14th year after Govindapala's reign". Thus, two sets of dates are possible.

=== Kalachuri dynasties (c. 550 – 1225 CE) ===
==== Kingdom of Malwa (Early Kalachuris) (c. 550 – 625 CE) ====
Kings of Malwa (Kalachuri)

==== Kalachuri dynasty of Tripuri/Chedi (Later Kalachuris) (c. 675 – 1212 CE) ====
Rulers-

- Vamaraja-deva (675–700 CE), founder of dynasty
- Shankaragana I (750–775 CE)
- Lakshmana-raja I (825–850 CE)
- Kokalla I (850–890 CE); his younger son established the Ratnapura Kalachuri branch
- Shankaragana II (890–910 CE), alias Mugdhatunga
- Balaharsha (910–915 CE)
- Yuvaraja-deva I (915–945 CE)
- Lakshmana-raja II (945–970 CE)
- Shankaragana III (970–980 CE)
- Yuvaraja-deva II (980–990 CE)
- Kokalla II (990–1015 CE)
- Gangeya-deva (1015–1041 CE)
- Lakshmi-karna (1041–1073 CE), alias Karna
- Yashah-karna (1073–1123 CE)
- Gaya-karna (1123–1153 CE)
- Nara-simha (1153–1163 CE)
- Jaya-simha (1163–1188 CE)
- Vijaya-simha (1188–1210 CE)
- Trailokya-malla (c. 1210– at least 1212 CE), last ruler

==== Kalachuri dynasty of Ratnapura (c. 1000 – 1225 CE) ====
The following is a list of the Ratnapura Kalachuri rulers, with estimated period of their reigns:

- Kalinga-raja (1000–1020 CE), founder of dynasty
- Kamala-raja (1020–1045 CE)
- Ratna-raja (1045–1065 CE), alias Ratna-deva I
- Prithvi-deva I (1065–1090 CE), alias Prithvisha
- Jajalla-deva I (1090–1120 CE) (declared independence)
- Ratna-Deva II (1120–1135 CE)
- Prithvi-deva II (1135–1165 CE)
- Jajalla-deva II (1165–1168 CE)
- Jagad-deva (1168–1178 CE)
- Ratna-deva III (1178–1200 CE)
- Pratapa-malla (1200–1225 CE)
- Parmardi Dev (governor of Eastern Gangas)

==== Kalachuri dynasty of Kalyani (Southern Kalachuris) (c. 1130 – 1184 CE) ====
Rulers-

- Bijjala II (1130–1167), proclaimed independence from Kalyani Chalukyas in 1162 CE
- Sovideva (1168–1176)
- Mallugi, overthrown by his brother Sankama
- Sankama (1176–1180)
- Ahavamalla (1180–83)
- Singhana (1183–84), last ruler

=== Patola/Gilgit Shahi dynasty (c. 550 – 750 CE) ===
Regin of known rulers is disputed-

- Somana (Mid 6th century CE)
- Vajraditayanandin (585–605 CE)
- Vikramadityanandin (605–625 CE)
- Surendravikramadityanandin (625–644 or 654 CE)
- Navasurendrāditya-nandin (644 or 654–685 CE)
- Jayamaṅgalavikramāditya-nandin (685–710 CE)
- Nandivikramadityanandin (710–715 CE)
- Su-fu-che-li-chi-li-ni (name by foreign sources) (715–720 CE)
- Surendradityanandin (720–740 or 750 CE), last known ruler

=== Gurjara-Pratihara Empire (c. 550 – 1036 CE) ===
==== Pratiharas of Mandavyapura (Mandor) (c. 550 – 860 CE) ====
R. C. Majumdar, on the other hand, assumed a period of 25 years for each generation, and placed him in c. 550 CE. The following is a list of the dynasty's rulers (IAST names in brackets) and estimates of their reigns, assuming a period of 25 years.

- Harichandra (Haricandra) alias Rohilladhi (r. c. 550 CE), founder of dynasty
- Rajilla (r. c. 575 CE)
- Narabhatta (Narabhaṭa) alias Pellapelli (r. c. 600 CE)
- Nagabhata (Nāgabhaṭa) alias Nahada (r. c. 625 CE)
- Tata (Tāta) and Bhoja (r. c. 650 CE)
- Yashovardhana (Yaśovardhana) (r. c. 675 CE)
- Chanduka (Canduka) (r. c. 700 CE)
- Shiluka (Śīluka) alias Silluka (r. c. 725 CE)
- Jhota (r. c. 750 CE)
- Bhilladitya alias Bhilluka (r. c. 775 CE)
- Kakka (r. c. 800 CE)
- Bauka (Bāuka) (r. c. 825 CE)
- Kakkuka (r. c. 861 CE), last ruler

==== Imperial Pratiharas of Kannauj (c. 730 – 1036 CE) ====
List of rulers–

List of Imperial Gurjara-Pratihara dynasty rulers
Serial No.	Ruler	Reign (CE)
1	Nagabhata I	730–760
2	Kakustha and Devaraja	760–780
3	Vatsaraja	780–800
4	Nagabhata II	800–833
5	Ramabhadra	833–836
6	Mihira Bhoja or Bhoja I	836–885
7	Mahendrapala I	885–910
8	Bhoja II	910–913
9	Mahipala I	913–944
10	Mahendrapala II	944–948
11	Devapala	948–954
12	Vinayakapala	954–955
13	Mahipala II	955–956
14	Vijayapala II	956–960
15	Rajapala	960–1018
16	Trilochanapala	1018–1027
17	Yasahpala	1024–1036

==== Other Pratihara Branches ====
Baddoch Branch (c. 600 – 700 CE)

Known Baddoch rulers are-

- Dhaddha 1 (600–627)
- Dhaddha 2 (627–655)
- Jaibhatta (655–700)

Rajogarh Branch

Badegujar were rulers of Rajogarh

- Parmeshver Manthandev, (885–915)
- No records found after Parmeshver Manthandev

=== Chahamana (Chauhan) dynasties (c. 551 – 1315 CE) ===
The ruling dynasties belonging to the Chauhan clan included–

- Chahamanas of Shakambhari (Chauhans of Ajmer) (c. 551 – 1194 CE)
- Chahamanas of Naddula (Chauhans of Nadol) (c. 950 – 1197 CE)
- Chahamanas of Jalor (c. 1160 – 1311 CE), branched off from the Chahamanas of Naddula
- Chahamanas of Ranastambhapura (c. 1192 – 1301 CE), branched off from the Chahamanas of Shakambhari
- Chahamanas of Chandravati and Abu (Kingdom of Sirohi) (c. 1311 – 1949 CE)
- Chahamanas of Lata
- Chahamanas of Dholpur
- Chahamanas of Partabgarh
- Hada Chauhan kingdoms of Hadoti region are–
  - Kingdom of Bundi (c. 1342 – 1949 CE)
  - Kingdom of Kota (c. 1579 – 1948 CE)
  - Kingdom of Jhalawar (c. 1838 – 1949 CE), branched off from the Kingdom of Kota in 1838 CE.

==== Chahamanas of Sambhar Ajmer and Delhi (c. 551 – 1194 CE) ====
Following is a list of Chahamana rulers of Shakambhari, Ajmer and Delhi with approximate period of reign, as estimated historian by R. B. Singh:

Serial no.	Regnal names	Reign (CE)
1	Chahamana	(mythical)
2	Vasudeva	c. 551 CE (disputed)
3	Samanta-raja	684–709
4	Naradeva	709–721
5	Ajayaraja I	721–734
6	Vigraha-raja I	734–759
7	Chandra-raja I	759–771
8	Gopendra-raja	771–784
9	Durlabha-raja I	784–809
10	Govinda-raja I alias Guvaka I	809–836
11	Chandra-raja II	836–863
12	Govindaraja II alias Guvaka II	863–890
13	Chandana-raja	890–917
14	Vakpatiraja I	917–944
15	Simha-raja	944–971
16	Vigraha-raja II	971–998
17	Durlabha-raja II	998–1012
18	Govinda-raja III	1012–1026
19	Vakpati-raja II	1026–1040
20	Viryarama	1040 (few months)
21	Chamunda-raja	1040–1065
22	Durlabha-raja III alias Duśala	1065–1070
23	Vigraha-raja III alias Visala	1070–1090
24	Prithvi-raja I	1090–1110
25	Ajaya-raja II	1110–1135
26	Arno-raja alias Ana	1135–1150
27	Jagad-deva	1150
28	Vigraharaja IV alias Visaladeva	1150–1164
29	Aparagangeya	1164–1165
30	Prithviraja II	1165–1169
31	Someshvara	1169–1178
32	Prithviraja III Rai Pithora	1177–1192
33	Govinda-raja IV	1192–1193
34	Hari-raja	1193–1194

==== Chahamanas of Naddula (c. 950 – 1197 CE) ====
Following is a list of Chahmana rulers of Naddula, with approximate period of reign, as estimated by R. B. Singh:

List of Chauhan rulers of Naddula
Serial no.	Kings	Reign (CE)
1	Lakshmana	950–982
2	Shobhita	982–986
3	Baliraja	986–990
4	Vigrahapala	990–994
5	Mahindra	994–1015
6	Ashvapala	1015–1019
7	Ahila	1019–1024
8	Anahilla	1024–1055
9	Balaprasada	1055–1070
10	Jendraraja	1070–1080
11	Prithvipala	1080–1090
12	Jojalladeva	1090–1110
13	Asharaja	1110–1119
14	Ratnapala	1119–1132
15	Rayapala	1132–1145
16	Katukaraja	1145–1148
17	Alhanadeva	1148–1163
18	Kelhanadeva	1163–1193
19	Jayatasimha	1193–1197

==== Chahamanas of Jalor (c. 1160 – 1311 CE) ====
The Chahamana rulers of the Jalor branch, with their estimated periods of reign, are as follows:

Virama-deva (1311 CE) was last ruler of dynasty, crowned during the Siege of Jalore, but died 2 1/2 days later.

List of Chauhan rulers of Jalor
Serial no.	Kings	Reign (CE)
1	Kirtipala	1160–1182
2	Samarasimha	1182–1204
3	Udayasimha	1204–1257
4	Chachigadeva	1257–1282
5	Samantasimha	1282–1305
6	Kanhadadeva	1292–1311
7	Viramadeva	1311

==== Chahamanas of Ranastambhapura (c. 1192 – 1301 CE) ====
List of Chauhan rulers of Ranastambhapura
Serial no.	Kings	Reign (CE)
1	Govinda-raja	1192
2	Balhanadeva	
3	Prahlada-deva	
4	Viranarayana	
5	Vagabhata	
6	Jaitra-simha	
7	Shakti-deva	
8	Hammira-deva	1283–1311

=== Kingdom of Mewar (c. 566 – 1947 CE) ===
In the 6th century, three different Guhila dynasties are known to have ruled in present-day Rajasthan:

1. Guhilas of Nagda-Ahar– most important branch and future ruling dynasty of Mewar.
2. Guhilas of Kishkindha (modern Kalyanpur)
3. Guhilas of Dhavagarta (modern Dhor)

==== Guhila dynasty (c. 566 – 1303 CE) ====
List of Guhila dynasty rulers
Nu.	King (Rawal)	Reign (CE)
1	Rawal Guhil	566–586
2	Rawal Bhoj	586–606
3	Rawal Mahendra I	606–626
4	Rawal Naga (Nagaditya)	626–646
5	Rawal Shiladitya	646–661
6	Rawal Aprajeet	661–688
7	Rawal Mahendra II	688–716
8	Bappa Rawal	728–753
9	Rawal Khuman I	753–773
10	Rawal Mattat	773–793
11	Rawal Bhartri Bhatt I	793–813
12	Rawal Sinh	813–828
13	Rawal Khuman II	828–853
14	Rawal Mahayak	853–878
15	Rawal Khuman III	878–926
16	Rawal Bhartri Bhatt II	926–951
17	Rawal Allat	951–971
18	Rawal Narwahan	971–973
19	Rawal Saliwahan	973–977
20	Rawal Shakti Kumar	977–993
21	Rawal Amba Prasad	993–1007
22	Rawal Shuchivarma	1007–1021
23	Rawal Narvarma	1021–1035
24	Rawal Keertivarma	1035–1051
25	Rawal Yograj	1051–1068
26	Rawal Vairath	1068–1088
27	Rawal Hanspal	1088–1103
28	Rawal Vair Singh	1103–1107
29	Rawal Vijai Singh	1107–1116
30	Rawal Ari Singh I	1116–1138
31	Rawal Chaudh Singh	1138–1148
32	Rawal Vikram Singh	1148–1158
33	Rawal Ran Singh	1158–1168
Post-split Rawal branch rulers
34	Rawal Khshem Singh	1168–1172
35	Rawal Samant Singh	1172–1179
36	Rawal Kumar Singh	1179–1191
37	Rawal Mathan Singh	1191–1211
38	Rawal Padam Singh	1211–1213
39	Rawal Jaitra Singh	1213–1252
40	Rawal Tej Singh	1252–1273
41	Rawal Samar Singh	1273–1302
42	Rawal Ratan Singh	1302–1303

==== Branching of Guhil dynasty ====
During reign of Rawal Ran Singh (1158–1168), the Guhil dynasty got divided into two branches.

First (Rawal Branch)

Rawal Khshem Singh (1168–1172), son of Ran Singh, ruled over Mewar by building Rawal Branch.

Second (Rana Branch)

Rahapa, the second son of Ran Singh started the Rana Branch by establishing Sisoda bases. Later Hammir Singh of Sisoda base started main Sisodia or Mewar dynasty in 1326 CE.

==== Rana branch rulers (c. 1168 – 1326 CE) ====
"Rahapa", a son of Ranasimha alias Karna, established the Rana branch. According to the 1652 Eklingji inscription, Rahapa's successors were:

List of Rana branch rulers
Nu.	King (Rana)	Reign (CE)
1	Rahapa/Karna	1168 CE
2	Narapati	
3	Dinakara	
4	Jasakarna	
5	Nagapala	
6	Karnapala	
7	Bhuvanasimha	
8	Bhimasimha	
9	Jayasimha	
10	Lakhanasimha	
11	Arisimha	
12	Hammir Singh	1326 CE

==== Sisodia dynasty (c. 1326 – 1947 CE) ====
Picture	King (Maharana)	Reign
	Hammir Singh	1326–1364
	Kshetra Singh	1364–1382
	Lakha Singh	1382–1421
	Mokal Singh	1421–1433
	Rana Kumbha	1433–1468
	Udai Singh I	1468–1473
	Rana Raimal	1473–1508
	Rana Sanga	1508–1527
	Ratan Singh II	1528–1531
	Vikramaditya Singh	1531–1536
	Vanvir Singh	1536–1540
	Udai Singh II	1540–1572
	Maharana Pratap	1572–1597
	Amar Singh I	1597–1620
	Karan Singh II	1620–1628
	Jagat Singh I	1628–1652
	Raj Singh I	1652–1680
	Jai Singh	1680–1698
	Amar Singh II	1698–1710
	Sangram Singh II	1710–173
	Jagat Singh II	1734–1751
	Pratap Singh II	1751–1754
	Raj Singh II	1754–1762
	Ari Singh II	1762–1772
	Hamir Singh II	1772–1778
	Bhim Singh	1778–1828
	Jawan Singh	1828–1838
	Sardar Singh	1838–1842
	Swarup Singh	1842–1861
	Shambhu Singh	1861–1874
	Sajjan Singh	1874–1884
	Fateh Singh	1884–1930
	Bhupal Singh	1930–1948 1948-1955 (titular)
	Titular Maharanas	
	Bhagwat Singh	1955–1984
	Mahendra Singh	1984–2024
	Vishvaraj Singh	2024–present

=== Karkota dynasty of Kashmir (c. 625–855 CE) ===
- Durlabhavardhana (625–662), (founder of the dynasty)
- Durlabhaka or Pratipaditya (662–712)
- Chandrapeeda or Varnaditya (712–720)
- Tarapida or Udayaditya (720–724)
- Lalitaditya Muktapida (724–760), (built the famous Martand Sun Temple in Kashmir)
- Kuvalayaditya (760–761)
- Vajraditya or Bapyayika or Lalitapida (761–768)
- Prithivyapida I (768–772)
- Sangramapida (772–779)
- Jayapida (also Pandit and poet) (779–813)
- Lalitapida (813–825)
- Sangramapida II (825–832)
- Chipyata-Jayapida (832–885), (last ruler of dynasty)

Other puppet rulers under Utpala dynasty are

- Ajitapida
- Anangapida
- Utpalapida
- Sukhavarma

=== Chacha dynasty of Sindh (c. 632–724 CE) ===
The known rulers of the Brahman dynasty are:

- Chach (632–671 CE)
- Chandar (671–679 CE)
- Dahir (679–712 CE)

Under the Umayyad Caliphate

- Dahirsiya (679–709 CE) from Brahmanabad
- Hullishāh (712–724 CE)
- Shishah (until 724 CE)

=== Mlechchha dynasty of Kamarupa (650–900 CE) ===
- Salastamba (650–670), founder of dynasty
- Vijaya alias Vigrahastambha
- Palaka
- Kumara
- Vajradeva
- Harshadeva alias Harshavarman (725–745)
- Balavarman II
- Jivaraja
- Digleswaravarman
- Salambha
- Harjjaravarman (815–832)
- Vanamalavarmadeva (832–855)
- Jayamala alias Virabahu (855–860)
- Balavarman III (860–880)
- Tyagasimha (890–900)

=== Garhwal Kingdom (c. 688–1949 CE) ===
Mola Ram the 18th century painter, poet, historian and diplomat of Garhwal wrote the historical work Garhrajvansh Ka Itihas (History of the Garhwal royal dynasty) which is the only source of information about several Garhwal rulers.

Rulers of Garhwal - Panwar clan of Garhwali Rajputs
No.	Name	Reign	Years Reigned	No.	Name	Reign	Years Reigned	No.	Name	Reign	Years Reigned
1	Kanak Pal	688–699	11	21	Vikram Pal	1116–1131	15	41	Vijay Pal	1426–1437	11
2	Shyam Pal	699–725	26	22	Vichitra Pal	1131–1140	9	42	Sahaj Pal	1437–1473	36
3	Pandu Pal	725–756	31	23	Hans Pal	1141–1152	11	43	Bahadur Shah	1473–1498	25
4	Abhijat Pal	756–780	24	24	Som Pal	1152–1159	7	44	Man Shah	1498–1518	20
5	Saugat Pal	781–800	19	25	Kadil Pal	1159–1164	5	45	Shyam Shah	1518–1527	9
6	Ratna Pal	800–849	49	26	Kamadev Pal	1172–1179	7	46	Mahipat Shah	1527–1552	25
7	Shali Pal	850–857	7	27	Sulakshan Dev	1179–1197	18	47	Prithvi Shah	1552–1614	62
8	Vidhi Pal	858–877	19	28	Lakhan Dev	1197–1220	23	48	Medini Shah	1614–1660	46
9	Madan Pal	877–894	17	29	Anand Pal II	1220–1241	21	49	Fateh Shah	1660–1708	48
10	Bhakti Pal	895–919	24	30	Purva Dev	1241–1260	19	50	Upendra Shah	1708–1709	1
11	Jayachand Pal	920–948	28	31	Abhay Dev	1260–1267	7	51	Pradip Shah	1709–1772	63
12	Prithvi Pal	949–971	22	32	Jayaram Dev	1267–1290	23	52	Lalit Shah	1772–1780	8
13	Medinisen Pal	972–995	23	33	Asal Dev	1290–1299	9	53	Jayakrit Shah	1780–1786	6
14	Agasti Pal	995–1014	19	34	Jagat Pal	1299–1311	12	54	Pradyumna Shah	1786–1804	18
15	Surati Pal	1015–1036	21	35	Jit Pal	1311–1330	19	55	Sudarshan Shah	1804–1859	55
16	Jay Pal	1037–1055	18	36	Anant Pal II	1330–1358	28	56	Bhawani Shah	1859–1871	12
17	Anant Pal I	1056–1072	16	37	Ajay Pal	1358–1389	31	57	Pratap Shah	1871–1886	15
18	Anand Pal I	1072–1083	11	38	Kalyan Shah	1389–1398	9	58	Kirti Shah	1886–1913	27
19	Vibhog Pal	1084–1101	17	39	Sundar Pal	1398–1413	15	59	Narendra Shah	1913–1946	33
20	Suvayanu Pal	1102–1115	13	40	Hansadev Pal	1413–1426	13	60	Manabendra Shah	1946–1949	3

=== Mallabhum (Bishnupur) kingdom (c. 694–1947 CE) ===
Mallabhum kingdom or Bishnupur kingdom was the kingdom ruled by the Malla kings of Bishnupur, primarily in the present Bankura district in Indian state of West Bengal. (also known as Mallabhoom),

Name of the king	Reign
Adi Malla	694–710
Jay Malla	710–720
Benu Malla	720–733
Kinu Malla	733–742
Indra Malla	742–757
Kanu Malla	757–764
Dha (Jhau) Malla	764–775
Shur Malla	775–795
Kanak Malla	795–807
Kandarpa Malla	807–828
Sanatan Malla	828–841
Kharga Malla	841–862
Durjan (Durjay) Malla	862–906
Yadav Malla	906–919
Jagannath Malla	919–931
Birat Malla	931–946
Mahadev Malla	946–977
Durgadas Malla	977–994
Jagat Malla	994–1007
Ananta Malla	1007–1015
Rup Malla	1015–1029
Sundar Malla	1029–1053
Kumud Malla	1053–1074
Krishna Malla	1074–1084
Rup II (Jhap) Malla	1084–1097
Prakash Malla	1097–1102
Pratap Malla	1102–1113
Sindur Malla	1113–1129
Sukhomoy(Shuk) Malla	1129–1142
Banamali Malla	1142–1156
Yadu/Jadu Malla	1156–1167
Jiban Malla	1167–1185
Ram Malla	1185–1209
Gobinda Malla	1209–1240
Bhim Malla	1240–1263
Katar(Khattar) Malla	1263–1295
Prithwi Malla	1295 -1319
Tapa Malla	1319–1334
Dinabandhu Malla	1334–1345
Kinu/Kanu II Malla	1345–1358
Shur Malla II	1358–1370
Shiv Singh Malla	1370–1407
Madan Malla	1407–1420
Durjan II (Durjay) Malla	1420–1437
Uday Malla	1437–1460
Chandra Malla	1460–1501
Bir Malla	1501–1554
Dhari Malla	1554–1565
Hambir Malla Dev (Bir Hambir)	1565–1620
Dhari Hambir Malla Dev	1620–1626
Raghunath Singha Dev	1626–1656
Bir Singha Dev	1656–1682
Durjan Singha Dev	1682–1702
Raghunath Singha Dev II	1702–1712
Gopal Singha Dev	1712–1748
Chaitanya Singha Dev	1748–1801
Madhav Singha Dev	1801–1809
Gopal Singha Dev II	1809–1876
Ramkrishna Singha Dev	1876–1885
Dwhaja Moni Devi	1885–1889
Nilmoni Singha Dev	1889–1903
Churamoni Devi (Regency)	1903–1930
Kalipada Singha Thakur	1930–1947

=== Chand Kingdom of Kumaon (700–1790 CE) ===
Badri Datt Pandey, in his book Kumaun Ka Itihaas lists the Chand kings as following:

King	Reign
Som Chand	700–721
Atm Chand	721–740
Purn Chand	740–758
Indra Chand	758–778
Sansar Chand	778–813
Sudha Chand	813–833
Hamir Chand	833–856
Vina Chand	856–869
Vir Chand	1065–1080
Rup Chand	1080–1093
Laxmi Chand	1093–1113
Dharm Chand	1113–1121
Karm Chand	1121–1140
Ballal Chand	1140–1149
Nami Chand	1149–1170
Nar Chand	1170–1177
Nanaki Chand	1177–1195
Ram Chand	1195–1205
Bhishm Chand	1205–1226
Megh Chand	1226–1233
Dhyan Chand	1233–1251
Parvat Chand	1251–1261
Thor Chand	1261–1275
Kalyan Chand II	1275–1296
Trilok Chand	1296–1303
Damaru Chand	1303–1321
Dharm Chand	1321–1344
Abhay Chand	1344–1374
Garur Gyan Chand	1374–1419
Harihar Chand	1419–1420
Udyan Chand	1420–1421
Atma Chand II	1421–1422
Hari Chand II	1422–1423
Vikram Chand	1423–1437
Bharati Chand	1437–1450
Ratna Chand	1450–1488
Kirti Chand	1488–1503
Pratap Chand	1503–1517
Tara Chand	1517–1533
Manik Chand	1533–1542
Kalyan Chand III	1542–1551
Purna Chand	1551–1555
Bhishm Chand	1555–1560
Balo Kalyan Chand	1560–1568
Rudra Chand	1568–1597
Laxmi Chand	1597–1621
Dilip Chand	1621–1624
Vijay Chand	1624–1625
Trimal Chand	1625–1638
Baz Bahadur Chand	1638–1678
Udyot Chand	1678–1698
Gyan Chand	1698–1708
Jagat Chand	1708–1720
Devi Chand	1720–1726
Ajit Chand	1726–1729
Kalyan Chand V	1729–1747
Deep Chand	1747–1777
Mohan Chand	1777–1779
Pradyumn Chand	1779–1786
Mohan Chand	1786–1788
Shiv Chand	1788
Mahendra Chand	1788–1790

=== Karttikeyapur (Katyur) Kingdom (700–1065 CE) ===
The period of certain Katyuri rulers, is generally determined as below, although there is some ambiguity in respect to exact number of years ruled by each King

List–

- Vasu Dev (700–849 CE)
- Basantana Dev (850–870 CE)
- Kharpar Dev (870–880 CE)
- Abhiraj Dev (880–890 CE)
- Tribhuvanraj Dev (890–900 CE)
- Nimbarta Dev (900–915 CE)
- Istanga (915–930 CE)
- Lalitasura Dev (930–955 CE)
- Bhu Dev (955–970 CE)
- Salonaditya (970–985 CE)
- Ichchhata Dev (985–1000 CE)
- Deshat Dev (1000–1015 CE)
- Padmata Dev (1015–1045 CE)
- Subhiksharaja Dev (1045–1060 CE)
- Dham Dev (1060–1064 CE)
- Bir Dev (Very short period until 1065 CE)

=== Varman dynasty of Kannauj (c. 725–770 CE) ===
- Yashovarman (c. 725–752 CE), founder of dynasty
- Āma
- Dunduka
- Bhoja (ruled until 770 CE), last ruler of dynasty.

=== Rashtrakuta Empire (c. 753–982 CE) ===
Serial no.	Regnal names	Reign	Notes
1	Dantidurga	753–756 CE	Founder of the empire.
2	Krishna I	756–774 CE	
3	Govinda II	774–780 CE	
4	Dhruva Dharavarsha	780–793 CE	
5	Govinda III	793–814 CE	
6	Amoghavarsha	814–878 CE	Longest reigning monarch and founded of Manyakheta city, which became the capital of the dynasty.
7	Krishna II	878–914 CE	
8	Indra III	914–929 CE	
9	Amoghavarsha II	929–932 CE	
10	Govinda IV	930–935 CE	
11	Amoghavarsha III	934–939 CE	
12	Krishna III	939–967 CE	
13	Khottiga Amoghavarsha	967–972 C	
14	Karka II or Amoghhavarsha IV	972–973 CE	
15	Indra IV (only a claimer for the lost throne.)	973–982 CE	He was the only a claimer for the lost throne.

=== Tomar dynasty of Delhi (c. 736–1151 CE) ===
Various historical texts provide different lists of the Tomara kings:

- Khadag Rai's history of Gwalior (Gopācala ākhyāna) names 18 Tomara kings, plus Prithvi Pala (who is probably the Chahamana king Prithviraja III). According to Khadag Rai, Delhi was originally ruled by the legendary king Vikramaditya. It was deserted for 792 years after his death, until Bilan Dev [Veer Mahadev or Birmaha] of Tomara dynasty re-established the city (in 736 CE).
- The Kumaon-Garhwal manuscript names only 15 rulers of "Toar" dynasty, and dates the beginning of their rule to 789 CE (846 Vikram Samvat).
- Abul Fazl's Ain-i-Akbari (Bikaner manuscript, edited by Syed Ahmad Khan) names 19 Tomara kings. It places the first Tomara king in 372 CE (429 Vikram Samvat). It might be possible that the era mentioned in the original source used by Abul Fazl was Gupta era, which starts from 318 to 319 CE; Abul Fazl might have mistaken this era to be Vikrama Samvat. If this is true, then the first Tomara king can be dated to 747 CE (429+318), which is better aligned with the other sources.

As stated earlier, the historians doubt the claim that the Tomaras established Delhi in 736 CE.

List of Tomara rulers according to various sources
#	Abul Fazl's Ain-i-Akbari / Bikaner manuscript	Gwalior manuscript of Khadag Rai	Kumaon-Garhwal manuscript	Ascension year in CE (according to Gwalior manuscript)	Length of reign		
#	Abul Fazl's Ain-i-Akbari / Bikaner manuscript	Gwalior manuscript of Khadag Rai	Kumaon-Garhwal manuscript	Ascension year in CE (according to Gwalior manuscript)	Years	Months	Days
1	Ananga Pāla	Bilan Dev		736	18	0	0
2	Vasu Deva			754	19	1	18
3	Gangya	Ganggeva		773	21	3	28
4	Prithivi Pāla (or Prithivi Malla)	Prathama	Mahi Pāla	794	19	6	19
5	Jaya Deva	Saha Deva	Jadu Pāla	814	20	7	28
6	Nīra Pāla or Hira Pāla	Indrajita (I)	Nai Pāla	834	14	4	9
7	Udiraj (or Adereh)	Nara Pāla	Jaya Deva Pāla	849	26	7	11
8	Vijaya (or Vacha)	Indrajita (II)	Chamra Pāla	875	21	2	13
9	Biksha (or Anek)	Vacha Raja	Bibasa Pāla	897	22	3	16
10	Rīksha Pāla	Vira Pāla	Sukla Pāla	919	21	6	5
11	Sukh Pāla (or Nek Pāla)	Go-Pāla	Teja Pāla	940	20	4	4
12	Go-Pāla	Tillan Dev	Mahi Pāla	961	18	3	15
13	Sallakshana Pāla	Suvari	Sursen	979	25	10	10
14	Jaya Pāla	Osa Pāla	Jaik Pāla	1005	16	4	3
15	Kunwar Pāla	Kumara Pāla		1021	29	9	18
16	Ananga Pāla (or Anek Pāla)	Ananga Pāla	Anek Pāla	1051	29	6	18
17	Vijaya Pāla (or Vijaya Sah)	Teja Pāla	Teja Pāla	1081	24	1	6
18	Mahi Pāla (or Mahatsal)	Mahi Pāla	Jyūn Pāla	1105	25	2	23
19	Akr Pāla (or Akhsal)	Mukund Pāla	Ane Pāla	1130	21	2	15
	Prithivi Raja (Chahamana)	Prithvi Pala		1151			

Another resource tells that the son of King Mukundpal Tomar, King Prithvipal Tomar had a son named King Govind Raj Tomar ruled for 1189 to 1192 .

=== Shilahara dynasty (765–1265 CE) ===
Shilahara Kingdom was split into three branches:

- First branch ruled North Konkan
- Second branch ruled South Konkan (between 765 and 1029 CE)
- Third branch ruled in modern districts of Kolhapur, Satara and Belgaum (between 940 and 1215 CE) after which they were overwhelmed by the Yadavas.

==== South Konkan branch (c. 765–1020 CE) ====
List of rulers–

1. Sanaphulla (765–795 CE)
2. Dhammayira (795–820 CE)
3. Aiyaparaja (820–845 CE)
4. Avasara I (845–870 CE)
5. Adityavarma (870–895 CE)
6. Avasara II (895–920 CE)
7. Indraraja (920–945 CE)
8. Bhima (945–970 CE)
9. Avasara III (970–995 CE)
10. Rattaraja (995–1020 CE)

==== North Konkan (Thane) branch (c. 800–1265 CE) ====
List of rulers–

1. Kapardin I (800–825 CE)
2. Pullashakti (825–850 CE)
3. Kapardin II (850–880 CE)
4. Vappuvanna (880–910 CE)
5. Jhanjha (910–930 CE)
6. Goggiraja (930–945 CE)
7. Vajjada I (945–965 CE)
8. Chhadvaideva (965–975 CE)
9. Aparajita (975–1010 CE)
10. Vajjada II (1010–1015 CE)
11. Arikesarin (1015–1022 CE)
12. Chhittaraja (1022–1035 CE)
13. Nagarjuna (1035–1045 CE)
14. Mummuniraja (1045–1070 CE)
15. Ananta Deva I (1070–1127 CE)
16. Aparaditya I (1127–1148 CE)
17. Haripaladeva (1148–1155 CE)
18. Mallikarjuna (1155–1170 CE)
19. Aparaditya II (1170–1197 CE)
20. Ananta Deva II (1198–1200 CE)
21. Keshideva II (1200–1245 CE)
22. Ananta Deva III (1245–1255 CE)
23. Someshvara (1255–1265 CE), last ruler of dynasty

==== Kolhapur branch (c. 940–1212 CE) ====
List of rulers–

1. Jatiga I (940–960 CE)
2. Naivarman (960–980 CE)
3. Chandra (980–1000 CE)
4. Jatiga II (1000–1020 CE)
5. Gonka (1020–1050 CE)
6. Guhala I (1050 CE)
7. Kirtiraja (1050 CE)
8. Chandraditya (1050 CE)
9. Marsimha (1050–1075 CE)
10. Guhala II (1075–1085 CE)
11. Bhoja I (1085–1100 CE)
12. Ballala (1100–1108 CE)
13. Gonka II (1108 CE)
14. Gandaraditya I (1108–1138 CE)
15. Vijayaditya I (1138–1175 CE)
16. Bhoja II (1175–1212 CE)

=== Ayudha dynasty of Kannauj (c. 770–810 CE) ===
- Vajrayudha (770–783), founder of dynasty
- Indrayudha
- Chakrayudha (until 810)

=== Chandela dynasty of Jejakabhukti (c. 831–1315 CE) ===
The Chandelas of Jejakabhukti were a dynasty in Central India. They ruled much of the Bundelkhand region (then called Jejakabhukti) between the 9th and the 13th centuries.

Based on epigraphic records, the historians have come up with the following list of Chandela rulers of Jejākabhukti (IAST names in brackets):

- Nannuka, (c. 831-845 CE)
- Vakpati (Vākpati), (c. 845-865 CE)
- Jayashakti (Jayaśakti) and Vijayashakti (Vijayaśakti), (c. 865-885 CE)
- Rahila (Rāhila), (c. 885-905 CE)
- Shri Harsha (Śri Harśa), (c. 905-925 CE)
- Yasho-Varman (Yaśovarman), (c. 925-950 CE)
- Dhanga-Deva (Dhaṅgadeva), (c. 950-999 CE)
- Ganda-Deva (Gaṇḍadeva), (c. 999-1002 CE)
- Vidyadhara (Vidyādhara), (c. 1003-1035 CE)
- Vijaya-Pala (Vijayapāla), (c. 1035-1050 CE)
- Deva-Varman, (c. 1050-1060 CE)
- Kirtti-Varman (Kīrtivarman), (c. 1060-1100 CE)
- Sallakshana-Varman (Sallakṣaṇavarman), (c. 1100-1110 CE)
- Jaya-Varman, (c. 1110-1120 CE)
- Prithvi-Varman (Pṛthvīvarman), (c. 1120-1128 CE)
- Madana-Varman, (c. 1128-1165 CE)
- Yasho-Varman II (c. 1164-65 CE); did not rule or ruled for a very short time
- Paramardi-Deva, (c. 1165-1203 CE)
- Trailokya-Varman, (c. 1203-1245 CE)
- Vira-Varman (Vīravarman), (c. 1245-1285 CE)
- Bhoja-Varman, (c. 1285-1288 CE)
- Hammira-Varman (Hammīravarman), (c. 1288-1311 CE)
- Vira-Varman II (c. 1311–1315 CE) (an obscure ruler with low titles, attested by only one 1315 CE inscription)

=== Seuna (Yadava) dynasty of Devagiri (c. 850–1334 CE) ===
- Dridhaprahara
- Seunachandra (850–874)
- Dhadiyappa (874–900)
- Bhillama I (900–925)
- Vadugi (Vaddiga) (950–974)
- Dhadiyappa II (974–975)
- Bhillama II (975–1005)
- Vesugi I (1005–1020)
- Bhillama III (1020–1055)
- Vesugi II (1055–1068)
- Bhillama III (1068)
- Seunachandra II (1068–1085)
- Airamadeva (1085–1115)
- Singhana I (1115–1145)
- Mallugi I (1145–1150)
- Amaragangeyya (1150–1160)
- Govindaraja (1160)
- Amara Mallugi II (1160–1165)
- Kaliya Ballala (1165–1173)
- Bhillama V (1173–1192), proclaimed independence from Kalyani Chalukya
- Jaitugi I (1192–1200)
- Singhana II (1200–1247)
- Kannara (1247–1261)
- Mahadeva (1261–1271)
- Amana (1271)
- Ramachandra (1271–1312)
- Singhana III (1312–1313)
- Harapaladeva (1313–1318)
- Mallugi III (1318–1334)

=== Paramara dynasty of Malwa (c. 9th century to 1305 CE) ===
According to historical 'Kailash Chand Jain', "Knowledge of the early Paramara rulers from Upendra to Vairisimha is scanty; there are no records, and they are known only from later sources." The Paramara rulers mentioned in the various inscriptions and literary sources include:

List of Paramara dynasty rulers
Serial No.	Ruler	Reign (CE)
1	King Paramar	(Legendary)
2	Upendra Krishnraja	early 9th century
3	Vairisimha (I)	early 9th century
4	Siyaka (I)	mid of 9th century
5	Vakpatiraj (I)	late 9th to early 10th century
6	Vairisimha (II)	mid of 10th century
7	Siyaka (II)	940–972
8	Vakpatiraj (II) alias Munja	972–990
9	Sindhuraja	990–1010
10	Bhoja	1010–1055
11	JayasimhaI	1055–1070
12	Udayaditya	1070–1086
13	Lakshmadeva	1086–1094
14	Naravarman	1094–1133
15	Yashovarman	1133–1142
16	Jayavarman I	1142–1143
17	Interregnum from (1143 to 1175 CE) under an usurper named 'Ballala' and later the Solanki king Kumarapala	1143–1175
18	Vindhyavarman	1175–1194
19	Subhatavarman	1194–1209
20	Arjunavarman I	1210–1215
21	Devapala	1215/1218–1239
22	Jaitugideva	1239–1255
23	Jayavarman II	1255–1274
24	Arjunavarman II	1274–1285
25	Bhoja II	1285–1301
26	Mahalakadeva	1301–1305

After death of Mahalakadeva in 1305 CE, Paramara dynasty rule was ended in Malwa region, but not in other Parmar states.

=== Utpala dynasty of Kashmir (c. 855 – 1009 CE) ===
Ruler	Reign
Avantivarman	853/855 – 883 CE
Shankaravarman	883 – 902 CE
Gopalavarman	902 – 904 CE
Sankata	904 CE
Sugandha	904 – 906 CE
Partha	906 – 921 CE
Nirjitavarman	921 – 922 CE
Chakravarman	922 – 933 CE
Shuravarman I	933 – 934 CE
Partha (2nd reign)	934 – 935 CE
Chakravarman (2nd reign)	935 CE
Shankaravardhana (or Shambhuvardhana)	935 – 936 CE
Chakravarman (3rd reign)	936 – 937 CE
Unmattavanti ("Mad Avanti")	937 – 939 CE
Shuravarman II	939 CE
Yashaskara-deva	939 CE
Varnata	948 CE
Sangramadeva (Sanggrama I)	948 CE
Parvagupta	948 – 950 CE
Kshemagupta	950 – 958 CE
Abhimanyu II	958 – 972 CE
Nandigupta	972 – 973 CE
Tribhuvanagupta	973 – 975 CE
Bhimagupta	975 – 980 CE
Didda	980 to 1009/1012 CE

Didda (c. 980 – 1003 CE) placed Samgrāmarāja, son of her brother on the throne, who became founder of the Lohara dynasty.

=== Somavamshi dynasty (c. 882 – 1110 CE) ===
Historian Krishna Chandra Panigrahi provides the following chronology of the later Somavamshis:

Name (IAST)	Regnal name (IAST)	Reign
Janmejaya I	Mahābhavagupta I	c. 882–922
Yayāti I	Mahāśivagupta I (Mahashivagupta)	c. 922–955
Bhīmaratha	Mahābhavagupta II	c. 955–980
Dharmaratha	Mahāśivagupta II	c. 980–1005
Nahuṣa (Nahusha)	Mahābhavagupta III	c. 1005–1021
Yayāti II	Candihara (Chandihara) Mahāśivagupta III	c. 1025–1040
Uddyotakeśarī (Uddyotakeshari)	Mahābhavagupta IV	c. 1040–1065
Janmejaya II	Mahāśivagupta IV	c. 1065–1085
Purañjaya	Mahābhavagupta V	c. 1085–1110
Karṇadeva	Mahāśivagupta V	c. 1100–1110

=== Pala dynasty of Kamarupa (c. 900 – 1100 CE) ===
S.nu	King	Reign (CE)
1	Brahma Pala	900–920
2	Ratna Pala	920–960
3	Indra Pala	960–990
4	Go Pala aka Gopalavarman	990–1015
5	Harsha Pala	1015–1035
6	Dharma Pala	1035–1060
7	Jaya Pala	1075–1100

=== Paramara dynasty of Chandravati (Abu) (c. 910 – 1220 CE) ===
The following is a list of Paramara rulers of Chandravati, with approximate regnal years, as estimated by epigraphist H. V. Trivedi. The rulers are sons of their predecessors unless noted otherwise:

Regional Name	IAST Name	Reign (CE)
Utpala-raja	Utpalarāja	c. 910–930
Arnno-raja, or Aranya-raja	Arṇṇorāja, or Araṇyarāja	c. 930–950
Krishna-raja	Kṛṣṇarāja	c. 950–979
Dhara-varaha or Dharani-varaha	Dhāravarāha or Dharaṇīvarāha	c. 970–990
Dhurbhata	Dhūrbhaṭa	c. 990–1000
Mahi-pala	Mahīpāla	c. 1000–1020
Dhandhuka	Dhaṃdhuka	c. 1020–1040
Punya-pala or Purna-pala	Puṇyapāla or Pūrṇapāla	c. 1040–1050
Danti-varmman	Daṃtivarmman	c. 1050–1060
Krishna-deva, or Krishna-raja II	Kṛṣṇadeva, or Kṛṣṇarāja II	c. 1060–1090
Kakkala-deva, or Kakala-deva	Kakkaladeva, or Kākaladeva	c. 1090–1115
Vikrama-simha	Vikramāsiṃha	c. 1115–1145
Yasho-dhavala	Yaśodhavala	c. 1145–1160
Rana-simha	Raṇāsiṃha	?
Dhara-varsha	Dhāravarṣa	c. 1160–1220

=== Kingdom of Ladakh (c. 930 – 1842 CE) ===
==== Maryul dynasty of Ngari (c. 930 – 1460 CE) ====
Known Maryul rulers are-

- Lhachen Palgyigon (c. 930 CE)
- Lhachen Utpala (c. 1110 CE)

==== Namgyal dynasty (Gyalpo of Ladakh) (c. 1460 – 1842 CE) ====
The kings of the Namgyal dynasty along with their periods of reign are as follows:

- Lhachen Bhagan (c. 1460–1485)
- Unknown ruler (c. 1485–1510)
- Lata Jughdan (c. 1510–1535)
- Kunga Namgyal I (c. 1535–1555)
- Tashi Namgyal (c. 1555–1575)
- Tsewang Namgyal I (c. 1575–1595)
- Namgyal Gonpo (c.1595–1600)
- Jamyang Namgyal (c. 1595–1616)
- Sengge Namgyal (first rule, c. 1616–1623)
- Norbu Namgyal (c. 1623–1624)
- Sengge Namgyal (second rule, c. 1624–1642)
- Deldan Namgyal (c. 1642–1694)
- Delek Namgyal (c. 1680–1691)
- Nyima Namgyal (c. 1694–1729)
- Deskyong Namgyal (c. 1729–1739)
- Phuntsog Namgyal (c. 1739–1753)
- Tsewang Namgyal II (c. 1753–1782)
- Tseten Namgyal (c. 1782–1802)
- Tsepal Dondup Namgyal (c. 1802–1837, 1839–1840)
- Kunga Namgyal II (c. 1840–1842)

Later Ladakh was conquered by Sikh Empire in 1842 CE.

=== Solanki dynasty (Chaulukyas of Gujarat) (c. 940–1244 CE) ===
The Chalukya rulers of Gujarat, with approximate dates of reign, are as follows:

- Mularaja (c. 940 – c. 995)
- Chamundaraja (c. 996 – c. 1008)
- Vallabharaja (c. 1008)
- Durlabharaja (c. 1008 – c. 1022)
- Bhima I (c. 1022 – c. 1064)
- Karna (c. 1064 – c. 1092)
- Jayasimha Siddharaja (c. 1092 – c. 1142)
- Kumarapala (c. 1142 – c. 1171)
- Ajayapala (c. 1171 – c. 1175)
- Mularaja II (c. 1175 – c. 1178)
- Bhima II (c. 1178 – c. 1240)
- Tribhuvanapala (c. 1240 – c. 1244)

=== Kachchhapaghata dynasty (c. 950–1150 CE) ===
==== Simhapaniya (Sihoniya) and Gopadri (Gwalior) branch ====
- Lakshmana (r. c. 950–975), first ruler of dynasty
- Vajradaman (r. c. 975–1000)
- Mangalaraja (r. c. 1000–1015)
- Kirtiraja (r. c. 1015–1035)
- Muladeva (r. c. 1035–1055)
- Devapala (r. c. 1055–1085)
- Padmapala (r. c. 1085–1090)
- Mahipala (r. c. 1090–1105)
- Ratnapala (r. c. 1105–1130)
- Ajayapala (r. c. 1192–1194)
- Sulakshanapala (r. c. 1196)

==== Dubkund (Dobha) branch ====
- Yuvaraja (r. c. 1000)
- Arjuna (r. c. 1015–1035)
- Abhimanyu (r. c. 1035–1045)
- Vijayapala (r. c. 1045–1070)
- Vikramasimha (r. c. 1070–1100)

==== Nalapura (Narwar) branch ====
- Gaganasimha (r. c. 1075–1090)
- Sharadasimha (r. c. 1090–1105)
- Virasimha (r. c. 1105–1125)
- Tejaskarana (r. c. 1125–1150), last ruler of dynasty

=== Kachwaha dynasty (c. 966–1949 CE) ===
Kachwahas King Sorha Dev and Dulha Rao defeated Meena of Dhundhar kingdom and established the Kachwaha dynasty, which ruled for more than 1000 years & still ruling in Jaipur district of Rajasthan.

==== Rulers ====
- 27 Dec 966 – 15 Dec 1006 Sorha Dev (d. 1006)
- 15 Dec 1006 – 28 Nov 1036 Dulha Rao (d. 1036)
- 28 Nov 1036 – 20 Apr 1039 Kakil (d. 1039)
- 21 Apr 1039 – 28 Oct 1053 Hanu (d. 1053)
- 28 Oct 1053 – 21 Mar 1070 Janddeo (d. 1070)
- 22 Mar 1070 – 20 May 1094 Pajjun Rai (d. 1094)
- 20 May 1094 – 15 Feb 1146 Malayasi (d. 1146)
- 15 Feb 1146 – 25 Jul 1179 Vijaldeo (d. 1179)
- 25 Jul 1179 – 16 Dec 1216 Rajdeo (d. 1216)
- 16 Dec 1216 – 18 Oct 1276 Kilhan (d. 1276)
- 18 Oct 1276 – 23 Jan 1317 Kuntal (d. 1317)
- 23 Jan 1317 – 6 Nov 1366 Jonsi (d. 1366)
- 6 Nov 1366 – 11 Feb 1388 Udaikarn (d. 1388)
- 11 Feb 1388 – 16 Aug 1428 Narsingh (d. 1428)
- 16 Aug 1428 – 20 Sep 1439 Banbir (d. 1439)
- 20 Sep 1439 – 10 Dec 1467 Udharn (d. 1467)
- 10 Dec 1467 – 17 Jan 1503 Chandrasen (d. 1503)
- 17 Jan 1503 – 4 Nov 1527 Prithviraj Singh I (d. 1527)
- 5 Nov 1527 – 19 Jan 1534 Puranmal (d. 1534)
- 19 Jan 1534 – 22 Jul 1537 Bhim Singh (d. 1537)
- 22 Jul 1537 – 15 May 1548 Ratan Singh (d. 1548)
- 15 May 1548 – 1 June 1548 Askaran (d. 1599)
- 1 Jun 1548 – 27 Jan 1574 Bharmal (d. 1574)
- 27 Jan 1574 – 4 Dec 1589 Bhagwant Das (b. 1527 – d. 1589)
- 4 Dec 1589 – 6 Jul 1614 Man Singh (b. 1550 – d. 1614)
- 6 Jul 1614 – 13 Dec 1621 Bhau Singh (d. 1621)
- 13 Dec 1621 – 28 Aug 1667 Jai Singh I (b. 1611 – d. 1667)
- 10 Sep 1667 – 30 Apr 1688: Ram Singh I (b. 1640 – d. 1688)
- 30 Apr 1688 – 19 Dec 1699: Bishan Singh (b. 1672 – d. 1699)
- 19 Dec 1699 – 21 Sep 1743: Jai Singh II (b. 1688 – d. 1743)
- 1743 – 12 Dec 1750: Ishwari Singh (b. 1721 – d. 1750)
- Dec 1750 – 6 Mar 1768: Madho Singh I (b. 1728 – d. 1768)
- 7 Mar 1768 – 16 Apr 1778: Prithvi Singh II
- 1778 – 1803: Pratap Singh (b. 1764 – d. 1803)
- 1803 – 21 Nov 1818: Jagat Singh II (b. ... – d. 1818)
- 22 Dec 1818 – 25 Apr 1819: Mohan Singh (regent) (b. 1809 – d. ...)
- 25 Apr 1819 – 6 Feb 1835: Jai Singh III (b. 1819 – d. 1835)
- Feb 1835 – 18 Sep 1880: Ram Singh II (b. 1835 – d. 1880)
- 18 Sep 1880 – 7 Sep 1922: Madho Singh II (b. 1861 – d. 1922)
- 7 Sep 1922 – 15 Aug 1947 (subsidiary): Sawai Man Singh II (b. 1912 – d. 1970)
- 15 Aug 1947 – 7 Apr 1949 (independent): Sawai Man Singh II (b. 1912 – d. 1970)

He was the last ruler of Kachawa dynasty, he annexed Jaipur State with Union of India in 1949 CE.

==== Titular rulers ====
- 7 Apr 1949 – 24 Jun 1970: Sawai Man Singh II
- 24 Jun 1970 – 28 Dec 1971: Sawai Bhawani Singh (b. 1931 – d. 2011)

Titles were abolished in 1971 according to the 26th amendment to the Indian Constitution.

- 28 Dec 1971 – 17 Apr 2011: Sawai Bhawani Singh (b. 1931 – d. 2011)
- 17 Apr 2011 – present: Padmanabh Singh (b. 1998)

=== Hoysala Empire (c. 1000–1343 CE) ===
- Nripa Kama (1000–1045)

=== Lohara dynasty of Kashmir (c. 1003–1320 CE) ===
The Lohara dynasty were Hindu rulers of Kashmir from the Khasa tribe, in the northern part of the Indian subcontinent, between 1003 and approximately 1320 CE. The dynasty was founded by the Samgramaraja, the grandson of Khasha chief Simharaja and the nephew of the Utpala dynasty Queen Didda.

==== First Lohara dynasty ====
Ruler	Reign	! Ascension year
Sangramaraja (Samgramaraja / Kshamapati)	25 Years	1003 CE
Hariraja	22 days	1028 CE
Ananta-deva	35 Years	1028 CE
Kalasha (Ranaditya II)	26 Years	1063 CE
Utkarsha	22 days	1089 CE
Harsha	12 Years	died in 1101 CE

==== Second Lohara dynasty ====
- Radda (Shankharaja)
- Salhana
- Sussala
- Bhikshachara
- Sussala (2nd reign)
- Jayasimha (Sinha-deva)

=== Khasa Malla Kingdom (c. 10th to 14th century CE) ===
The list of Khas Malla kings mentioned by Giuseppe Tucci is in the following succession up to Prithvi Malla:

List–

- Nāgarāja, (first known ruler of dynasty)
- Chaap/Cāpa
- Chapilla/Cāpilla
- Krashichalla
- Kradhichalla
- Krachalla Deva (1207–1223 CE)
- Ashoka Challa (1223–1287)
- Jitari Malla
- Ananda Malla
- Ripu Malla (1312–1313)
- Sangrama Malla
- Aditya Malla
- Kalyana Malla
- Pratapa Malla
- Punya Malla
- Prithvi Malla
- Abhaya Malla (14th century), (last ruler of dynasty)

=== Naga dynasty of Kalahandi (1005 – 1947 CE) ===
- Raghunath Sai (1005–1040)
- Pratap Narayan Deo (1040–1072)
- Birabar Deo (1072–1108)
- Jugasai Deo I (1108–1142)
- Udenarayan Deo (1142–1173)
- Harichandra Deo (1173–1201)
- Ramachandra Deo (1201–1234)
- Gopinath Deo (1234–1271)
- Balabhadra Deo (1271–1306
- Raghuraj Deo (1306–1337)
- Rai Singh Deo I (1337–1366)
- Haria Deo (1366–1400)
- Jugasai Deo II (1400–1436)
- Pratap Narayan Deo II (1436–1468)
- Hari Rudra Deo (1468–1496)
- Anku Deo (1496–1528)
- Pratap Deo (1528–1564)
- Raghunath Deo (1564–1594)
- Biswambhar Deo (1594–1627)
- Rai Singh Deo II (1627–1658)
- Dusmant Deo (1658–1693)
- Jugasai Deo III (1693–1721)
- Khadag Rai Deo (1721–1747)
- Rai Singh Deo III (1747–1771)
- Purusottam Deo (1771–1796)
- Jugasai Dei IV (1796–1831)
- Fateh Narayan Deo (1831–1853)
- Udit Pratap Deo I (1853–1881)
- Raghu Keshari De (1894–1897)
- Court of Wards (1897–1917)
- Brajamohan Deo (1917–1939)
- Pratap Keshari Deo (1939–1947)

=== Sena dynasty of Bengal (1070 – 1230 CE) ===
List of Sena dynasty rulers
Serial No.	Ruler	Reign (CE)
1	Hemanta Sen	1070–1096
2	Vijay Sen	1096–1159
3	Ballal Sen	1159–1179
4	Lakshman Sen	1179–1206
5	Vishwarup Sen	1206–1225
6	Keshab Sen	1225–1230

=== Kakatiya dynasty (1083–1323) ===
- Beta I (1000–1030)
- Prola I (1030–1075)
- Beta II (1075–1110)
- Prola II (1110–1158)
- Prataparudra I/Rudradeva I (1158–1195).[First independent ruler of this dynasty]
- Mahadeva (1195–1198).[Brother of King Rudradeva]
- Ganapati deva (1199–1261)[He changed capital from Hanumakonda to Orugallu(present day warangal)]
- Rudrama Devi (1262–1296)[Only woman ruler of this dynasty]
- Prataparudra II/ Rudradeva II (1296–1323). [Grandson of Queen Rudrama and last ruler of this dynasty]

=== Gahadavala dynasty (1072–1237) ===
List of rulers–

- Chandradeva (c. 1072–1103 CE), founder of dynasty
- Madanapala (c. 1104–1113 CE)
- Govindachandra (c. 1114–1155 CE
- Vijayachandra (c. 1155–1169 CE), alias Vijayapala or Malladeva
- Jayachandra (c. 1170–1194 CE), called Jaichand in vernacular legends
- Harishchandra (c. 1194– ?? CE),
- Adakkamalla (c. ?–1237 CE) last ruler of dynasty

=== Karnata dynasty of Mithila (1097 – 1324 CE) ===
List of rulers–

S.N.	Ruler	Regin
1	Nanyadeva	1097–1147
2	Gangadeva	1147–1187
3	Narsimhadeva	1187–1227
4	Ramasimhadeva	1227–1285
5	Shaktisimhadeva	1285–1295
6	Harisimhadeva	1295–1324

=== Chutia (Sadiya) Kingdom of Assam (1187–1524 CE) ===
List of rulers

- Birpal (1187–1224), founder of dynasty
- Ratnadhwajpal (1224–1250)
- Vijayadhwajpal (1250–1278)
- Vikramadhwajpal (1278–1302)
- Gauradhwajpal (1302–1322)
- Sankhadhwajpal (1322–1343)
- Mayuradhwajpal (1343–1361)
- Jayadhwajpal (1361–1383)
- Karmadhwajpal (1383–1401)
- Satyanarayan (1401–1421)
- Laksminarayan (1421–1439)
- Dharmanarayan (1439–1458)
- Pratyashnarayan (1458–1480)
- Purnadhabnarayan (1480–1502)
- Dharmadhajpal (1502–1522)
- Nitypal (1522–1524), last ruler of dynasty

== Late Medieval Period (c. 1200s CE – c. 1500s CE) ==
=== Delhi Sultanate (c. 1206–1526 CE) ===
==== Mamluk dynasty (1206–1290 CE) ====
- Qutb-ud-din Aibak (1206–1210)
- Aram Shah (1210–1211)
- Shams-ud-din Iltutmish (1211–1236)
- Rukn-ud-din Firuz (1236)
- Raziyyat ud din Sultana (1236–1240)
- Muiz-ud-din Bahram (1240–1242)
- Ala-ud-din Masud (1242–1246)
- Nasir-ud-din Mahmud (1246–1266)
- Ghiyas-ud-din Balban (1266–1286)
- Muiz-ud-din Qaiqabad (1286–1290)

==== Khalji dynasty (1290–1320 CE) ====
- Jalaluddin Firuz Khalji (1290–1296)
- Alauddin Khalji (1296–1316)
- Shihabuddin Omar Khan Khalji (1316)
- Qutbuddin Mubarak Shah Khalji (1316–1320)

==== Tughlaq dynasty (1321–1414 CE) ====
- Ghiyath al-Din Tughluq (1321–1325)
- Muhammad Shah Tughluq I (1325–1351)
- Firuz Shah Tughluq (1351–1388)
- Ghiyath al-Din Tughluq II (1388–1389)
- Abu Bakr Shah (1389–1390)
- Muhammad Shah Tughluq III (1390–1394)
- Ala ud-din Sikandar Shah Tughluq (1394)
- Muhammad Shah Tughuluq IV (1394–1413)

After the invasion of Timur in 1398, the governor of Multan, Khizr Khan abolished the Tughluq dynasty in 1414.

==== Jaunpur Sultanate (1394–1479 CE) ====
- Malik Sarwar Shah (1394–1399)
- Mubarak Shah (1399–1402)
- Ibrahim Shah (1402–1440)
- Mahmud Shah (1440–1457)
- Muhammad Shah (1457–1458)
- Hussain Shah (1458–1479)

==== Sayyid dynasty (1414–1451 CE) ====
- Khizr Khan (1414–1421)
- Mubarak Shah (1421–1434)
- Muhammad Shah (1434–1445)
- Alam Shah (1445–1451)

==== Lodi dynasty (1451–1526 CE) ====
- Bahlul Khan Lodi (1451–1489)
- Sikandar Khan Lodi (1489–1517)
- Ibrahim Khan Lodi (1517–1526), defeated by Babur (who replaced the Lodi Empire with the Mughal Empire)

=== Kadava dynasty (c. 1216–1279 CE) ===
- Kopperunchinga I (c. 1216–1242)
- Kopperunchinga II (c. 1243–1279)

=== Kingdom of Marwar (c. 1226–1950 CE) ===
==== Rathore dynasty of Jodhpur ====
===== Rulers from Pali & Mandore (1226–1438 CE) =====
Name		Reign began	Reign ended
1	Rao Siha	1226	1273
2	Rao Asthan	1273	1292
3	Rao Doohad	1292	1309
4	Rao Raipal	1309	1313
5	Rao Kanhapal	1313	1323
6	Rao Jalansi	1323	1328
7	Rao Chado	1328	1344
8	Rao Tida	1344	1357
9	Rao Kanha Dev	1357	1374
10	Rao Viram Dev	1374	1383
11	Rao Chandra	1383	1424
12	Rao Kanha	1424	1427
13	Rao Ranmal	1427	1438

===== Rulers from Jodhpur (1459–1950 CE) =====
Name		Reign began	Reign ended	
1	Rao Jodha	12 May 1438	6 April 1489	
2	Rao Satal	6 April 1489	March 1492	
3	Rao Suja	March 1492	2 October 1515	
4	Rao Biram Singh	2 October 1515	8 November 1515	
5	Rao Ganga	8 November 1515	9 May 1532	
6	Rao Maldeo	9 May 1532	7 November 1562	
7	Rao Chandra Sen	7 November 1562	1581	
8	Raja Udai Singh	4 August 1583	11 July 1595	
9	Sawai Raja Suraj-Mal	11 July 1595	7 September 1619	
10	Maharaja Gaj Singh I	7 September 1619	6 May 1638	
11	Maharaja Jaswant Singh	6 May 1638	28 December 1678	
12	Maharaja Ajit Singh	19 February 1679	24 June 1724	
13	Raja Indra Singh	9 June 1679	4 August 1679	
14	Maharaja Abhai Singh	24 June 1724	18 June 1749	
15	Maharaja Ram Singh	First reign	18 June 1749	July 1751
16	Maharaja Bakht Singh	July 1751	21 September 1752	
17	Maharaja Vijay Singh	21 September 1752	31 January 1753	
18	Maharaja Ram Singh	31 January 1753	September 1772	
19	Maharaja Vijay Singh	September 1772	17 July 1793	
20	Maharaja Bhim Singh	17 July 1793	19 October 1803	
21	Maharaja Man Singh	19 October 1803	4 September 1843	
22	Maharaja Sir Takht Singh	4 September 1843	13 February 1873	
23	Maharaja Sir Jaswant Singh II	13 February 1873	11 October 1895	
24	Maharaja Sir Sardar Singh	20 March 1911		
25	Maharaja Sir Sumair Singh	20 March 1911	3 October 1918	
26	Maharaja Sir Umaid Singh	3 October 1918	9 June 1947	
27	Maharaja Sir Hanwant Singh	9 June 1947	7 April 1949	
28	(titular) Maharaja Gaj Singh II of Jodhpur	26 January 1952	Present	

=== Ahom dynasty of Assam (c. 1228–1826 CE) ===
The list of Swargadeos of the Ahom Kingdom
Years	Reign	Ahom name	Other names	succession	End of reign	Capital
1228–1268	40y	Sukaphaa			natural death	Charaideo
1268–1281	13y	Suteuphaa		son of Sukaphaa	natural death	Charaideo
1281–1293	8y	Subinphaa		son of Suteuphaa	natural death	Charaideo
1293–1332	39y	Sukhaangphaa		son of Subinphaa	natural death	Charaideo
1332–1364	32y	Sukhrangpha		son of Sukhaangphaa	natural death	Charaideo
1364–1369	5y	Interregnum				
1369–1376	7y	Sutuphaa		brother of Sukhrangphaa	assassinated	Charaideo
1376–1380	4y	Interregnum				
1380–1389	9y	Tyao Khamti		brother of Sutuphaa	assassinated	Charaideo
1389–1397	8y	Interregnum				
1397–1407	10y	Sudangphaa	Baamuni Konwar	son of Tyao Khaamti	natural death	Charagua
1407–1422	15y	Sujangphaa		son of Sudangphaa	natural death	
1422–1439	17y	Suphakphaa		son of Sujangpha	natural death	
1439–1488	49y	Susenphaa		son of Suphakphaa	natural death	
1488–1493	5y	Suhenphaa		son of Susenphaa	assassinated	
1493–1497	4y	Supimphaa		son of Suhenphaa	natural death	
1497–1539	42y	Suhungmung	Swarganarayan, Dihingiaa Rojaa I	son of Supimphaa	assassinated	Bakata
1539–1552	13y	Suklenmung	Garhgayaan Rojaa	son of Suhungmung	natural death	Garhgaon
1552–1603	51y	Sukhaamphaa	Khuraa Rojaa	son of Suklenmung	natural death	Garhgaon
1603–1641	38y	Susenghphaa	Prataap Singha, Burhaa Rojaa, Buddhiswarganarayan	son of Sukhaamphaa	natural death	Garhgaon
1641–1644	3y	Suramphaa	Jayaditya Singha, Bhogaa Rojaa	son of Susenghphaa	deposed	Garhgaon
1644–1648	4y	Sutingphaa	Noriyaa Rojaa	brother of Suramphaa	deposed	Garhgaon
1648–1663	15y	Sutamla	Jayadhwaj Singha, Bhoganiyaa Rojaa	son of Sutingphaa	natural death	Garhgaon/Bakata
1663–1670	7y	Supangmung	Chakradhwaj Singha	cousin of Sutamla	natural death	Bakata/Garhgaon
1670–1672	2y	Sunyatphaa	Udayaditya Singha	brother of Supangmung	deposed	
1672–1674	2y	Suklamphaa	Ramadhwaj Singha	brother of Sunyatphaa	poisoned	
1674–1675	21d	Suhung	Samaguria Rojaa Khamjang	Samaguria descendant of Suhungmung	deposed	
1675-1675	24d		Gobar Roja	great-grandson of Suhungmung	deposed	
1675–1677	2y	Sujinphaa	Arjun Konwar, Dihingia Rojaa II	grandson of Pratap Singha, son of Namrupian Gohain	deposed, suicide	
1677–1679	2y	Sudoiphaa	Parvatia Rojaa	great-grandson of Suhungmung	deposed, killed	
1679–1681	3y	Sulikphaa	Ratnadhwaj Singha, Loraa Rojaa	Samaguria family	deposed, killed	
1681–1696	15y	Supaatphaa	Gadadhar Singha	son of Gobar Rojaa	natural death	Borkola
1696–1714	18y	Sukhrungphaa	Rudra Singha	son of Supaatphaa	natural death	Rangpur
1714–1744	30y	Sutanphaa	Siva Singha	son Sukhrungphaa	natural death	
1744–1751	7y	Sunenphaa	Pramatta Singha	brother of Sutanphaa	natural death	
1751–1769	18y	Suremphaa	Rajeswar Singha	brother of Sunenphaa	natural death	
1769–1780	11y	Sunyeophaa	Lakshmi Singha	brother of Suremphaa	natural death	
1780–1795	15y	Suhitpangphaa	Gaurinath Singha	son of Sunyeophaa	natural death	Jorhat
1795–1811	16y	Suklingphaa	Kamaleswar Singha	great-grandson of Lechai, the brother of Rudra Singha	natural death, smallpox	Jorhat
1811–1818	7y	Sudingphaa (1)	Chandrakaanta Singha	brother of Suklingphaa	deposed	Jorhat
1818–1819	1y		Purandar Singha (1)	descendant of Suremphaa	deposed	Jorhat
1819–1821	2y	Sudingphaa (2)	Chandrakaanta Singha		fled the capital	
1821–1822	1y		Jogeswar Singha	5th descendant of Jambor, the brother of Gadadhar Singha. Jogeswar was brother of Hemo Aideo, and was puppet of Burmese ruler	removed	
1833–1838			Purandar Singha (2)			

=== Vaghela dynasty (1244–1304 CE) ===
The sovereign Vaghela rulers include:

- Visala-deva (1244–1262), founder of the dynasty
- Arjuna-deva (1262–1275), son of Pratapamalla
- Rama (1275), son of Arjunadeva
- Saranga-deva (1275–1296), son of Arjunadeva
- Karna-deva (1296–1304), son of Rama; also called Karna II to distinguish him from Karna Chaulukya.

=== Jaffna (Aryachakravarti) dynasty (c. 1277–1619 CE) ===
List of rulers–

- Kulasekara Cinkaiariyan(1277–1284), founder of dynasty
- Kulotunga Cinkaiariyan (1284–1292)
- Vickrama Cinkaiariyan (1292–1302)
- Varodaya Cinkaiariyan (1302–1325)
- Martanda Cinkaiariyan (1325–1348)
- Gunabhooshana Cinkaiariyan (1348–1371)
- Virodaya Cinkaiariyan (1371–1380)
- Jeyaveera Cinkaiariyan (1380–1410)
- Gunaveera Cinkaiariyan (1410–1440)
- Kanakasooriya Cinkaiariyan (1440–1450 & 1467–1478)
- Singai Pararasasegaram (1478–1519)
- Cankili I (1519–1561)
- Puviraja Pandaram (1561–1565 & 1582–1591)
- Kasi Nayinar Pararacacekaran (1565–1570)
- Periyapillai (1565–1582)
- Ethirimana Cinkam (1591–1617)
- Cankili II Cekaracacekaran (1617–1619), last ruler of dynasty

=== Kingdom of Tripura (c. 1280–1949 CE) ===
==== Manikya dynasty ====
List of rulers–

- Ratna Manikya (1280 CE)
- Pratap Manikya (1350 CE)
- Mukul Manikya (1400 CE)

Kingdom of Tripura
- Part of History of Tripura
Kings of Tripura
Maha Manikya	c. 1400–1431
Dharma Manikya I	1431–1462
Ratna Manikya I	1462–1487
Pratap Manikya	1487
Vijaya Manikya I	1488
Mukut Manikya	1489
Dhanya Manikya	1490–1515
Dhwaja Manikya	1515–1520
Deva Manikya	1520–1530
Indra Manikya I	1530–1532
Vijaya Manikya II	1532–1563
Ananta Manikya	1563–1567
Udai Manikya I	1567–1573
Joy Manikya I	1573–1577
Amar Manikya	1577–1585
Rajdhar Manikya I	1586–1600
Ishwar Manikya	1600
Yashodhar Manikya	1600–1623
Interregnum	1623–1626
Kalyan Manikya	1626–1660
Govinda Manikya	1660–1661
Chhatra Manikya	1661–1667
Govinda Manikya	1661–1673
Rama Manikya	1673–1685
Ratna Manikya II	1685–1693
Narendra Manikya	1693–1695
Ratna Manikya II	1695–1712
Mahendra Manikya	1712–1714
Dharma Manikya II	1714–1725
Jagat Manikya	1725–1729
Dharma Manikya II	1729
Mukunda Manikya	1729–1739
Joy Manikya II	1739–1744
Indra Manikya II	1744–1746
Udai Manikya II	1744
Joy Manikya II	1746
Vijaya Manikya III	1746–1748
Lakshman Manikya	1740s/1750s
Interregnum	1750s–1760
Krishna Manikya	1760–1783
Rajdhar Manikya II	1785–1806
Rama Ganga Manikya	1806–1809
Durga Manikya	1809–1813
Rama Ganga Manikya	1813–1826
Kashi Chandra Manikya	1826–1829
Krishna Kishore Manikya	1829–1849
Ishan Chandra Manikya	1849–1862
Bir Chandra Manikya	1862–1896
Radha Kishore Manikya	1896–1909
Birendra Kishore Manikya	1909–1923
Bir Bikram Kishore Manikya	1923–1947
Kirit Bikram Kishore Manikya	1947–1949; 1949–1978 (titular)
Kirit Pradyot Manikya	1978–present (titular)

Tripura monarchy data
- Manikya dynasty (Royal family)
- Agartala (Capital of the kingdom)
- Ujjayanta Palace (Royal residence)
- Pushbanta Palace (Royal residence)
- Neermahal (Royal residence)
- Rajmala (Royal chronicle)
- Tripura Buranji (Chronicle)
- Chaturdasa Devata (Family deities)

On 9 September 1949, "Tripura Merger Agreement", was signed and come in effect from 15 October 1949 & Tripura became part of Indian Union.

=== Nayaka Kingdoms (c. 1325–1815 CE) ===
The Nayakas were originally military governors under the Vijayanagara Empire. It is unknown, in fact, if these founded dynasties were related, being branches of a major family, or if they were completely different families. Historians tend to group them by location.

==== Nayaka dynasty ====
Ruler	Reign	Capital
Prolaya	1323-1333	Warangal (Musunuri line)
Kapaya	1333-1368	Warangal (Musunuri line)
Warangal annexed to Recherla
Singama I	1335-1361	Rachakonda (Recherla line)
Anavotha I	1361-1384	Rachakonda (Recherla line)
Singama II	1384-1399	Rachakonda (Recherla line)
Anavotha II	1399-1421	Rachakonda (Recherla line)
Mada	1421-1430	Rachakonda (Recherla line)
Singama III	1430-1475	Rachakonda (Recherla line)
Rachakonda annexed to Vijayanagara Empire
Kumaravira Timma I	1441-1462	Gandikota (Pemmasani line)
Chenna Vibhudu	1462-1505	Gandikota (Pemmasani line)
Vaiyappa	1464-1490	Gingee (Gingee line)
Tubaki Krishnappa	1490-1520	Gingee (Gingee line)
Chaudappa	1499-1530	Keladi (Keladi line)
Ramalinga	1505-1540	Gandikota (Pemmasani line)
Achyutavijaya Ramachandra	1520-1540	Gingee (Gingee line)
Viswanatha	1529-1564	Madurai (Madurai line)
Sadashiva	1530-1566	Keladi (Keladi line)
Chevappa	1532-1580	Tanjore (Thanjavur line)
Bangaru Timma	1540-1565	Gandikota (Pemmasani line)
Muthialu	1540-1570	Gingee (Gingee line)
Krishnappa I	1564-1572	Madurai (Madurai line)
Narasimha	1565-1598	Gandikota (Pemmasani line)
Sankanna I	1566-1570	Keladi (Keladi line)
Timanna	1568-1589	Chitradurga (Chitradurga line)
Sankanna II the Younger (Chikka Sankanna)	1570-1580	Keladi (Keladi line)
Venkatappa	1570-1600	Gingee (Gingee line)
Virappa	1572-1595	Madurai (Madurai line)
Ramaraja	1580-1586	Keladi (Keladi line)
Achuthappa	1580-1614	Tanjore (Thanjavur line)
Venkatappa I the Elder (Hiriya Venkatappa)	1586-1629	Keladi (Keladi line)
Obanna-Madakari I	1589-1602	Chitradurga (Chitradurga line)
Krishnappa II	1595-1601	Madurai (Madurai line)
Timma	1598-1623	Gandikota (Pemmasani line)
Varadappa	1600-1620	Gingee (Gingee line)
Muthu Krishnappa	1601-1609	Madurai (Madurai line)
Kasturi Rangappa I	1602-1652	Chitradurga (Chitradurga line)
Muthu Virappa I	1609-1623	Madurai (Madurai line)
Raghunatha	1614-1634	Tanjore (Thanjavur line)
Appa	1620-1649	Gingee (Gingee line)
Gingee annexed to the Bijapur Sultanate
Chenna Timma	1623-1652	Gandikota (Pemmasani line)
Tirumala	1623-1659	Madurai (Madurai line)
Virabhadra	1629-1645	Keladi (Keladi line)
Vijaya Raghava	1634-1673	Tanjore (Thanjavur line)
Thanjavur annexed to the Maratha Empire
Shivappa	1645-1660	Keladi (Keladi line)
Madakari II	1652-1674	Chitradurga (Chitradurga line)
Kumaravira Timma II	1652-1685	Gandikota (Pemmasani line)
Gandikota annexed to the Sultanate of Golconda
Muthu Virappa II	1659	Madurai (Madurai line)
Chokanatha I	1659-1682	Madurai (Madurai line)
Venkatappa II the Younger (Chikka Venkatappa)	1660-1662	Keladi (Keladi line)
Bhadrappa	1662-1664	Keladi (Keladi line)
Somashekara I	1664-1672	Keladi (Keladi line)
Chennamma	1672-1697	Keladi (Keladi line)
Obanna II	1674-1675	Chitradurga (Chitradurga line)
Shoora Kantha	1675-1676	Chitradurga (Chitradurga line)
Chikanna	1676-1686	Chitradurga (Chitradurga line)
Regency of Queen Mangammal (1682-1689)
Aranga Krishna; Muthu Virappa III	1682-1689	Madurai (Madurai line)
Madakari III	1686-1688	Chitradurga (Chitradurga line)
Donne Rangappa	1688-1689	Chitradurga (Chitradurga line)
Regency of Queen Mangammal (1689-1704)
Vijayaranga; Chokanatha II	1689-1732	Madurai (Madurai line)
Bharamana	1689-1721	Chitradurga (Chitradurga line)
Basavappa	1697-1714	Keladi (Keladi line)
Somashekara II	1714-1739	Keladi (Keladi line)
Madakari IV	1721-1748	Chitradurga (Chitradurga line)
Meenakshi	1732-1736	Madurai (Madurai line)
Madurai annexed to the Nawab of Carnatic
Basavappa	1739-1754	Keladi (Keladi line)
Sri Vijaya Rajasinha	1739-1747	Kandy (Kandy line)
Kirti Sri Rajasinha	1747-1782	Kandy (Kandy line)
Kasturi Rangappa II	1748-1758	Chitradurga (Chitradurga line)
Basappa	1754-1759	Keladi (Keladi line)
Madakari V	1758-1779	Chitradurga (Chitradurga line)
Chitradurga annexed to the Kingdom of Mysore
Virammaji	1759-1763	Keladi (Keladi line)
Keladi annexed to the Kingdom of Mysore
Sri Rajadhi Rajasinha	1782-1798	Kandy (Kandy line)
Sri Vikrama Rajasinha	1798-1815	Kandy (Kandy line)
Kandy becomes a British colony

==== Vellore Nayaka Kingdom (c. 1540–1601 CE) ====
The list of nayaks are unclear. Some of the Nayaks are:

- Chinna Bommi Reddy
- Thimma Reddy Nayak
- Lingama Nayak

==== Other Nayaka kingdoms ====
- Nayakas of Shorapur
- Nayakas of Kalahasti
- Nayakas of Harappanahalli
- Nayakas of Gummanayakana Palya
- Nayakas of Kuppam
- Nayakas of Rayalaseema
- Nayakas of Jarimale
- Nayakas of Gudekote
- Nayakas of Nayakanahatti

=== Reddy Kingdom (c. 1325–1448 CE) ===
List of rulers–

- Prolaya Vema Reddy (1325–1335), founder of dynasty
- Anavota Reddy (1335–1364)
- Anavema Reddy (1364–1386)
- Kumaragiri Reddy (1386–1402)
- Kataya Vema Reddy (1395–1414)
- Allada Reddy (1414–1423)
- Veerabhadra Reddy (1423–1448), last ruler of dynasty

=== Oiniwar (Sugauna) dynasty of Mithila (c. 1325–1526 CE) ===
List of rulers–

According to historian Makhan Jha, the rulers of the Oiniwar dynasty are as follows:

- Nath Thakur, founder of dynasty in 1325 CE
- Atirupa Thakur
- Vishwarupa Thakur
- Govinda Thakur
- Lakshman Thakur
- Kameshwar Thakur
- Bhogishwar Thakur, ruled for over 33 years
- Ganeshwar Singh, reigned from 1355; killed by his cousins in 1371 after a long-running internecine dispute
- Kirti Singh
- Bhava Singh Deva
- Deva Simha Singh
- Shiva Simha Singh (or Shivasimha Rūpanārāyana), took power in 1402, missing in battle in 1406
- Lakhima Devi, chief wife of Shiva Simha Singh, ruled for 12 years from Raj Banauli. She committed sati after many years of waiting for her husband's return.
- Padma Simha Singh, took power in 1418 and died in 1431
- Viswavasa Devi, wife of Padma Singh, died in 1443
- Hara Singh Deva, younger brother of Deva Singh
- Nara Singh Deva, died in 1460
- Dhir Singh Deva
- Bhairva Singh Deva, died in 1515, brother of Dhir Singh Deva
- Rambhadra Deva
- Laxminath Singh Deva, last ruler died in 1526 CE

=== Vijayanagara Empire (c. 1336–1646 CE) ===
Vijayanagara Empire was ruled by four different dynasties for about 310 years on entire South India.

Serial no.	Regnal names	Reign (CE)
Sangama dynasty rulers (1336 to 1485 CE)
1	Harihara I	1336–1356
2	Bukka Raya I	1356–1377
3	Harihara II	1377–1404
4	Virupaksha Raya	1404–1405
5	Bukka Raya II	1405–1406
6	Deva Raya	1406–1422
7	Ramachandra Raya	1422
8	Vira Vijaya Bukka Raya	1422–1424
9	Deva Raya II	1424–1446
10	Mallikarjuna Raya	1446–1465
11	Virupaksha Raya II	1465–1485
12	Praudha Raya	1485
Saluva dynasty rulers (1485 to 1505 CE)
13	Saluva Narasimha Deva Raya	1485–1491
14	Thimma Bhupala	1491
15	Narasimha Raya II	1491–1505
Tuluva dynasty rulers (1491 to 1570 CE)
16	Tuluva Narasa Nayaka	1491–1503
17	Viranarasimha Raya	1503–1509
18	Krishnadevaraya	1509–1529
19	Achyuta Deva Raya	1529–1542
20	Sadasiva Raya	1542–1570
Aravidu dynasty rulers (1542 to 1646 CE)
21	Aliya Rama Raya	1542–1565
22	Tirumala Deva Raya	1565–1572
23	Sriranga Deva Raya	1572–1586
24	Venkatapati Deva Raya	1586–1614
25	Sriranga II	1614–1617
26	Rama Deva Raya	1617–1632
27	Peda Venkata Raya	1632–1642
28	Sriranga III	1642–1646/1652

=== Bahmani Sultanate (c. 1347–1527 CE) ===
- Ala-ud-Din Bahman Shah (1347–1358)
- Muhammad Shah I (1358–1375)
- Ala-ud-Din Mujahid Shah (1375–1378)
- Daud Shah I (1378)
- Muhammad Shah II (1378–1397)
- Ghiyas ud din Tahmatan Shah (1397)
- Shams ud din Daud Shah II (1397)
- Taj ud-Din Firuz Shah (1397–1422)
- Ahmad Shah I Wali (1422–1435), established his capital at Bidar
- Ala ud din Ahmad Shah II (1436–1458)
- Ala ud din Humayun Shah (1458–1461)
- Nizam-Ud-Din Ahmad III (1461–1463)
- Muhammad Shah III Lashkari (1463–1482)
- Mahmood Shah Bahmani II(1482–1518)
- Ahmad Shah IV (1518–1521)
- Ala ud din Shah (1521–1522)
- Waliullah Shah (1522–1524)
- Kalimullah Shah (1524–1527)

=== Malwa Sultanate (c. 1392–1562 CE) ===
Ghoris (1390–1436 CE)

- Dilavar Khan Husain (1390–1405)
- Alp Khan Hushang (1405–1435)
- Ghazni Khan Muhammad (1435–1436)
- Masud Khan (1436)

Khaljis (1436–1535 CE)

- Mahmud Shah I (1436–1469)
- Ghiyath Shah (1469–1500)
- Nasr Shah (1500–1511)
- Mahmud Shah II (1511–1530)

=== Baro-Bhuyan kingdoms (c. 1365–1632 CE) ===
List of Kingdoms and their rulers are

==== Baro-Bhuyan of Assam (1365–1440 CE) ====
- Sasanka (Arimatta) (1365–1385 CE)
- Gajanka (1385–1400 CE)
- Sukranka (1400–1415 CE)
- Mriganka (1415–1440 CE)

==== Baro-Bhuyan of Bengal (1576–1632 CE) ====
- Isa Khan
- Musa Khan (Bengal Ruler)
- Masum Khan

=== Tomara dynasty of Gwalior (c. 1375–1523 CE) ===
The Tomara rulers of Gwalior include the following.

Name in dynasty's inscriptions (IAST)	Reign	Names in Muslim chronicles and vernacular literature
Vīrasiṃha-deva	1375–1400 CE or (c. 1394–1400 CE)	Virsingh Dev, Bir Singh Tomar, Bar Singh (in Yahya's writings), Har Singh (in Badauni's writings), Nar Singh (in Firishta's and Nizamuddin's writings).
Uddharaṇa-deva	1400–1402 CE	Uddharan Dev, Usaran or Adharan (in Khadagrai's writings)
Virāma-deva	1402–1423 CE	Viram Dev, Biram Deo (in Yahya's writings), Baram Deo (in Firishta's writings)
Gaṇapati-deva	1423–1425 CE	Ganpati Dev
Dungarendra-deva alias Dungara-siṃha	1425–1459 CE	Dungar Singh, Dungar Sen
Kirtisiṃha-deva	1459–1480 CE	Kirti Singh Tomar
Kalyāṇamalla	1480–1486 CE	Kalyanmal, Kalyan Singh
Māna-siṃha	1486–1516 CE	Mana Sahi, Man Singh
Vikramāditya	1516–1523 CE	Vikram Sahi, Vikramjit

=== Wadiyar Kingdom of Mysore (c. 1399–1950 CE) ===
List of rulers

- Yaduraya Wodeyar or Raja Vijaya Raj Wodeyar (1399–1423 CE)
- Hiriya Bettada Chamaraja Wodeyar I (1423–1459 CE)
- Thimmaraja Wodeyar I (1459–1478 CE)
- Hiriya Chamaraja Wodeyar II (1478–1513 CE)
- Hiriya bettada Chamaraja Wodeyar III (1513–1553 CE)
- Thimmaraja Wodeyar II (1553–1572 CE)
- Bola Chamaraja Wodeyar IV (1572–1576 CE)
- Bettada Devaraja Wodeyar (1576–1578 CE)
- Raja Wodeyar I (1578–1617 CE)
- Chamaraja Wodeyar V (1617–1637 CE)
- Raja Wodeyar II (1637–1638 CE)
- Ranadhira Kantheerava Narasaraja Wodeyar I (1638–1659 CE)
- Dodda Devaraja Wodeyar (1659–1673 CE)
- Chikka Devaraja Wodeyar (1673–1704 CE)
- Kantheerava Narasaraja Wodeyar II (1704–1714 CE)
- Dodda Krishnaraja Wodeyar I (1714–1732 CE)
- Chamaraja Wodeyar VI (1732–1734 CE)
- Immadi Krishnaraja Wodeyar II (1734–1766 CE), ruled under Hyder Ali from 1761 CE
- Nanajaraja Wodeyar (1766–1770 CE), ruled under Hyder Ali
- Bettada Chamaraja Wodeyar VII (1772–1776 CE), ruled under Hyder Ali
- Khasa Chamaraja Wodeyar VIII (1776–1796 CE), ruled under Hyder Ali until 1782 CE, then under Tipu Sultan until his deposition in 1796 CE.
  - Hyder Ali (1761–1782 CE), usurper and non-dynastic
  - Tipu Sultan (1782–1799 CE), son of the previous.
- Mummudi Krishnaraja Wodeyar III (1799–1868 CE), Wodeyar dynasty restored
- Chamaraja Wodeyar X (1868–1894 CE)
- Vani Vilas Sannidhana, queen of Chamaraja Wodeyar IX served as regent from (1894 to 1902 CE)
- Nalvadi Krishnaraja Wodeyar IV (1894–1940 CE)
- Jayachamaraja Wodeyar Bahadur (1940–1950 CE)

=== Gajapati Empire (c. 1434–1541 CE) ===
Rulers–

Picture	King	Reign
	Kapilendra Deva	1434–1467
	Purushottama Deva	1467–1497
	Prataparudra Deva	1497–1540
	Kalua Deva	1540–1541
	Kakharua Deva	1541

=== Rathore dynasty of Bikaner (c. 1465–1947 CE) ===
Rulers–

Name		Reign Began (in CE)	Reign Ended (in CE)
1	Rao Bika	1465	1504
2	Rao Narayan Singh	1504	1505
3	Rao Luna Karana (Lon-Karan)	1505	1526
4	Rao Jait Singh (Jetasi)	1526	1542
5	Rao Kalyan Mal	1542	1574
6	Rao Rai Singh I (Rai Rai Singh)	1574	1612
7	Rai Dalpat Singh (Dalip)	1612	1613
8	Rai Surat Singh Bhuratiya	1613	1631
9	Rao Karan Singh (Jangalpat Badhshah)	1631	1667
10	Anup Singh	1669	1698
11	Rao Sarup Singh	1698	1700
12	Rao Sujan Singh	1700	1735
13	Rao Zorawar Singh	1735	1746
14	Rao Gaj Singh	1746	1787
15	Rao Rai Singh II (Raj Singh)	1787	1787
16	Rao Pratap Singh	1787	1787
17	Rao Surat Singh	1787	1828
18	Rao Ratan Singh	1828	1851
19	Rao Sardar Singh	1851	1872
20	Dungar Singh	1872	1887
21	Ganga Singh	1887	1943
22	Sadul Singh	1943	1947
23	Karni Singh	1947	1971

=== Deccan Sultanates (c. 1490–1686 CE) ===
==== Barid Shahi dynasty (1490–1619 CE) ====
- Qasim Barid I 1490–1504
- Amir Barid I 1504–1542
- Ali Barid Shah I 1542–1580
- Ibrahim Barid Shah 1580–1587
- Qasim Barid Shah II 1587–1591
- Ali Barid Shah II 1591
- Amir Barid Shah II 1591–1601
- Mirza Ali Barid Shah III 1601–1609
- Amir Barid Shah III 1609–1619

==== Imad Shahi dynasty (1490–1572 CE) ====
- Fathullah Imad-ul-Mulk (1490–1504)
- Aladdin Imad Shah (1504–1530)
- Darya Imad Shah (1530–1562)
- Burhan Imad Shah (1562–1574)
- Tufal Khan 1574

==== Adil Shahi dynasty (1490–1686 CE) ====
- Yusuf Adil Shah (1490–1511)
- Ismail Adil Shah (1511–1534)
- Mallu Adil Shah (1534)
- Ibrahim Adil Shah I (1534–1558)
- Ali Adil Shah I (1558–1579)
- Ibrahim Adil Shah II (1580–1627)
- Mohammed Adil Shah, Sultan of Bijapur (1627–1657)
- Ali Adil Shah II (1657–1672)
- Sikandar Adil Shah (1672–1686)

==== Nizam Shahi dynasty (1490–1636 CE) ====
- Malik Ahmad Nizam Shah I 1490–1510
- Burhan Nizam Shah I 1510–1553
- Hussain Nizam Shah I 1553–1565
- Murtaza Nizam Shah I 1565–1588
- Hussain Nizam Shah II 1588–1589
- Ismail Nizam Shah 1589–1591
- Burhan Nizam Shah II 1591–1595
- Ibrahim Nizam Shah 1595–1596
- Malik Ahmad Nizam Shah II 1596
- Bahadur Nizam Shah 1596–1600
- Murtaza Nizam Shah II 1600–1610
- Burhan Nizam Shah III 1610–1631
- Hussain Nizam Shah III 1631–1633
- Murtaza Nizam Shah III 1633–1636

==== Qutb Shahi dynasty (1518–1686 CE) ====
- Sultan Quli Qutbl Mulk (1518–1543)
- Jamsheed Quli Qutb Shah (1543–1550)
- Subhan Quli Qutb Shah (1550)
- Ibrahim Quli Qutub Shah (1550–1580)
- Muhammad Quli Qutb Shah (1580–1612)
- Sultan Muhammad Qutb Shah (1612–1626)
- Abdullah Qutb Shah (1626–1672)
- Abul Hasan Qutb Shah (1672–1686)

=== Gatti Mudalis of Taramangalam (c. 15th–17th century CE) ===
List of known rulers–

- Vanagamudi Gatti
- Immudi Gatti
- Gatti Mudali

== Early Modern Period (c. 1500s CE – 1850s CE) ==
=== Kingdom of Cochin (c. 1503–1948 CE) ===
List of Maharajas of Cochin

=== Koch Kingdom (c. 1515–1949 CE) ===
List of Maharajas of Koch

=== Mughal Empire (c. 1526–1857 CE) ===
List of emperors of the Mughal Empire

=== Sur Empire (c. 1540–1555 CE) ===
List of rulers of the Sur Empire

=== Gajapati of Odisha ===
Lists of Gajapatis

=== Khurda Kingdom ===
List of rulers of Khurda

=== Kingdom of Sikkim (c. 1642–1975 CE) ===
List of Chogyals of Sikkim

=== Maratha Empire (c. 1674–1818 CE) ===
List of emperors of the Maratha Empire

==== Thanjavur Maratha kingdom (c. 1674–1855 CE) ====
List of Thanjavur Maratha rulers

==== The Peshwas (c. 1713–1858 CE) ====
List of Peshwas

==== Baroda State (c. 1721–1947 CE) ====
List of Maharajas of Baroda

==== Gwalior State (c. 1731–1947 CE) ====
List of Maharajas of Ujjain and Gwalior

==== Indore State (c. 1731–1948 CE) ====
List of Maharajas of Indore

=== Kingdom of Bengal (c. 1717–1757 CE) ===
List of rulers-

- Nawab Murshid Quli Khan (1717–1727), first ruler
- Nawab Shuja Ud Din Muhammad Khan (1727–1739)
- Nawab Sarfaraz Khan (1739–1740)
- Nawab Alivardi Khan (1740–1756)
- Nawab Siraj-ud-Daulah (1756–1757), last ruler

=== Sinsinwar Jat Kingdom of Bharatpur and Deeg (c. 1683–1947 CE) ===
List of rulers

Sinsinwar Jats of Bharatpur & Deeg (1683–1947)
Ruler	Years
Raja Ram Sinsinwar	1683–1688
Churaman	1695–1721
Muhkam Singh	1721–1722
Badan Singh	1722–1755
Suraj Mal	1755–1763
Jawahar Singh	1764–1768
Ratan Singh	1768–1769
Kehri Singh	1769–1778
Ranjit Singh	1778–1805
Randhir Singh	1805–1823
Baldeo Singh	1823–1825
Balwant Singh	1825–1853
Jaswant Singh	1853–1893
Ram Singh	1893–1900
Kishan Singh	1918–1929
Brijendra Singh	1929–1947

=== Pudukkottai Kingdom (c. 1686–1948 CE) ===
Rulers-

- Raghunatha Raya Tondaiman (1686–1730), first ruler
- Vijaya Raghunatha Raya Tondaiman I (1730–1769)
- Raya Raghunatha Tondaiman (1769–1789)
- Vijaya Raghunatha Tondaiman (December 1789–1 February 1807)
- Vijaya Raghunatha Raya Tondaiman II (1 February 1807–June 1825)
- Raghunatha Tondaiman (June 1825–13 July 1839)
- Ramachandra Tondaiman (13 July 1839 – 15 April 1886)
- Martanda Bhairava Tondaiman (15 April 1886 – 28 May 1928)
- Rajagopala Tondaiman (28 October 1928 – 15 August 1947), last ruler

=== Sivaganga Kingdom (c. 1725–1947 CE) ===
Rulers–

- Muthu Vijaya Raghunatha Periyavudaya Thevar (1725–1750), founder of kingdom
- Muthu Vaduganatha Periyavudaya Thevar (1750–1780)
- Velu Nachiyar (1780–1790)
- Vellacci (1790–1793)
- Vangam Periya Udaya Thevar (1793–1801), last independent ruler

Zamindar under British rule (1803–1947)

=== Kingdom of Travancore (c. 1729–1949 CE) ===
Rulers–

- Marthanda Varma (1729–1758 CE), founder of kingdom
- Dharma Raja (1758–1798 CE)
- Balarama Varma (1798–1810CE)
- Gowri Lakshmi Bayi (1810–1815 CE)
- Gowri Parvati Bayi (1815–1829 CE)
- Swathi Thirunal (1829–1846 CE)
- Uthram Thirunal (1846–1860 CE)
- Ayilyam Thirunal (1860–1880 CE)
- Visakham Thirunal (1880–1885 CE)
- Moolam Thirunal (1885–1924 CE)
- Sethu Lakshmi Bayi (1924–1931 CE)
- Chithira Thirunal (1931–1949 CE), last ruler

=== Newalkar dynasty of Jhansi (c. 1769–1858 CE) ===
List of rulers–

- Raghunath Rao (1769–1796)
- Shiv Hari Rao (1796–1811)
- Ramchandra Rao (1811–1835)
- Raghunath Rao III (1835–1838)
- Sakku Bai Rao (1838–1839)
- Gangadhar Rao (1843–1853)
- Rani Lakshmi Bai as regent of Damodar Rao of Jhansi (21 November 1853 – 10 March 1854, 4 June 1857 – 4/5 April 1858)

=== Phulkian Dynasty of Punjab (c. 1763–1947) ===
Phulkian dynasty

Maharaja of Patiala

Nabha State

Jind State

=== Sikh Empire (c. 1801–1849 CE) ===
Maharaja of Punjab

=== Smaller Muslim polities ===
- Hyderabad State
- Nawab of Awadh
- Nawab of Bengal
- Kingdom of Mysore
  - Hyder Ali
  - Tipu Sultan

=== Dogra dynasty of Kashmir and Jammu (c. 1846–1952 CE) ===
Maharaja of Kashmir and Jammu

== Modern India (c. 1850s onwards) ==
=== Indian Empire (1858–1947 CE) ===
Portrait	Name	Birth	Reign	Death	Consort	Imperial Durbar	Royal House
	Victoria	24 May 1819	1 May 1876 – 22 January 1901	22 January 1901	None (Note: Victoria's husband Prince Albert died on 14 December 1861.)	1 January 1877 (represented by Lord Lytton)	Hanover
	Edward VII	9 November 1841	22 January 1901 – 6 May 1910	6 May 1910	Alexandra of Denmark	1 January 1903 (represented by Lord Curzon)	Saxe-Coburg and Gotha
	George V	3 June 1865	6 May 1910 – 20 January 1936	20 January 1936	Mary of Teck	12 December 1911	Saxe-Coburg and Gotha (1910–1917) Windsor (1917–1936)
	Edward VIII	23 June 1894	20 January 1936 – 11 December 1936	28 May 1972	None	None (Note: Edward VIII abdicated after less than one year of reign.)	Windsor
	George VI	14 December 1895	11 December 1936 – 15 August 1947	6 February 1952	Elizabeth Bowes-Lyon	None (Note: A durbar was deemed expensive and impractical due to poverty and demands for independence.)	Windsor

=== Dominion of India (1947–1950 CE) ===
Portrait	Name	Birth	Reign	Death	Consort	Royal House
	George VI	14 December 1895	15 August 1947 – 26 January 1950	6 February 1952	Elizabeth Bowes-Lyon	Windsor

== See also ==
- Greater India
- History of India
- History of Hinduism
- Middle kingdoms of India
- Timeline of Indian history
- List of wars involving India
- Pottery in the Indian subcontinent
- Outline of South Asian history
- History of Republic of India (1947–present)

=== Other lists of monarchs ===
- List of Tamil monarchs
- List of rulers of Assam
- List of rulers of Malwa
- List of rulers of Bengal
- List of rulers of Odisha
- List of rulers of India
- Lists of ancient kings
- List of heads of state of India
- List of Manipuri kings
- List of monarchs of Kashmir
- Legendary early Chola kings
- List of monarchs of Magadha
- List of Lunar dynasty kings
- List of Solar dynasty kings
- List of Jat dynasties and states
- List of Rajput dynasties and states
- List of Brahmin dynasties and states
- List of Jain states and dynasties
- List of Maratha dynasties and states
- List of rulers of the Delhi Sultanate
- List of dynasties and rulers of Rajasthan
- List of Rajput dynasties and states
- List of Hindu empires and dynasties
- List of Ahir Dynasties and rulers

== Notes ==
Timeline and cultural period	Indus plain (Punjab-Sapta Sindhu-Gujarat)	Gangetic Plain			Central India	Southern India
Timeline and cultural period	Indus plain (Punjab-Sapta Sindhu-Gujarat)	Upper Gangetic Plain (Ganga-Yamuna doab)	Middle Gangetic Plain	Lower Gangetic Plain	Central India	Southern India
IRON AGE
Culture	Late Vedic Period	Late Vedic Period; Painted Grey Ware culture	Late Vedic Period; Northern Black Polished Ware		Pre-history	
6th century BCE	Gandhara	Kuru-Panchala	Magadha		Adivasi (tribes)	Assaka
Culture	Persian-Greek influences	"Second Urbanisation"; Rise of Shramana movements Jainism - Buddhism - Ājīvika - Yoga			Pre-history	
5th century BCE	(Persian conquests)		Shaishunaga dynasty		Adivasi (tribes)	Assaka
4th century BCE	(Greek conquests)	Nanda empire				
HISTORICAL AGE
Culture	Spread of Buddhism				Pre-history	
3rd century BCE	Maurya Empire					Satavahana dynasty Sangam period (300 BCE – 200 CE); Early Cholas; Early Pandyan kingdom Cheras
Culture	Preclassical Hinduism (Note: Michaels (2004) p.39) - "Hindu Synthesis" (Note: Hiltebeitel (2002)) (ca. 200 BCE - 300 CE) (Note: Michaels (2004) p.39) (Note: Hiltebeitel (2002)); Epics - Puranas - Ramayana - Mahabharata - Bhagavad Gita - Brahma Sutras - Smarta Tradition; Mahayana Buddhism					
2nd century BCE	Indo-Greek Kingdom		Shunga Empire; Maha-Meghavahana Dynasty			Satavahana dynasty Sangam period (300 BCE – 200 CE); Early Cholas; Early Pandyan kingdom Cheras
1st century BCE	Indo-Greek Kingdom		Shunga Empire; Maha-Meghavahana Dynasty			Satavahana dynasty Sangam period (300 BCE – 200 CE); Early Cholas; Early Pandyan kingdom Cheras
1st century CE	Indo-Scythians; Indo-Parthians		Kuninda Kingdom			Satavahana dynasty Sangam period (300 BCE – 200 CE); Early Cholas; Early Pandyan kingdom Cheras
2nd century	Kushan Empire					Satavahana dynasty Sangam period (300 BCE – 200 CE); Early Cholas; Early Pandyan kingdom Cheras
3rd century	Kushano-Sasanian Kingdom; Western Satraps	Kushan Empire		Kamarupa kingdom	Adivasi (tribes)	Satavahana dynasty Sangam period (300 BCE – 200 CE); Early Cholas; Early Pandyan kingdom Cheras
Culture	"Golden Age of Hinduism"(ca. CE 320-650) (Note: Michaels (2004) p.40); Puranas - Kural; Co-existence of Hinduism and Buddhism					
4th century	Kidarites	Gupta Empire; Varman dynasty				Andhra Ikshvakus; Kalabhra dynasty Kadamba Dynasty; Western Ganga Dynasty
5th century	Hephthalite Empire	Alchon Huns				Vishnukundina; Kalabhra dynasty
6th century	Nezak Huns; Kabul Shahi; Maitraka				Adivasi (tribes)	Vishnukundina; Badami Chalukyas; Kalabhra dynasty
Culture	Late-Classical Hinduism (ca. CE 650-1100) (Note: Michaels (2004) p.41); Advaita Vedanta - Tantra; Decline of Buddhism in India					
7th century	Indo-Sassanids		Vakataka dynasty Empire of Harsha	Mlechchha dynasty	Adivasi (tribes)	Badami Chalukyas; Eastern Chalukyas; Pandyan kingdom (revival); Pallava
7th century	Karkota dynasty				Adivasi (tribes)	
8th century	Kabul Shahi	Pala Empire			Adivasi (tribes)	Eastern Chalukyas; Pandyan kingdom Kalachuri
9th century	Gurjara-Pratihara				Adivasi (tribes)	Rashtrakuta Empire; Eastern Chalukyas; Pandyan kingdom Medieval Cholas; Chera Perumals of Makkotai
10th century	Ghaznavids			Pala dynasty Kamboja-Pala dynasty	Adivasi (tribes)	Kalyani Chalukyas; Eastern Chalukyas; Medieval Cholas; Chera Perumals of Makkotai; Rashtrakuta
References and sources for table References Sources: Flood, Gavin D. (1996), An Introduction to Hinduism, Cambridge University Press; Hiltebeitel, Alf (2002), Hinduism. In: Joseph Kitagawa, "The Religious Traditions of Asia: Religion, History, and Culture", Routledge; Michaels, Axel (2004), Hinduism. Past and present, Princeton, New Jersey: Princeton University Press
