= Tailapa =

Tailapa may refer to:

- Tailapa I, a feudatory to the Rashtrakutas, ancestor of Tailapa II and Tailapa III
- Tailapa II (r. 993–997), founder of the Western Chalukya dynasty of India
- Tailapa III (r. 1151–1164), Western Chalukya king of India
