= Jatavarman =

Jatavarman is a given name. Notable people with the name include:

- Jatavarman Parakrama Pandyan, Pandyan king
- Jatavarman Sundara Pandyan I, Pandyan king
- Jatavarman Vira Pandyan II, Pandyan king
