= Rulers of India =

Rulers of India may refer to:

- Lists of rulers of India
- Rulers of India series edited by William Wilson Hunter
