= Jagadhekamalla III =

Jagadhekamalla III (r. 1163–1183 CE) succeeded Tailapa III to the highly diminished Western Chalukya empire. His rule was completely overshowded by the emergence of the Southern Kalachuris under Bijjala II who took control of Basavakalyana and ruled from there. He found refuge in the Banavasi region of the Western Ghats, while Bijjala his former vassal became suzerain at Kalyana in 1162. The king in exile was a contemporary of Basavanna and other noted Veerashaiva preceptors (known as Shivasharanas).

Preceded by Tailapa III	Western Chalukyas; 1164–1183	Succeeded by Someshvara IV
