= Lists of political office-holders in India =

For Lists of rulers of India, see:

- List of Indian monarchs (c. 3000 BCE – 1956 CE)
- List of presidents of India (1950–present)
- List of prime ministers of India (1947–present)
