= Keshidhwaja Janaka =

King of Mithila

Keshidhwaja
- Janaka
- Father: Kritadhvaja Janaka
Names
- Keshidhwaja Janaka
- Dynasty: Janaka
- Dynasty: Mithila Kingdom
- Religion: Hinduism
- Occupation: King

Keshidhwaja Janaka (Sanskrit: केशिध्वज जनक, Romanised: Keśidhvaja Janaka) was a king of the ancient Mithila Kingdom in the Indian subcontinent. He is mentioned in the text Vishnu Purana. The story of the king Keshidhwaja Janaka was narrated by the sage Parashara in the text Vishnu Purana when inquired by his pupil Maitreya. According to the text he was a philosopher king and endowed with spiritual knowledge. He was adept in metaphysics.

== Early life ==
Keshidhwaja was born in a Kshetriya family. He was the son of the king Kritadhvaja Janaka in Mithila. He was a descendant of the Janaka dynasty. His grandfather was Dharmadhwaja Janaka.

== Rule ==
According to the text Vishnu Purana, the king Dharmadhwaja Janaka had two sons. They were Amitadhvaja and Kritadhvaja. Their sons were Khandikya and Keshidhwaja respectively. Khandikya was a king and interested in karma yoga (rituals), whereas Keshidhwaja was interested in acquiring spiritual knowledge. Both kept trying to outdo each other. Eventually, the king Khandikya lost his kingdom to his cousin brother Keshidhwaja and was expelled from the kingdom to forest. After that Keshidhwaja ascended the throne of the kingdom and became the king of Mithila.
