= Karala Janaka =

- King Karala Janaka
- Monarchy: Dvapara Yuga
- Born: Mithila region
- Cause of death: Curse by a victim Brahmin
Regnal name
- Videha Raj Karala Janaka
- Country: Kingdom of Videha
- Dynasty: Janaka Dynasty
- Religion: Hinduism
- Court of King Janaka

Karala Janaka ( Sanskrit: कराला जनक ) was one of the kings during the periods of Janaka Dynasty in the kingdom of Mithila. Most of scholars has accepted King Karala Janaka as the last King in the Janaka Dynasty of the Mithila Kingdom. According to the available literary texts related to Mithila, it is evident that there may be two different kings with the same name Karala Janaka in different periods of time in the ancient Mithila Kingdom. The one which is mentioned in Shanti Parva of Mahabharata and the other as the last King in the Janaka lineage mentioned in the Arthshastra of Chanakya.

Professor Raychoudhari identifies Karala Janaka with the king Kriti Janaka of Mithila in the Puranas.

== Description in Mahabharata ==
In the Shanti Parva of Mahābhārata, there is a philosophical dialogue between Guru Vashishtha and King Karala Janaka known as Vashishtha Karala Janaka Samvad. The dialogue is about the teaching of Shamkhya philosophy to the king Karala Janaka by the Vedic sage Brahmarshi Vashishtha. It describes the Twenty five tattvas. These tattvas are described with slight difference from the Sāṃkhya philosophy. Shanti Parva describes twenty five tattvas in five Sargas called Vidya Sarga, Avidya Sarga, Bhutasarga, Vaikrtasarga and Bhautika Sarga.

=== Concept of Purusha and Prakriti ===
Once King Karala Janaka was confused in understanding the meaning of Purusha and Prakriti in Shamkhya philosophy. He mistakenly understood "Purusha" as man ( male gender ) and "Prakriti" as woman ( female gender ). He told Guru Vashishtha that the relationship between Purusha and Prakriti is same as the reproductive relation between male and female. Male and female of all the creatures unite to reproduce. He further said that father contributes bone, sinews and marrow, and mother contributes blood, skin and flesh to their children. But this was a false analogy. Then Guru Vashishtha replied to the king that you had understood the superficial meaning of the texts not the real meaning. He further clarified the real meaning of the texts. He told that all the parts of the body including skin, blood, flesh, bones, and sinews etc come from Prakriti not from Purusha.

Guru Vashishtha further quoted "Matter can arise from matter only not from spirit. But Prakriti itself is sexless and genderless, though the things that arise from it acquire sex and gender".

== Description as last King in Janaka Dynasty ==
It is said that Mithila was ruled by the Janakas for more than five centuries and the last king of the Janaka dynasty was Karala Janaka, who was overthrown along with his kingdom and family through a popular uprising and died.

=== Death of Karala Janaka ===
King Karala Janaka, who was on a pilgrimage to Yogeshwara, saw the crowd of people with curiosity, there he saw a young and beautiful wife of a Brahmin and being lustful he forcibly took her into the city. Then the Brahmin became angry and went into the city crying and cursed "Why does the city not break down where such an evil soul resides?" It is said that because of his curse the earth cracked there and consequently the king along with his entire family got buried in it. This story is mentioned in Arthshastra and Buddhacharitra.

== After the Death of Karala Janaka ==
After the death of Karala Janaka, Mithila became a republic and a constituent part of the Vajjian confederacy, which was later destroyed by King Ajatashatru of Magadha. But according some scholars, Mithila remained monarchy even after the end of Janaka Dynasty.
