= Khandikya Janaka =

King of Mithila

- Janaka
- Successor: Keshidhwaja Janaka
- Born: Khandikya; Mithila
Era dates
- Later Ramayana
- Father: Amitadhvaja Janaka

Khandikya Janaka (Sanskrit: खांडिक्य जनक) was a king in the ancient Kingdom of Mithila in the Indian subcontinent. He was a descendant of the Janaka dynasty in Mithila. He is mentioned in the texts Vishnu Purana, Bhagavat Purana and Narada Purana of Hinduism. He is an important figure in philosophical discourse of the texts.

== Early life ==
He was born in the royal family of the King Dharmadhwaja Janaka of the Videha empire in the subcontinent. His father was Amitadhvaja Janaka. Khandikya was well versed in Vedic Karma and rituals. He was the cousin brother of the King Keshidhwaja Janaka. In the texts, there is philosophical dialogues between the two cousins in the Janaka dynasty of Mithila.
