= Jatavarman Parakrama Pandyan =

- Reign: 1473–1506
Regnal name
- Azhagan Perumal Parakrama Pandyan
- House: Pandyan
- Religion: Hinduism

Jatavarman Parakrama Pandyan was a ruler of the Pandyan dynasty between 1473 and 1506. He was known by the regnal title of Azhagan Perumal, while his inscriptions start with Pumisaivvanitai (in Tamil) and Samastabhuvaikavira (in Sanskrit). He made additions to the temple at Tenkasi and claimed military victories against Kerala.
