= Someshvara IV =

King of the Western Chalukya empire

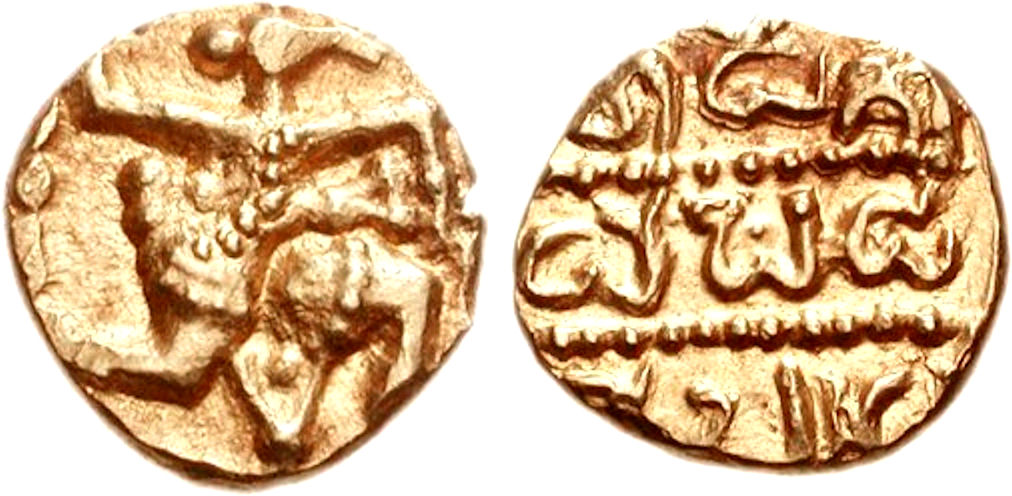
Coin of the Chalukyas of Kalyana (Western Chalukyas). Possibly King Somesvara IV (1181-4/1189). Garuda, with prominent beak, running right [“Dapaga dapasa Murari”] in Kannada in three lines divided by pelleted lines.

Someshvara IV (IAST: Someśvara; r. 1181–1189) was the last king of the Western Chalukya empire. He made a brief attempt after 1189 to revive the Chalukya kingdom by defeating the waning Kalachuri kingdom. He managed to capture Basavakalyana briefly but failed to prevent the other feudatories, the Seuna, Hoysala and the Kakatiya dynasty from completely overwhelming the Chalukya empire by 1200. In the end, the three feudatories divided the vast area between the Kaveri River and Narmada River amongst themselves.

He maintained friendly relations with Ceylon and sent an ambassador there. He made efforts to revive Chalukya dominance by defeating the declining Kalachuri kingdom He was overthrown by a Seuna Yadava feudatory

Preceded by Jagadhekamalla III	Western Chalukyas; 1183–1200	Succeeded by Veera Ballala II
