= Tailapa III =

Western Chalukya Emperor from 1151 to 1162

Western Chalukya Emperor
- Reign: 1151–1162
- Predecessor: Jagadhekamalla II
- Successor: Someshvara IV
- Died: 1162
- House: Chalukya dynasty
- Father: Someshvara III

Tailapa III (r. 1151–1162) succeeded his brother Jagadhekamalla II to the Western Chalukya throne. His rule saw the beginning of the end of the Chalukya empire. Kakatiya dynasty's Prola II warred with him, defeated and took the Chalukya king captive. This resulted in other feudatories rising against the Chalukyas. The Seuna and the Hoysala started to take away territory. Kalachuri Bijjala II captured the regal capital Kalyani in 1157 when Tailapa III had to flee to Annigeri (Dharwad district). Finally Tailapa III was killed by Hoysala Vira Narasimha in 1162.

== Sources ==
- Kamath, Dr. Suryanath (2001), A Concise History of Karnataka:(from Pre-historic Times to the Present); Rev. Engl. Version of Karnatakadasankshipta Itihasa, Archana Prakashana, 1980
- Sen, S.N. (1976), Ancient Indian History and Civilization, New Age International, p. 387, ISBN 978-81-224-1198-0
- Jayapalan, N (2001), History of India, Atlantic, p. 151, ISBN 9788171569281
- Chatterjee, Amitava (2014), History: UGC-NET/SET/JRF (Paper II and III), 1/e, Dorling Kindersley (India) Pvt. Ltd., ISBN 9789332520622
- Tripathi, Rama Shankar (1967), History of Ancient India, MOTILAL BANARSIDASS PUBLISHERS PRIVATE LIMITED, ISBN 9788120800182
- Pratiyogita Darpan, Editorial Team, optional indian history ancient india
