= List of Brahmin dynasties and states =

Brahmins make up one of the four varnas (social classes) within traditional Hindu society. The traditional occupation of Brahmins is that of priesthood, and the performing of rite of passage rituals. There have also been Brahmins rulers, zamindars and holders of other administrative posts.

== Dynasties ==
- Aryacakravarti dynasty of the Jaffna kingdom in Sri Lanka, founded by a Tamil Brahmin family from Rameswaram.
- Brahmin dynasty of Sindh, founded by Chach of Alor, later ruled by Chandar of Sindh and Dahir of Aror.
- Kadamba Dynasty (345–525 CE), dynasty that ruled northern Karnataka and the Konkan from Banavasi in present-day Uttara Kannada district.
- Kanva Dynasty, replaced the Shunga Empire in Magadha and ruled in the eastern regions of India.
- Oiniwar dynasty, based in Mithila were Maithil Brahmins.
- Parivrajaka dynasty, ruled parts of central India during the 5th and 6th centuries. The kings of this dynasty bore the title Maharaja, and probably ruled as feudatories of the Gupta Empire.
- Patwardhan dynasty, Indian dynasty established by a Chitpavan BrahminPatwardhan family.
- Shunga Empire, of Magadha was established by Pushyamitra Shunga.

== Princely states and zamindari estates ==
- Arni jagir of Madras Presidency, ruled by Deshastha Brahmins.
- Aundh State, ruled by Deshasthas Brahmins.
- Banaili Estate of Bihar, ruled by Maithil Brahmins.
- Bhawal Estate of Bengal, ruled by Shrotriya Brahmins.
- Bhor State, a 9-gun salute princely state ruled by Deshasthas Brahmins.
- Chaube Jagirs, a group of five feudatory princely states of central India during the period of the British Raj, which were ruled by different branches of Brahmin families.
- Darbhanga Raj of Mithila, Bihar, ruled by Maithil Brahmins.
- Dighapatia Raj of Bengal, ruled by a Varendra Brahmin family.
- Gaurihar State of Madhya Pradesh, ruled by a Deshastha Brahmin family.
- Jalaun State of Bundelkhand, ruled by a Deshastha Brahmin family.
- Jamkhandi State, ruled by a Chitpavan Brahmin family.
- Jhansi State, ruled by the Newalkars (Karhades Brahmins).
- Kurundvad Senior and Kurundvad Junior, princely states ruled by the Patwardhan clan of Chitpavan Brahmins.
- Miraj Junior and Miraj Senior, princely states ruled by Chitpavan Brahmins.
- Nadia Raj of Bengal, ruled by the Roy or Ray lineage (Kulin Brahmins).
- Natore Raj of Bengal, ruled by the Roy lineage (Varendra Brahmins).
- Rajshahi Raj of Bengal, ruled by the Moitra family (Varendra Brahmins).
- Ramdurg State, ruled by a Chitpavan Brahmin family.
- Sangli State, an 11-gun salute princely state ruled by a Chitpavan Brahmin family.
- Vishalgad of the British Raj, ruled by the Pant Prathinidhi family (Deshastha Brahmins).
- Yelandur estate of the Mysore Kingdom, ruled by a Madhwa Brahmin family.

== See also ==
- 1st Brahmans, a military regiment
- 3rd Brahmans, a military regiment
- Peshwas, rulers of the Maratha Confederacy
