= Patwardhan dynasty =

Indian dynasty

The Patwardhan Maratha princely state was established by the Patwardhan family, ruling several parts of the Maratha Empire from 1733 till 1948, when it acceded to the Dominion of India. At its peak, various branches of the dynasty controlled several Jagirs within the Maratha Empire, and later became protectorate Princely states in British India.

The branches of the dynasty, in order of creation: Kurundvad Senior (est. 1733), Miraj Senior (est. 1750), Sangli (est. 1782), Tasgaon (est. 1808), Jamkhandi (est. 1811), Miraj Junior (est. 1820), and Kurundvad Junior (est. 1854).

== History ==
The Patwardhan family were originally from the village of Kotawde in Ratnagiri, in the present-day state of Maharashtra. The patriarch of the family, Hari Bhat, was the family priest for another Chitpavan Brahmin family, the Joshi family, who served as the Chiefs of Ichalkaranji. Three of Haribhat's sons served the Peshwas and distinguished themselves during various military campaigns. They were each rewarded for their efforts with a Jagir, together covering all the land between the Tungabhadra and Krishna Rivers. Although significantly reduced in size, their Jagirs were later to be raised to the status of Princely state under the British Raj, and the Rajas of Jamkhandi, Kurundwad, Miraj, and Sangli were all lineal descendants of these Patwardhan brothers.

After the Treaty of Salbai aligned the Marathi with the British, the three Patwardhan chiefs lent their armies in the British campaign against Tipu Sultan. They gained a reputation of heroism and success in battle. Their contributions became highly valued by the British, and in 1804 Arthur Wellesley called the Patwardhans "the most ancient friends that the British Government have in the Maratha Empire" and "the most respectable of all the Peshwa's subjects properly so called".

== Bibliography ==
- Patwardhan, V. G. (1958). चित्पावन कौण्डिन्य गोत्री पटवर्धन कुलवृत्तांत [Genealogy of the Chitpavan Patwardhan Family belonging to the Kaundinya Gotra] (in Marathi). Sangli: V. G. Patwardhan. LCCN 79912249. OCLC 23868645 – via Google Books.

== See also ==
- Deccan States Agency
- List of Maratha dynasties and states
- sh India (alphabetical)
