= Madhavrao Hariharrao Patwardhan =

Madhavrao Hariharrao Patwardhan KCIE
- Raja Shrimant

5th Raja of Miraj Junior
- Reign: 1899 – 1950
- Successor: Shrimant Chintamanrao Madhavrao not Chintamanrao Dhundirao Patwardhan
- Born: 4 March 1889
- Died: 6 May 1950
- Issue: Shrimant Chintamanrao Madhavrao, Hariharrao, Appasaheb (three daughters)
- House: Patwardhan
- Religion: Hinduism

Raja Madhavrao Hariharrao Patwardhan (also known as Babasaheb Patwardhan) KCIE (4 March 1889 – 6 May 1950) was the 5th Raja of the princely state of Miraj Jr. of British Raj during the reign (1899–1950). He signed the accession to the Indian Union on 8 March 1948 which ended the separate existence of Miraj Junior state.

== Early life ==
Madhavrao Hariharrao was born to Chintamanrao Raghunathrao Patwardhan (7th ruler of Kurundvad Senior) on 4 March 1889. He succeeded Miraj Junior since the Lakshmanrao Patwardhan (4th ruler of the Miraj Junior Princely state) was Childless. Madhavrao Studied at Rajkumar college, Rajkot. He succeeded the gadi with full ruling powers on 17 March 1909. He married Thakutaisaheb daughter of Krishnarao Madhavrao titular Peshwa of Poona.

== Awards and honours ==
- In 1936, he was awarded Knights Commander of the Order of the Indian Empire (KCIE)
- On 9 June 1938, he was conferred with the title of Raja as a hereditary distinction.
- In 1911, he was awarded the Silver Coronation Delhi Durbar Medal.
