= Bhaduri =

Origin
- Origin: Bengali Hindu
- Region of origin: Bengal

Bhaduri or Bhadury (Bengali: ভাদুড়ী) is a native Bengali surname found mostly among Bengali Brahmins of India and Bangladesh. The surname belongs to the Barendra class of Bengali Kulin Brahmin caste.

== Notable people with the surname ==
- Abhijit Bhaduri, Indian author, columnist and management consultant
- Amit Bhaduri, professor of economics at Jawaharlal Nehru University (JNU)
- Arun Bhaduri (1943-2018), Indian Classical music vocalist
- Chapal Bhaduri (born 1938), Indian actor, female impersonator in Jatra Bengali theatre
- Goutam Bhaduri (born 1962), Indian judge
- Jaya Bachchan, née Bhaduri (born 1948), Indian actress and politician
- Madhuri Bhaduri (born 1958), Indian painter
- Rita Bhaduri (1955-2018), Indian actress
- Satinath Bhaduri (1906-1965), Indian Bengali novelist and politician
- Shibdas Bhaduri (1887-1932), Indian professional footballer
- Sisir Kumar Bhaduri (1889-1959), Indian actor, director, pioneer of modern Indian theatre
- Sumit Bhaduri (born 1948), Indian organometallic chemist
- Tripti Mitra, née Bahaduri (1925-1989), Indian actress
- Amar Nath Bhaduri (1935-2003), Indian chemical biologist
- Nrisingha Prasad Bhaduri (born 1950), Indian historian, writer and Indologist

== See also ==
- Bhaduri Moshai (Mr. Bhaduri), a fictional detective character of Indian Bengali poet and novelist Nirendranath Chakraborty.
