= Warana Power Co-operative =

Indian electric power cooperative

Warana Power Co-operative, legally known as Shree Tatyasaheb Kore Warana Sahakari Navashkti Sanstha Ltd. Warananagar, is a cooperative organization generating electric power from non-conventional, natural, clean energy resources, such as hydro and biomass through the co-operative sector. These members are other co-operative organizations of Warana Group. They have also proposed to generate electric energy from wind, solar, tidal and geothermal, and later from other conventional energy resources.

== Warana Group ==
Warana Group (Warana Nagar) is situated on the banks of the Warana River, and lies in a green valley about 35 kilometres (22 mi) from the city of Kolhapur and about 400 kilometres (250 mi) from Mumbai. The transformation of Warana from a barren to its current prosperous and fertile region began with the setting up of a cooperative sugar factory near the village of Kodoli in 1959. The Warana Power Co-operative idea of generating energy through co-operative organization was grown in the mind of Vinay Kore; and in January 2005, Warana Power Co-operative had been established. To start, Warana Power Co-operative took up 6 small hydropower projects form the state government of Maharashtra under the BOT (build–operate–transfer) policy.

== Hydropower projects ==
The hydropower projects, all located in Kolhapur district, Maharashtra, India, are as follows:

Project	Capacity
Chitri	1 × 2.0 MW
Kumbhi	1 × 2.5 MW
Kadavi	1 × 1.5 MW
Patagon	1 × 2.5 MW
Tulshi	2 × 0.8 MW
Jangamhatti	1 × 0.5 MW

The present total proposed power generation is 10.6 MW through hydro power.

The Warana co-generation project of 44 MW has also started under the Warana Power Co-operative, which is attached with Warana Sugar. Bagasse, a waste product of sugar cane, will be used as fuel in the co-generation plant for the 150-day crushing period of the sugar factory, and for the remaining 150 days, imported coal or biomass such as sugarcane trash, cotton stalk, and rice husk. Julie Flora is apparently known as Babool Tree in Hindi; the need to link to the actual plant name (sawdust, etc.) will be used.
