= Warana River =

River in Western India

Coordinates: 16°50′46″N 74°32′02″E

Warana

Location
- Country: India
- State: Maharashtra

Physical characteristics
- Source: Western Ghats
- Mouth: Krishna River
  - location: Sangli
- Length: 158 km (98 mi)

Basin features
- Tributaries
  - left: Morna River
  - right: Kadvi River

Warana River is a river that flows through the Warana river valley of Sangli and Kolhapur districts in the western Indian state of Maharashtra. It is an important tributary of the Krishna River.

== Geography and course ==
The river originates at a height of 914 m above sea level on Prachitgad near Patharpunj plateau in the Sahyadri mountain range. The river initially flows from northwest to southeast and then to the east. The river is about 1.5 km southwest of Sangli city, 584 m above sea level. Warana merges into Krishna river at Kothali near Sangli. The river Warana is 70 meters wide near the confluence and is prone to flooding. It has a course of total 158.029 kms.

=== Warana Valley ===
The Warana Valley covers an area of 2,095 square Kilometers and is spread over eight talukas namely Shirala, Walva, Miraj, Shahuwadi, Panhala, Hatkanangale and Shirol. The Warana Valley extends between Sangli and Kolhapur districts and its latitudinal and linear extent extends between N'16047 to N'17015 and E'73030'15" to E'74030' respectively.

Geologically, the Warana Valley falls in the northwestern part of the Deccan Traps and the basin is on the northern side of the Kolhapur District. The topography is very complex as there are different types of landforms in the river valley. The Warana Valley is located in the transition zone between the Konkan plateau to the west and the Deccan Plateau to the east. The western region of the valley is more steep than the eastern region.

Due to the Western Ghats, the valley receives less rainfall. The rivers in the Warana valley are seasonal and have very little water except during the monsoon season.

Paddy, sorghum, sugarcane, peanut are the important crops grown in this fertile river valley.

=== Dams and irrigation plans ===
Many Kolhapur type dams and some small scale irrigation projects have been completed in the Warana valley, and villages like Varanagar (Kodoli) have developed due to industry. A major irrigation project has been undertaken at Amboli in Shahuwadi taluka and at Shirala talukas in Sangli district. The project is planned to be completed in Shirala taluka on Morna river, while the Kadvi project is planned to be completed in Potfugi river in Shahuwadi taluka. There are many paved roads, district major roads and rural roads connecting the villages in this valley, but there is no railway or air transport in this valley. Kolhapur, Miraj, Sangli are the nearest railway stations to the people of this valley.

== Tributaries ==
Kadvi and Morna are the major tributaries of Warana. Kadvi river in Kolhapur district originates in the Sahyadri mountains near Amba Ghat at an altitude of about 700 meters.

The Kadvi River flows almost parallel to the Warana River. She finds Potfugee, Ambardi, Anveer and Kandra as her main streams. About 35 km away, it meets the Warana near Sarud. When the river Kadvi is met, the flow of Warana becomes very wide.

Morna is another important tributary of Warana in Sangli district. The river originates near Dhamwade hill. The river flows south and southeast. The length of this river is about 27 km. Morna valley boasts of large number of Betel farms. The river Morna meets Warana near Mangle village in Shirala taluka. On the right, Kansa river is 20 km from Udgiri. It flows to Warana near Malewadi in Panhala taluka. Sharli and Ambardi were the other tributaries of Warana.
