= William James Wanless =

Canadian surgeon and missionary

Sir William James Wanless
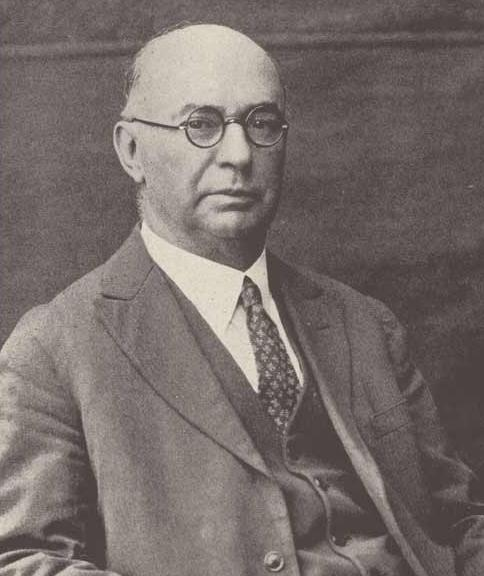
- Sir William James Wanless
- Born: May 1, 1865; Charleston (now Caledon village, Town of Caledon), Ontario, Canada
- Died: March 3, 1933 (aged 67); Glendale, California, United States
- Education: Doctor of Medicine; New York University School of Medicine
- Years active: 1894–1928
- Known for: Medical Mission in Miraj, India
- Medical career
- Profession: Surgeon & medical missionary to India
- Institutions: Wanless Hospital, Miraj
- Awards: Knight Bachelor of the British Empire

Sir William James Wanless FACS (May 1, 1865 – March 3, 1933) was a Canadian-born surgeon, humanitarian and Presbyterian missionary who founded a medical mission in Miraj, India in 1894 and led it for nearly 40 years. As part of this mission, Dr. Wanless founded Maharashtra's first missionary medical school in 1897, and helped to establish a leprosy sanatorium as well as a tuberculosis hospital, now known as the Wanless Chest Hospital.

His medical mission turned the once-small village of Miraj into a major medical center in India. By the time he retired in 1928, the clinic he started had become a 250-bed hospital with several important adjuncts. He is considered by many to be India's most famous surgeon of the 19th century, and was known throughout Asia, personally treating princes, rajahs and Mahatma Gandhi. In 1928, he was knighted by King George V, who appointed him Knight Bachelor of the British Empire, for treating 1,000,000 patients and restoring sight to 12,000 of them. The Wanless Hospital in Miraj bears his name, and is now a modern 550-bed teaching hospital.

== Early life and education ==
William James Wanless was born on May 1, 1865, to Elizabeth and John Wanless in the then-community of Charleston, Province of Canada (now "Caledon Village", part of Caledon, Ontario, Canada.) He was the sixth of 14 children, including two elder brothers who died in childhood. His father, born in Barrow, Alwinton, Northumberland, England (or possibly Jedboro, Scotland) on December 30, 1832, emigrated to the United States with his family at the age of 17, later emigrating to Canada where he variously became a railroader, a hardware store owner (John Wanless & Sons), and a home heating furnace manufacturer in Toronto (where Wanless Park and several streets are named after one of their distant relations, also a John Wanless, a municipal alderman and educator). During his childhood and adolescence, William was educated in the schools of Charleston, Mount Forest and Guelph, Ontario.

He graduated from the New York University School of Medicine in 1889. He married Mary Elizabeth Marshall on September 5, 1889, in Canada, and sailed for India the same year. Mary gave birth to Ethel at Miraj on Dec 2, 1891. Mary died on August 12, 1906. On December 5, 1907, Dr William married again at Kodoli to Lillian Emery Havens, who survived him. Lillian gave birth to 3 children: Harold L. Wanless on October 2, 1908, at Miraj; Robert Emery Wanless who became a Pan Am Boeing pilot and Margaret Elizabeth Wanless on August 24, 1917, in Toronto. Lillian later wrote his biography.

Wanless was a delegate to the 1910 World Missionary Conference held in Edinburgh, Scotland, and was president of the Missionary Medical Association of India from 1911 to 1928. In 1918 he was made a Fellow of the American College of Surgeons. He was erroneously reported as dead in 1922; the incorrect report and its subsequent retraction made headlines in the United States.

== Mission in India ==
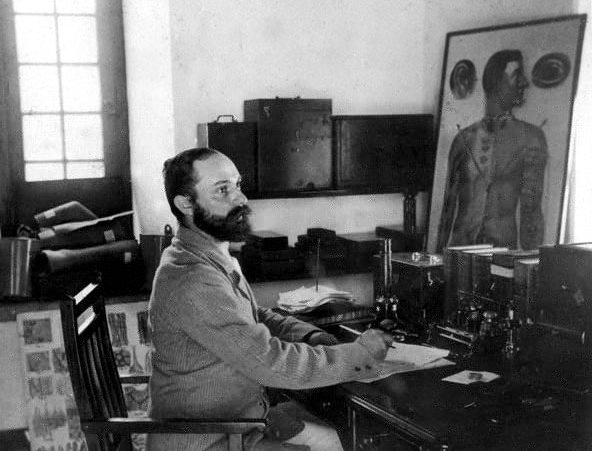
William Wanless, age 23, at the New York University School of Medicine, ca.1888.

The Bryn Mawr Presbyterian Church, of Bryn Mawr, Pennsylvania, sent Dr. Wanless to India in 1889. In 1891, he selected the rustic town of Miraj in Maharashtra State for the mission hospital. The Mission was started as a one-room dispensary in a very small rented place at a busy bazaar, and he was assisted by his wife, Mary, a trained nurse. The Rajah of Miraj, Rajah Sir Gangadharrao Ganesh (Bala Saheb) Patwardhan, provided him with land for a hospital which was formally opened in 1894, in a part of the city now known as Wanlesswadi.

With the establishment of a hospital, the need for higher quality medical care was increasingly felt, and towards that end a School of Nursing was founded in 1897 under the superintendence of Miss Elizabeth Foster. It has since steadily developed into one of the best nursing schools in Maharashtra.

The Mary Wanless Hospital was founded in memory of Wanless's first wife Mary after her death in 1906. Now called the Mary Wanless Hospital / Miraj Medical Centre, it still attracts hundreds of poor and needy patients from across India and abroad. He established the Miraj Christian Medical School in 1907, which later graduated its first group of 17 students, with its only qualified teacher being Wanless himself. In 1917 the medical school was recognized for a Diploma of Licentiate by the College of Physicians and Surgeons of Mumbai (LCPS), similar to the LRCP of the Royal College of Surgeons (MRCS) of England.

Wanless established a Tuberculosis Sanatorium in 1920. At the time of his retirement in 1928, money was raised by citizens and his friends to erect a new building called the Wanless Tuberculosis Sanatorium, now known as Wanless Chest Hospital. It is one of the premier institutions in the country.

The Vail Memorial Cancer Institute, named after Dr. Charles E. Vail who joined Wanless three years later, and the Goheen Psychiatric Clinic were started in 1937 and 1955 respectively. The Goheen Clinic was named after Dr. Robert H. H. Goheen, father of Robert Francis Goheen, These facilities have effectively served the purposes for which they were established, that is in providing quality health care to all irrespective of caste, creed, religion or financial means.

Additionally, Wanless established five outpost stations attached to the hospital, and paid the hospital's staff of 125, living only on his missionary's salary sent by the Bryn Mawr Presbyterian Church, while donating his personal staff salary to the mission.

=== Retirement and legacy ===
In 1928, after almost forty years of medical missionary service in India, Wanless retired to live in the United States. He wrote a book, Medicine in India, on his life as a doctor in India. He died at his home, 1016 Matillja Street, Glendale, California, on March 3, 1933, and was buried at Forest Lawn Memorial Park in the same city. His wife Lillian died in 1973 at the age of 99 at their home in Glendale, California. Wanless's son Harold later carried on his father's tradition by studying medicine at the University of Toronto.

Since its inception over 115 years ago his medical mission has grown into an institution consisting of a 550-bed teaching hospital affiliated with India's Government Medical College, a College of Nursing, an Institute of Pharmacy and various paramedical programmes.

The Wanless Hospital and Wanless Chest Hospital are now located in the township of 'Wanlesswadi', that is 'Wanless town', made notable for its medical institutions. The name was given it by its citizens in that part of India and is recognized by the federal government of India. Wanlesswadi has its own Postal Index Number, 416414, and the Indian Railways also has a station named 'Wanlesswadi' on its Miraj–Sangli Route, which opened on April 1, 1907, for the use by ill or needy patients from across India and from abroad.

As a secondary and tertiary care centre, Wanless Hospital serves a large part of western Maharashtra and North Karnataka.

== Honours ==
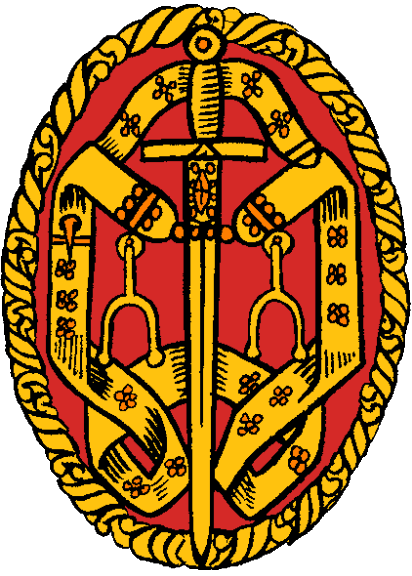
The badge of a Knight Bachelor

Dr. Wanless received official honors from Great Britain on three occasions:

- He first received the silver Kaisar-i-Hind (Emperor in India) medal of second class in 1912.
- The same order of gold medal of first class in 1920, in recognition of his philanthropic and humanitarian work for India.
- The third honor was bestowed upon him on January 2, 1928, by His Majesty, George V of the United Kingdom, was a knighthood of the British Empire, conferring upon him the degree and honor.

The Sultan Mahommed Shah, Aga Khan III presented him a silver casket with a farewell address on his retirement.

== Publications ==
A partial list of his writings and works includes:

- Wanless, William James (January 7, 1928). "Cancer of the Uterus". The British Medical Journal. 1 (3496): 21–25 [24]. doi:10.1136/bmj.1.3496.21. JSTOR 25327510. S2CID 219995353. (subscription required).
- Wanless, William James (January 3, 1920). "Intramuscular Injections of Quinine". The British Medical Journal. 1 (3079): 21–27 [25–26]. doi:10.1136/bmj.1.3079.21. JSTOR 20339668. S2CID 219996695. (subscription required).
- Wanless, William James (January 7, 1928). "Iodine, Goitre, and Growth". The British Medical Journal. 1 (3496): 21–25 [24]. doi:10.1136/bmj.1.3496.21. JSTOR 25327509. S2CID 219995353. (subscription required).
- Wanless, William James (February 1930). "Medicine in India". Bull N Y Acad Med. 6 (2): 105–25. PMC 2095951. PMID 19311713. Origin: delivered before the Section of Historical and Cultural Medicine, November 13, 1929.

As cited in other works

- Wanless, William James. "The Medical Mission", 1898.
- Wanless, William James. "Medical Missions: Facts and Testimonies".
- Wanless, William James. "An American Doctor at Work in India", New York, 1932.

== Archival collections ==
The Presbyterian Historical Society in Philadelphia, Pennsylvania, has Sir W. J. Wanless' Papers, including Dr. Wanless' correspondence, notes and diaries, scrapbooks, and photographs of the mission hospital work.
