= Warana =

Warana may refer to:

- Warana, Maharashtra, India
- Warana, Queensland, Australia

== See also ==
- Warana Raja Maha Vihara, an ancient Buddhist temple in Thihariya, Gampaha District, Sri Lanka
