= Kaljawade =

Village in Maharashtra

- city
- Location in Maharashtra, India
- Coordinates: 16.42°N 73.57°E
- Country: India
- State: Maharashtra
- District: Kolhapur
  - Rank: area_total_km2
- Elevation: 553 m (1,814 ft)

Population
  - Total: 1,171

Languages
  - Official: Marathi
- Time zone: UTC+5:30 (IST)
- PIN: 416205
- Telephone code: 02328

Kaljawade is a village in the Kolhapur district of Maharashtra, India.

== Geography ==
Kaljawade is located at the boundary of the towns of Shahuwadi and Gaganbawada, near the Kaljawade Jambhali River.

== Demographics ==
Kaljawade total population is 1171 with 585 male and 586 female.

Kaljawade Panchayat code number 180709
