= Mangoba =

Manqoba is a common first name for males from the South African tribe, "Ama-Zulu", who speak the language called IsiZulu. The name "Manqoba" is commonly found in the KwaZulu-Natal province in South Africa. The name gained its popularity between the early 80's and the late 90's. In the millennium, the popularity of the name began to decrease.

Most people around the world would find a challenge in pronouncing the name as it requires a distinct twist of the tongue when saying it. In the name, there is a "qo" phonic which is uncommon in many languages around the world and can be very challenging for people who do not speak any of the Nguni languages as it requires an unusual twisting of the tip of the tongue against the inner top of part of the mouth to emit a distinct click sound that can only be mastered with determined practice. Owing to the difficulty of the pronunciation of the name, it is common to find people mispronouncing it as "Man-ko-ba" or "Man-go-ba".

In the Philippines it is an indigenous surname. It is not known if the name has a meaning in any of the numerous languages and dialects of the Philippines, and the name is not found in local dictionaries. It is commonly pronounced by Filipinos as "Ma-ngo-ba". or "Mang-GOH-buh".

In history, Mangoba is a name of a regiment in pre-colonial Zimbabwe, formerly Rhodesia. The regiment had a role in the Shona rising of 1896, the first outbreak of rebellion against European rule.

In India, Mangoba is the name of a God worshipped by the Mangs. The Mang community, a sub-classof the Dalit, formerly known as "Untouchables," is one of India's minority groups in the Hindu caste system of ranking people according to social status. A Mangoba temple can be found at Kodoli in the state of Maharashtra.
