= Kurundwad =

Kurundwad Kurandwad
- town
- Location in Maharashtra, India
- Coordinates: 16.691612°N 74.591821°E
- Country: India
- State: Maharashtra
- District: Kolhapur

Population (2001)
  - Total: 21,325

Languages
  - Official: Marathi
- Time zone: UTC+5:30 (IST)

Kurundwad is a town on the banks of the Panchganga river, 55 km from Kolhapur (Kolhapur district) in the Indian state of Maharashtra.

== Geography ==
It is in the southern part of the Indian state of Maharashtra. It is 55 km from the district headquarters of Kolhapur and lies 2 km from the Shri Dattatrey devotee town of Narsobachi Wadi.

Kurundwad is situated near the banks of two rivers, Krishna and Panchaganga. Near Krishna river lies Kurundwad Ghat, built by Raja Raghunathrao I Dadasaheb Patwardhan around 1795. A samadhi (memorial) of Santajiraje Ghorapade, who was Commander-in-Chief of Maratha forces that humbled Aurangzeb during the reign of Chhatrapati Rajaram (1689–1700).

== Transport ==
The nearest railway station is in Jaysingpur, approximately 15 km to the north.

== Culture ==
Popular regional sports include Kabbadi, weight lifting and Kho Kho.

== History ==
Princely flag of Kurundwad Junior

During the British Raj, the area of Kurundwad was a native state, falling under the Deccan States Agency of the Bombay Presidency. It formed part of the southern Mahratta jagirs.

Created in 1772 by a grant from the Peshwa, the state was later divided into two parts, including "Shedbal", which lapsed to the British government in 1857. In 1855, the remaining state area of Kurundwad was further divided into a senior branch, Kurundvad Senior, with an area of 185 miles², and a junior branch, Kurundvad Junior, with an area of 114 miles². The territory of both was widely scattered among other native states and British districts. According to the 1901 census, the senior branch had a population of 42,474, while the junior branch had a population of 34,003.

The chiefs of the branches were Brahmans by caste, belonging to the Patwardhan family. The last ruler (junior line) was Raja Shrimant Raghunathrao Ganpatrao (Dadasaheb) Patwardhan. He was ADC to the 1st President of India, recipient of the Independence Medal, recipient of King George V Silver Jubilee Medal and the King George VI Coronation Medal [Hereditary Distinction].

== Legacy ==
Raja Shrimant Bhalchandrarao II Chintamanrao Patwardhan, Raja of Kurundwad-Snr, ranks as a sardar in the southern Maratha country.

== Demographics ==
The "Kurundwad Municipal Council" has population of 22,372 of which 11,325 are males while 11,047 are females as per report released by "Census India 2011".

The population of children aged 0-6 is 2267 which is 10.13% of total population of Kurundwad (M Cl). In Kurundwad Municipal Council, the female sex ratio is 975 against state average of 929. Moreover, the child sex ratio in Kurundwad is around 802 compared to Maharashtra state average of 894. literacy rate of Kurundwad city is 86.90% higher than the state average of 82.34%. In Kurundwad, male literacy is around 92.81% while the female literacy rate is 80.97%.

Marathi is the official and most widely spoken language there.

== Schools ==
- Sitabai Patwardhan High School, Kurundwad.
- Dr. Allama Iqbal High School and Junior College, Kurundwad.
- Sane Guruji Vidyalaya, Kurundwad.
- Sou. Vimaladevi Khanderao Mane Kanya Madhyamik Vidyalaya, Kurundwad.
- Prathamik Vidya Mandir, Kurundwad.
- Sanjeevani English Medium School, Kurundwad.
- Sainiki Pattern Niwasi Shala, Kurundwad.
- Abhinav Prathamik Shala, Kurundwad.
- Kumar Vidya Mandir No.1, Kurundwad.
- Kumar Vidya Mandir No.2, Kurundwad.
- Kumar Vidya Mandir No.3, Kurundwad.
- Kanya Vidya Mandir No.1, Kurundwad.
- Kanya Vidya Mandir No.2, Kurundwad.

== Notable people ==
- Vishnu Digambar Paluskar - Hindustani classical vocalist
- Ringmaster Vishnupant Chhatre - Circus inventor of India

== See also ==
- Maratha
- Maratha Empire
- List of Maratha dynasties and states
- List of Indian princely states
