= Bryn Mawr Presbyterian Church =

Coordinates: 40.0220°N 75.3113°W

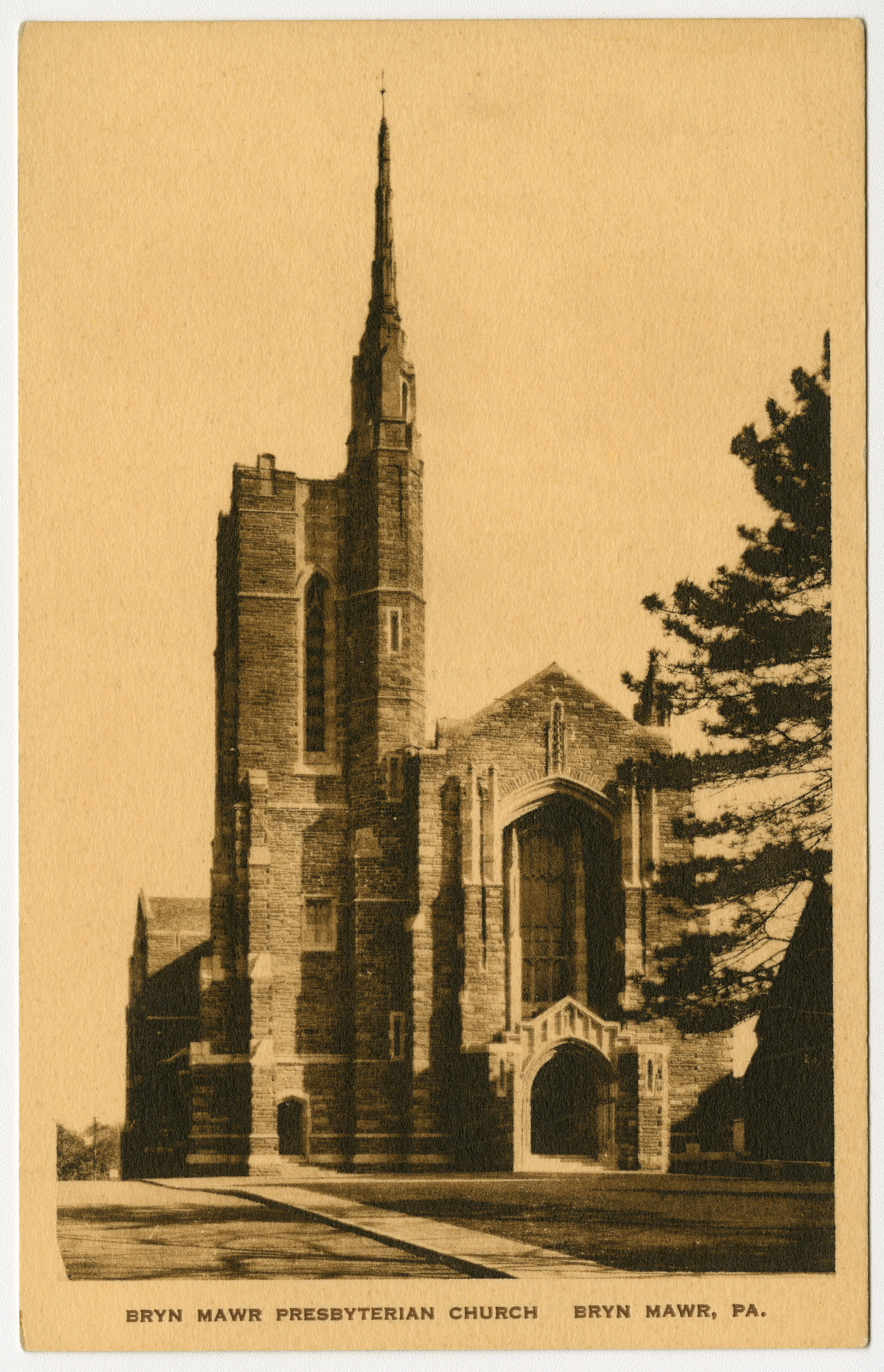
- Bryn Mawr Presbyterian Church post-1927
- Bryn Mawr Presbyterian Church
- Location: 625 Montgomery Avenue, Bryn Mawr, Pennsylvania 19010
- Country: United States
- Language: English
- Denomination: Presbyterian

History
- Status: Open
- Founded: 1873

Architecture
- Functional status: Active

Clergy
- Pastor(s): The Rev. Rebecca Kirpatrick; The Rev. Rachel Pedersen; The Rev. Melanie Hardison; The Rev. Andrew Greenhow

Bryn Mawr Presbyterian Church is a church in Bryn Mawr, Pennsylvania; founded in 1873, it is currently a 2,500 member church of the PC(USA). It is located on the Main Line, just west of Philadelphia. Being a large congregation, the church is active seven days a week.

Worship in Bryn Mawr Presbyterian Church is traditional: the architecture includes stained glass windows, and the music is provided by a pipe organ and choir

Besides worship on Sunday mornings, the congregation takes part in a variety of opportunities for faith enrichment, education, fellowship, and outreach on behalf of others. The church's theology is inclusive and emphasizes diversity, receiving people regardless of race, ethnic origin, sexual orientation, or socioeconomic status.

== Notable members ==
- U.S. President Woodrow Wilson was a member of this church while he served on the faculty at nearby Bryn Mawr College.
- The church sponsored the 40-year-long medical mission to India by Dr. William James Wanless.

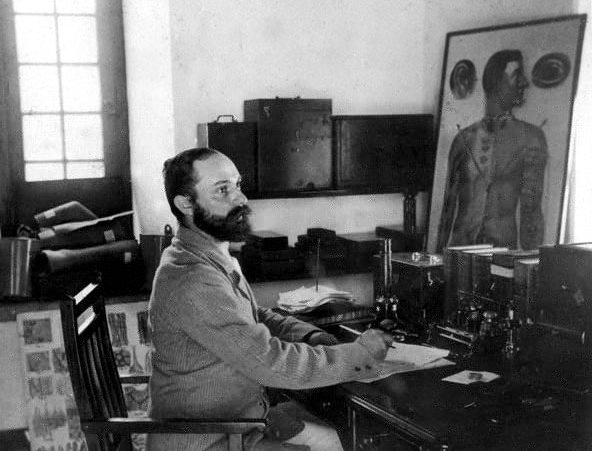
Dr. Wiliam James Wanless circa 1888, likely at the New York University School of Medicine

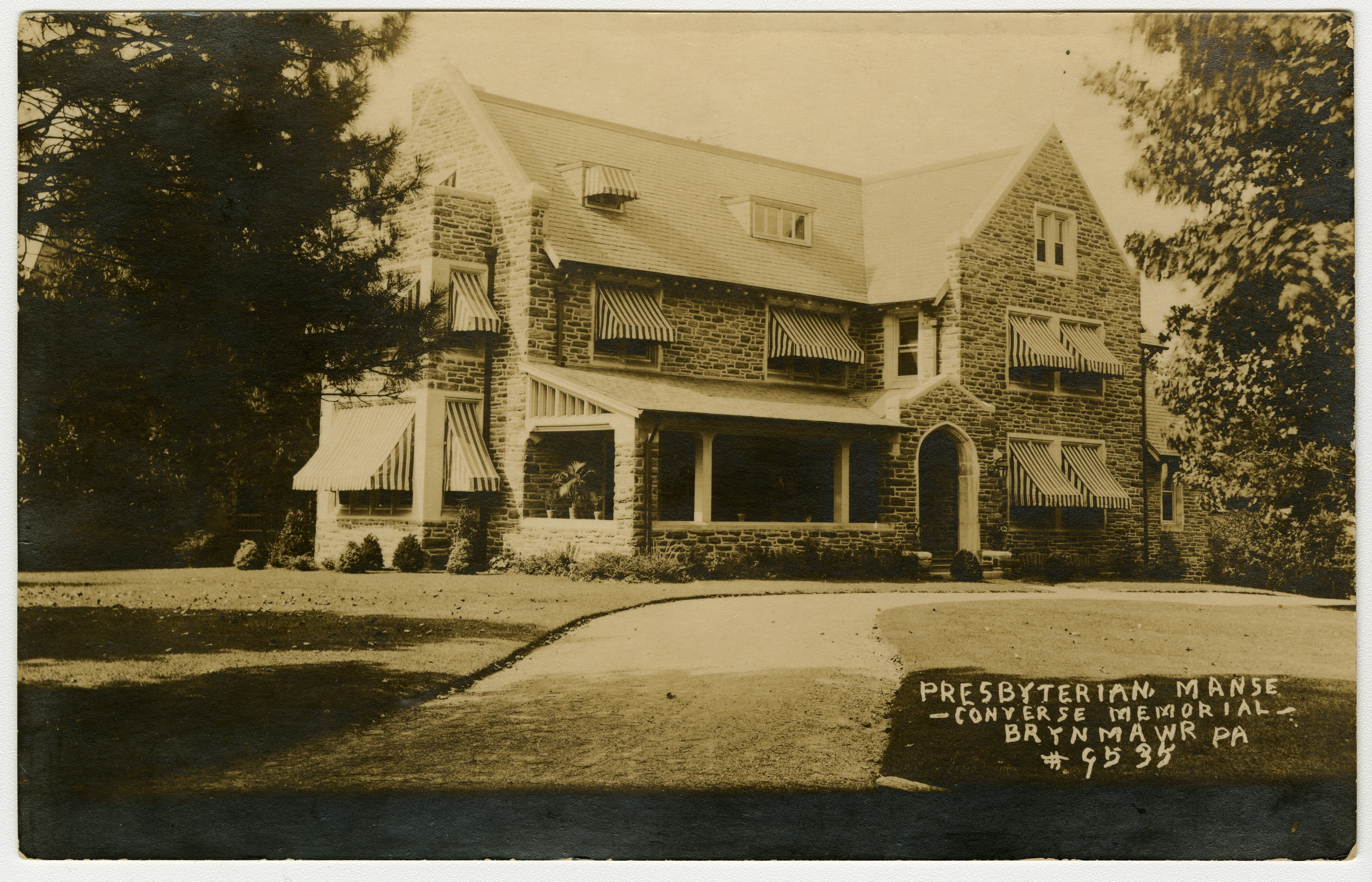
Bryn Mawr Presbyterian Church Manse pre-1923

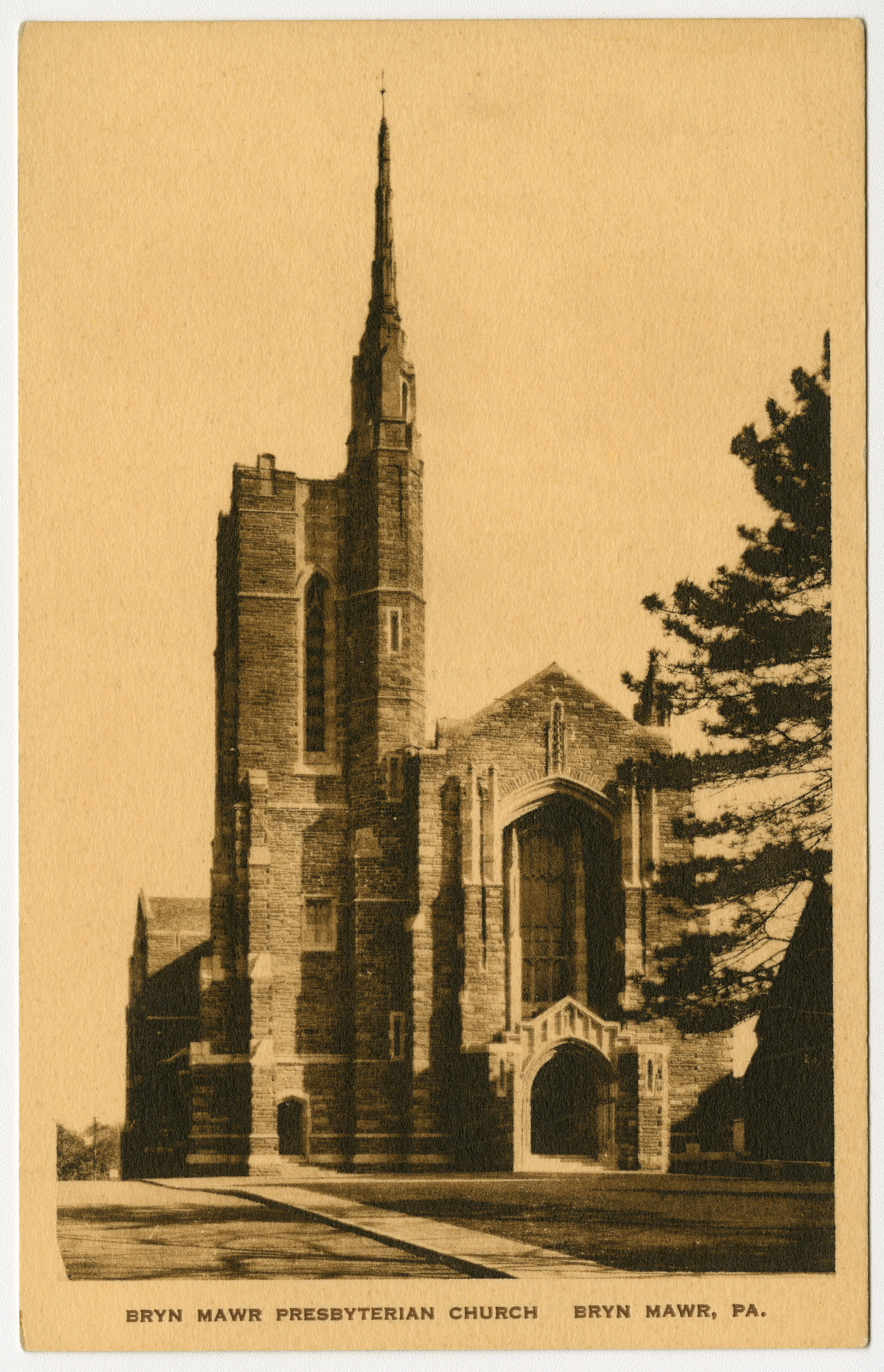
Bryn Mawr Presbyterian Church pre-1923

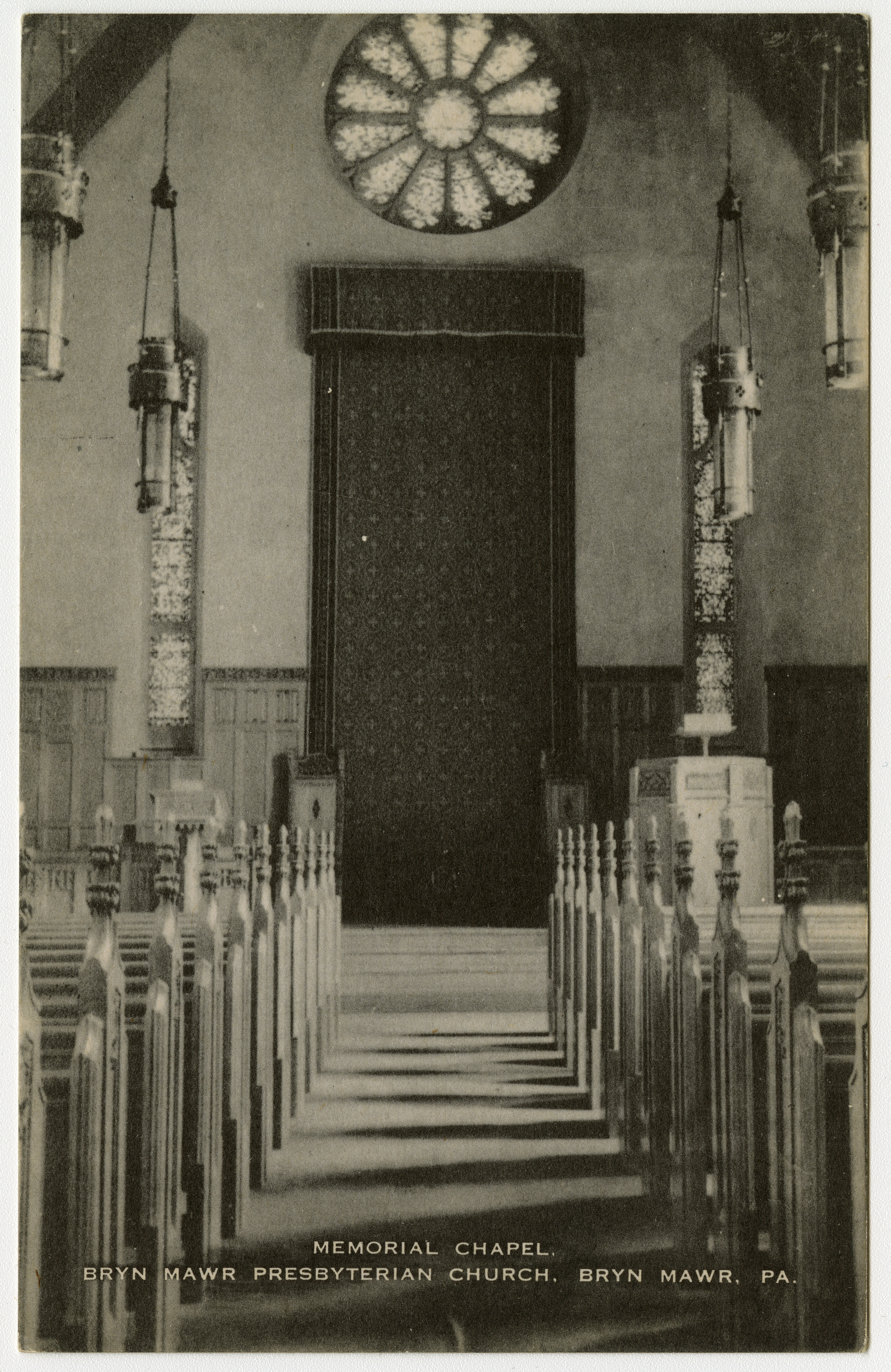
Bryn Mawr Presbyterian Church Chapel pre-1923

== Publications ==
=== Bryn Mawr Presbyterian Church ===
- The Story of Bryn Mawr Presbyterian Church by Rex Stowers Clements in celebration of the 75th anniversary of the church. Published in 1948.
- Bon Appetit Bryn Mawr Presbyterian Community Cookbook. Published in 1966
- Spirit of a Century - 100 Years of the Bryn Mawr Presbyterian Church by Hugh Best in celebration of the 100th anniversary of the church. Published in 1973.

==== Pastor authored: ====
===== Rev. Dr. David B. Watermulder =====
- Proclamation: Aids for Interpreting the Lessons of the Church Year by David B. Watermulder and Gerhard A. Krodel. Published in 1973.
- Pastoral Prayers for the People of God: An Anthology of Classic Pulpit Prayers by the Reverend Dr. David B. Watermulder edited by Paul Watermulder and Martha Watermulder. Published in 2017.

== Burials ==
=== Current ===
Currently, there is no traditional burial grounds maintained by the church. However, Bryn Mawr Presbyterian Church in the late 1970s explored and in 1980 opened an outdoor columbarium contained within the Church property for disposition of cremated remains.

== Pastors ==
Pastors of Bryn Mawr Presbyterian Church
Image		Pastor (Called)	Years	Other Pastors (Supply, Interim, Associate, Student, etc.)
	1	The Rev. William H. Miller	1873-1906	
	2		1906-1912	
	3	The Rev. Dr. Andrew Mutch Spouse: Petrice Dow Young	1912-1936	
	4	The Rev. Rex Clements	1936-1962	
	5	The Rev. Dr. David Brainard Watermulder Spouse: Ruth Gullyes	1962-1986	The Rev. Dr. George Bryant Wirth (1972-1977); The Rev. Barbara A. Chaapel (Valentine) (1977-1981)
	6	The Rev. Eugene C. Bay	1987-2006	The Rev. Adan A. Mairena (2003-2005); The Rev. George Hollingshead; The Rev Patricia M.B. Kitchen
	7	The Rev. Dr. Wesley Avram Spouse: Lynne Avram	2006-2009	The Rev. Robert McClellen (2007-2010)
		The Rev. James Leighton Carter (Interim)	2010-2012	The Rev. Robert McClellen (2007-2010); The Rev. Kellen A. Smith; The Rev. Jacqui Van Vilet; The Rev. Susan Rice; The Rev. Elizabeth Lovell; The Rev. R. Charles Grant (-2014); The Rev. Sherri Hausser (-2013); The Rev. Louisa Watkins-Umphress; The Rev. Joanne Fong
		The Rev. R. Charles Grant (Interim)	2012-2013	The Rev. Kellen A. Smith; The Rev. Jacqui Van Vilet (-2014); The Rev. Susan Rice; The Rev. Elizabeth Lovell; The Rev. Sherri Hausser (-2013); The Rev. Louisa Watkins-Umphress; The Rev. Joanne Fong
	8	The Rev. Dr. Agnes W. Norfleet Spouse: Larry Arney	2013-2025	The Rev. R. Charles Grant (-2014); The Rev. Dr. Nicole Duran (2013-2014); The Rev. Richard Wohlschlaeger; The Rev. Mary Steege; The Rev. David B. Smith; The Rev. Andrew H. Mann, Jr.; The Rev. Rachel Pedersen (2014-; The Rev. Rebecca Kirkpatrick (2015-; The Rev. Franklyn C. Pottorff (2017-2024); The Rev. Leigh DeVires (2019-2024); The Rev. Brian Ballard (2019-2023); The Rev. Kirby Lawrence Hill (2023-2025); The Rev. Andrew Greenhow (2024-; The Rev. Melanie Hardison (2025-
	9	The Rev. Dr. John M. Willingham (Interim)	2025-	The Rev. Rachel Pedersen (2014-; The Rev. Rebecca Kirkpatrick (2015-; The Rev. Andrew Greenhow (2024-; The Rev. Melanie Hardison (2025-
