= Dargah of Meerasaheb, Miraj =

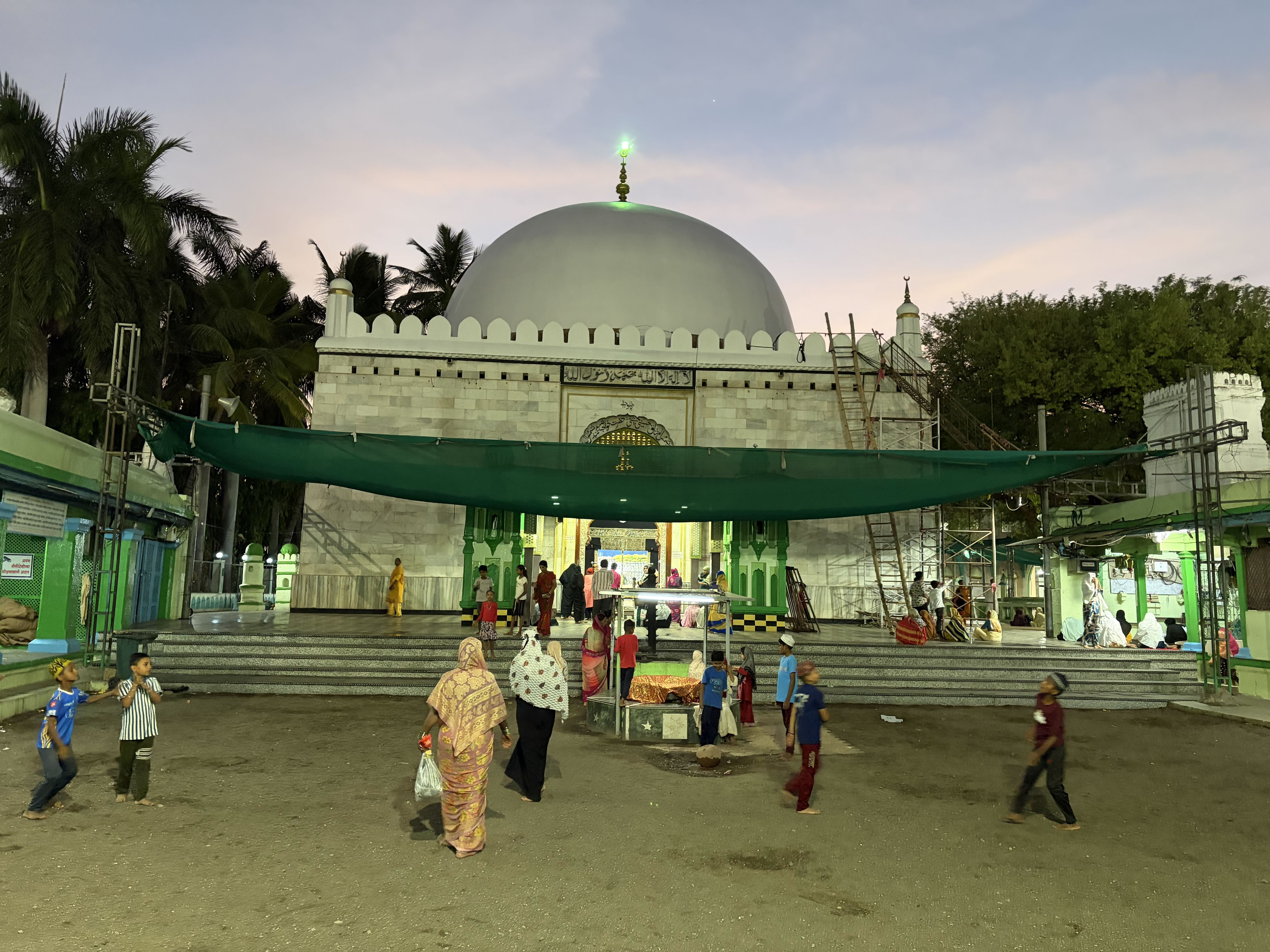
An evening at the Meerasaheb Dargah, Miraj

The Meerasaheb Dargah is located in Miraj, in the Sangli district of Maharashtra, India. It is about 700 meters from the Miraj Railway Station. The dargah is dedicated to Hazarat Meerasaheb, a Sufi saint who came to India from Saudi Arabia, and his son Hazarat Shamsuddin Hussein. It is a common site of worship of both Hindu and Islamic communities in Miraj. The dargah complex contains a Hindu mandir, a mosque, and a vegetable garden.

The dargah is also known as the final burial spot of Ustad Abdul Karim Khan, the founder of the Kirana gharana in Indian Classical music, and his third wife. Abdul Karim Khan fell ill on the way to the Mysore durbar and got off the train to get medical help. When he found this dargah, he started singing there and decided to settle down in Miraj.

This religious place in Miraj is a popular attraction. Every year URS is celebrated and includes a music festival featuring performance by well-known musicians.
