= Miraj Junior =

Maratha princely state, 1820–1948

Coordinates: 16.818673°N 74.641405°E

Miraj State (ca. 1750 - 1820) Miraj Junior State (1820 - 1948)
- State Within the Maratha Confederacy (1750 - 1818); Princely State of British India
- 1820–1948
- Flag

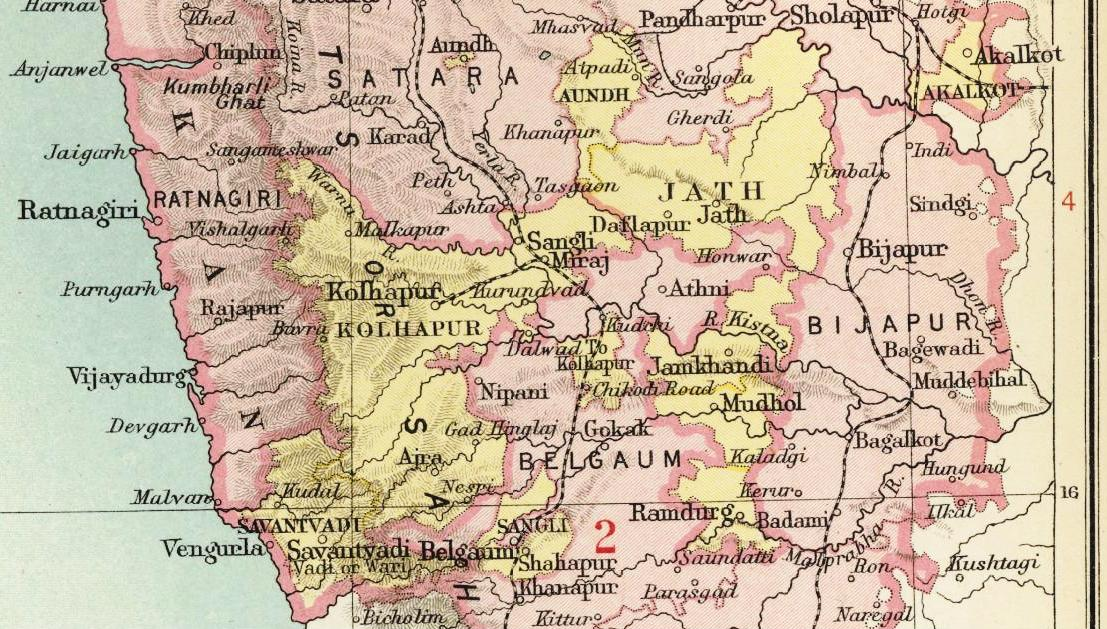
- Miraj in the Imperial Gazetteer of India
- Area
  - 1901: 508 km^{2} (196 sq mi)
- Population
  - 1901: 35,806
- History
  - Established: 1820
  - Independence of India: 1948
Preceded by	Succeeded by
Maratha Empire	India

Miraj Junior was one of two Maratha princely states during the British Raj: 'Miraj Senior' and Miraj Junior. The two states separated in 1820. It was under the southern division of the Bombay Presidency, forming part of the southern Mahratta Jagirs, and later the Deccan States Agency.

Miraj Junior measured 211 square miles (550 km^{2}) in area. According to the 1901 census, the population was 35,806. In 1901, the state enjoyed revenue estimated at £27,000, and paid £400 in tribute to the British Raj. The Raja resided in the town of Bhudgaon (population 3,591 in 1901).

== History ==
The State of Miraj, the predecessor state, was founded before 1750 and within its limits was the former capital of the State of Sangli before the British Raj. Raja Govind Rao Patwardhan, 1st Ruler of Miraj, began as a cavalry commander. He distinguished himself in several expeditions against the Nizam of Hyderabad and Hyder Ali of Mysore, established the Maratha ascendancy in southern India and pushed the Maratha conquests to the frontier of Mysore.

In 1820, the state of Miraj was divided between a Senior and Junior branch. The territory of both branches was widely scattered among other native states and also British districts.

Miraj Junior acceded to the Dominion of India on 8 March 1948 and is currently a part of Maharashtra state.

=== Rulers ===
The rulers belonged to the Patwardhan dynasty and used the title of Raja. They were of the same clan that ruled nearby Jamkhandi State.

==== Rajas ====
- Raja Madhavrao I Patwardhan, 1st Raja of Miraj Junior 1820/1845
- Raja Lakshmanrao I [Anna Saheb] Patwardhan, 2nd Raja of Miraj Junior 1845/1876, born 1807, died 1876.
- Raja Hariharrao II [Dada Saheb] Patwardhan, 3rd Raja of Miraj Junior 1876/1877, died 1877.
- Raja Lakshmanrao II [Anna Saheb] Patwardhan, 4th Raja of Miraj Junior 1877/1899, died 7 February 1899.
- Meherban Shrimant Raja Sir Madhavrao II Harihar Babasaheb Patwardhan, 5th Raja of Miraj Junior 1899/1950

The line is nominally continued:

- Meherban Shrimant Raja Chintamanrao II Madhavrao Balasaheb Patwardhan, 6th Raja of Miraj Junior 1950/1972
- Rajkumar Shrimant Vasant Raje Patwardhan
- Rajkumari Yamuna Vasant Naykude
- Yuvaraj Shrimant Agastyanand Patwardhan
- Meherban Shrimant Raja Hariharrao III Madhavrao Babasaheb Patwardhan, Raja of Miraj Junior
- Meherban Shrimant Raja Parshuramrao Hariharrao Patwardhan

== See also ==
- Maratha Empire
- List of Maratha dynasties and states
- Political integration of India
