= Maitra =

Origin
- Origin: Bengali Hindu
- Region of origin: Bengal

Maitra (Bengali: মৈত্র), alternatively spelled as Moitra or Maitreya is a Bengali Hindu surname found mostly among the Bengali Kulin Brahmins of Barendra clan.

== History ==
The Maitra surname has deep roots in ancient Bengal. It is one of the Kulin Brahmin surnames, the others being Sanyal, Bhaduri, Bagchi, Lahiri etc. The Maitras, occupied a high social and intellectual status in Bengal’s caste hierarchy.

Historical records from the medieval period mention Maitras as landowners, physicians, and administrators in various parts of Bengal. During the Bengal Renaissance (19th century), several Maitra families became influential in education, literature, and social reform.

== Notables ==
- Sisir Kumar Maitra (1887–1963), Indian philosopher
- Radhika Mohan Maitra (1917–1981), Indian sarod player
- Shantanu Moitra (born 1968), Indian music director
- Krishnananda Agamavagisha, Moitra at birth, Bengali scholar
- Mahua Moitra (born 1974), Indian politician and member of parliament
- Sunil Maitra (1 February 1927 – 18 September 1996), Indian politician and member of parliament

== See also ==
- Maitrī, a Buddhist philosophy
