= Miraj =

City in the Sangli District, Maharashtra, India

- City
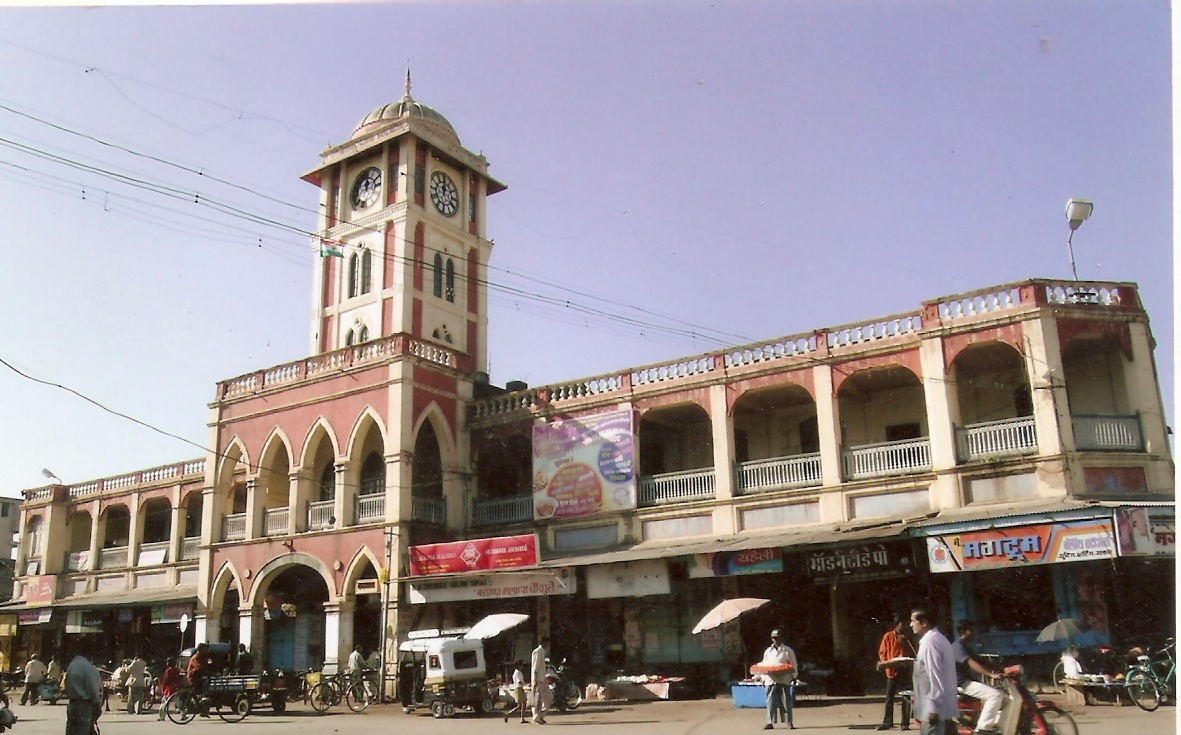
- Laxmi Market in Miraj

- Location within Maharashtra
- Coordinates: 16.83°N 74.63°E
- Country: India
- State: Maharashtra
- District: Sangli

Government
  - Type: Municipal corporation
  - Body: Sangli, Miraj and Kupwad City Municipal Corporation (SMKC)
  - Mayor: Digvijay Suryavanshi (NCP)
- Demonym: Mirajkar

Languages
  - Official: Marathi
- Time zone: UTC+5:30 (IST)
- PIN: 416410
- Telephone Code: 0233
- Vehicle registration: MH-10

Miraj (Pronunciation: [miɾəd͡z];) is a city that is part of the Sangli-Miraj-Kupwad metropolitan region in the Sangli district, Maharashtra, India. Founded in the early 10th century, Miraj was an important jagir of the Bijapur Sultanate.

Chhatrapati Shivaji Maharaj, the founder of the Maratha Empire, stayed in Miraj for two months during his south India campaign. It was the capital of Miraj Senior and a vital junction on the central railway network. The Patwardhan family were the hereditary rulers of Miraj until independence.

Miraj is known for medical tourism.

== History ==
=== Shilahara (1000 to 1216) ===
At the end of the 9th century, the Shilaharas of Kolhapur gained control of Miraj. In 1024, the city was ruled by Narasimha of the Shilahar dynasty. Jatiga II (c. 1000–1020), the fourth Shilahar ruler, appears in the records of his son, Narasimha (c. 1050–1075). Jatiga II was succeeded by his son Gonka, who has been described in inscriptions as the conqueror of Karahata (Karad), Miraj, and Konkan. The Shilaharas were able to retain control of Miraj despite nearby military action by Chavan-raja, a general of Western Chalukya King Jayasimha II.

=== Yadavas and Bahmanis (1216 to 1347) ===
In 1216, Miraj, along with other Shilahara territory, was conquered by the Yadavas of Devagiri. In 1318, the Bahmanis gained control. The historian Tazkirat-ul-Mulk reported that Hasan Gangu, the founder of the Bahmani dynasty, was in the employ of the Shaikh Muhammad Junaidi at Gangi near Miraj. Hasan found a treasure with which he raised an army, and marched on Miraj. He defeated and imprisoned Rani Durgavati, the subedar of Miraj, and captured the town's fort. At the behest of Shaikh Muhammad, the name of the town was changed to Mubarakabad in 1347 (748 AH). In 1395, the Bahmanis conquered Miraj. Between 1391 and 1403, Miraj was affected by the Durga Devi famine. From 1423, Malik Imad Ul Mulk ruled Miraj. 1494 was the year of Bahadur Khan Gilani's rebellion. For two months in 1660, Shivaji and Adilshah battled for control of Miraj.

=== Fall of the Bahmani Empire ===
The power of the Bahmani rulers waned under the influence of powerful provincial governors. In 1490, the rule of Miraj passed to the Sultanate of Bijapur. During the later years of his reign, Ibrahim Adil Shah I (1534–1558) kept his son, Ali Adil Shah I (1558–1580), under house arrest in Miraj. On Ibrahim's death in 1580, Miraj became an assembly point for Ali's troops in his assuming the throne. Subsequently, the troops of Miraj fought with Ismail against Ibrahim Adil Shah II.

=== Rise of the Maratha Empire ===
On 28 November 1659, within 18 days of Bijapur General Afzal Khan's death at Pratapgad, the western Adil Sahi district was surrendered to Annaji Datto (Shivaji's finance minister). Unlike other towns, the Miraj fort resisted. Shivaji, who was encamped at Kolhapur, sent Netaji Palkar to besiege Miraj. In January 1660, Shivaji arrived to personally command the three-month-long ongoing siege. However, news of attacks by Siddi Johar and Fazal Khan caused him to return to Panhala. The siege of Miraj was abandoned and negotiations began. Under the rule of Sambhaji, the Maratha Empire generals Santaji Ghorpade and Dhanaji Jadhav chose Miraj as a safe place for their families while they conducted guerrilla actions against the invading forces of Aurangzeb of the Mughal Empire.

=== Mughal Empire ===
In 1687, Bijapur was conquered by the Mughals. Santaji Ghorpade became Deshmukh of Miraj in 1680 and Aurangzeb captured the town six years later. In 1730, Maratha Chhatrapati Shahu of Satara ordered Pant Pratinidhi to attack the town. Miraj remained under Mughal rule until 3 October 1739, when it was captured by Shahu after a military campaign of two years, reflecting the fall of the last defences of the Mughals. In 1761, Harbhat Patwardhan's son, Gopalrao, took the Miraj jagir from Peshwa Madhavrao.

=== British Raj ===
The Patwardhan dynasty ruled Miraj as the capital of a principality, overseen by British rule. Miraj was part of the southern division of the Bombay Presidency which in turn was part of the southern Maratha jagirs, and later the Deccan States Agency. In 1820, the state of Miraj was divided into Miraj Senior and Miraj Junior. The territory of both regions was distributed among other native states and British districts. The area of Miraj Senior was 339 square miles (880 km^{2}). In 1901, its population was 81,467. Its revenue was £23,000 and the tax paid to the British was £800. The population of the town of Miraj in 1901 was 18,425. It lay on a junction of the Southern Mahratta Railway.

=== Independence ===
On 8 March 1948, Miraj Senior acceded to the Dominion of India, and the city became part of the Republic of India. Since 1960, it has been part of the state of Maharashtra.

== Climate ==
Climate data for Miraj (1981–2010, extremes 1968–2010)
Month	Jan	Feb	Mar	Apr	May	Jun	Jul	Aug	Sep	Oct	Nov	Dec	Year
Record high °C (°F)	36.1 (97.0)	40.0 (104.0)	42.3 (108.1)	43.0 (109.4)	42.9 (109.2)	41.6 (106.9)	35.8 (96.4)	34.8 (94.6)	36.5 (97.7)	39.2 (102.6)	35.1 (95.2)	34.4 (93.9)	43.0 (109.4)
Mean daily maximum °C (°F)	31.8 (89.2)	34.1 (93.4)	36.8 (98.2)	38.5 (101.3)	37.3 (99.1)	31.5 (88.7)	28.9 (84.0)	28.4 (83.1)	30.5 (86.9)	32.1 (89.8)	31.7 (89.1)	31.0 (87.8)	32.7 (90.9)
Mean daily minimum °C (°F)	14.4 (57.9)	15.7 (60.3)	18.8 (65.8)	21.5 (70.7)	22.4 (72.3)	22.2 (72.0)	21.6 (70.9)	21.2 (70.2)	20.9 (69.6)	20.3 (68.5)	17.4 (63.3)	14.7 (58.5)	19.2 (66.6)
Record low °C (°F)	7.0 (44.6)	8.6 (47.5)	11.1 (52.0)	14.2 (57.6)	15.5 (59.9)	18.5 (65.3)	9.7 (49.5)	17.4 (63.3)	14.1 (57.4)	13.3 (55.9)	8.7 (47.7)	6.5 (43.7)	6.5 (43.7)
Average rainfall mm (inches)	0.3 (0.01)	0.2 (0.01)	6.5 (0.26)	21.6 (0.85)	51.9 (2.04)	137.9 (5.43)	108.1 (4.26)	89.2 (3.51)	124.0 (4.88)	115.6 (4.55)	22.2 (0.87)	4.5 (0.18)	681.8 (26.84)
Average rainy days	0.0	0.0	0.5	1.5	2.8	7.6	9.7	9.2	7.0	5.5	1.5	0.4	45.6
Average relative humidity (%) (at 17:30 IST)	39	31	30	31	45	68	75	76	69	56	49	45	51
Source 1: India Meteorological Department
Source 2: Government of Maharashtra

== Demographics ==
Marathi is the official language, while Kannada is also a widely spoken language of the city. A form of Hindustani, Hyderabadi Deccani is also spoken.

=== Musicians ===
- Vishnu Digambar Paluskar
- Vishnu Narayan Bhatkhande
- Hirabai Badodekar
- Vinayakrao Patwardhan
- Bal Gandharva made his debut performance at the city's Hans Prabha Theatre. In the same location, the Balgandharva Natyagruha was named for him.
- Abdul Karim Khan, a performer of Kirana gharana, lies interred within the Hadrat Khwaja Shamna Mira RH and Hadrat Mira Saheb RH Dargah. An annual music festival at the dargah takes place in his memory.
- Ram Kadam, a Marathi film composer and musician

== String instruments ==
Miraj supplies Indian string instruments such as the sitar, sarod, and tanpura. These are made of wood and specially treated gourds. The art of instrument making was developed by Faridsaheb Shikalgar in the 18th century, and his descendants, who came to use 'Sitarmaker' as their surname,

== Transportation ==
=== Railway ===
Miraj Junction railway station is an important junction on the Central Railway. It was the only junction to have all three rail gauges: broad gauge, narrow gauge, and metre gauge. The last narrow gauge train departed on 1 November 2008.

== MLA ==
Suresh Khade, the MLA from Miraj constituency, represents the Bharatiya Janata Party (BJP) in the 2024 elections.

== See also ==
- William James Wanless – Founder of Wanless Hospital
- Dargah of Meerasaheb Avalia
