= Jamkhandi State =

Princely state of British India (1811–1948)

Coordinates: 16°31′N 75°18′E

Jamkhandi State ಜಮಖಂಡಿ ಸಂಸ್ಥಾನ
- State Within the Maratha Confederacy (1811 - 1818) Princely State of British India
- 1811–1948
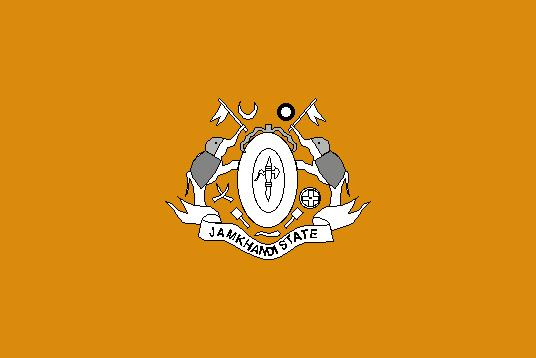
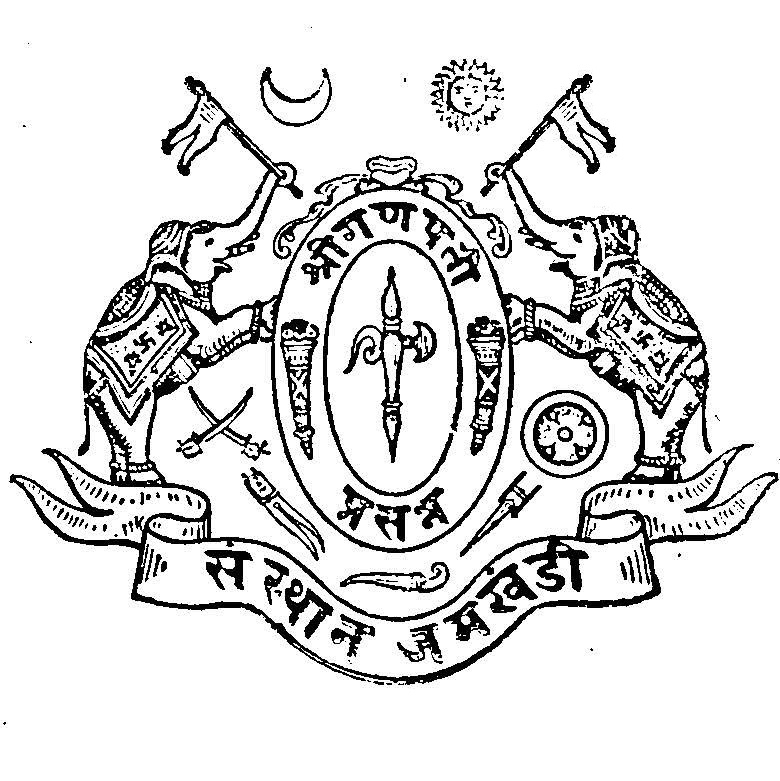
- Flag Coat of arms

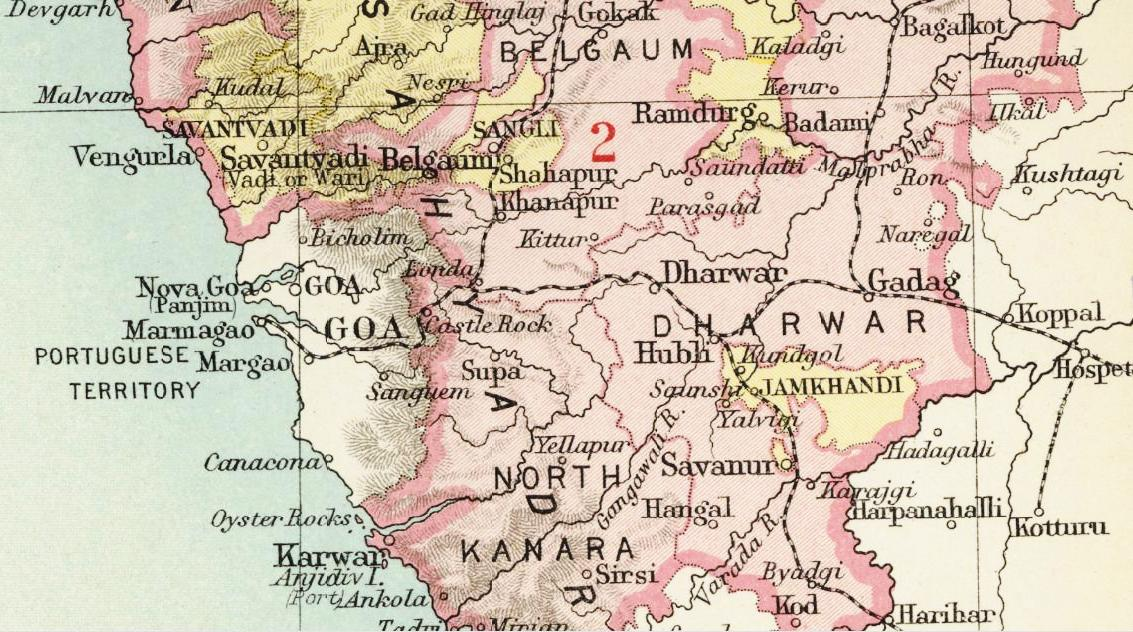
- Jamkhandi State in the Imperial Gazetteer of India
- Area
  - 1901: 1,357 km^{2} (524 sq mi)
- Population
  - 1901: 105,357
- History
  - Established: 1811
  - Acceded to the Union of India: 1948
Preceded by	Succeeded by
Maratha Empire	India
- Today part of: Karnataka, India

Jamkhandi State was one of the Maratha princely states of British India. It was founded in 1811 and its capital was at Jamakhandi. It was administered as part of the Deccan States Agency of the Bombay Presidency and was one of the former states of the Southern Maratha Country. The area that was under this princely state is part of present day Karnataka.

== History ==
Jamkhandi state was founded in 1811 by Shrimant Gopalrao Patwardhan. He was a descendant of Bramhibhoot Harbhat Buva Patwardhan of Kurandvad Senior State.

The name of the state was derived from Jambukeshwar temple. The temple itself got the name because it was deep inside a Jambul blueberry (Jambul in Marathi, Nerale Hannu in Kannada, Jamun in Hindi) forest. Today, a primary school functions from the temple precinct.

The town of Kundgol, which is in the neighboring Dharwar district, was a non-contiguous part of Jamkhandi State until it merged into the Indian Union on 19 February 1948.

=== Rulers ===
The rulers of the state bore the title 'Raja'. The Rajas of Jamkhandi belonged to the Patwardhan dynasty.

The rulers of Jamkhandi were of the Chitpavan Brahmin caste, originally from the Kotawada in Ratnagiri. Haribhat, who was the family priest of another Chitpavan Brahmin, the chief of Ichalkaranji. Three of Haribhat's sons served Peshwa and distinguished themselves during various conquests. The Peshwa awarded them Jagirs of Jamkhandi, Miraj, Sangli and Kurundvad, to honor their bravery and courage.

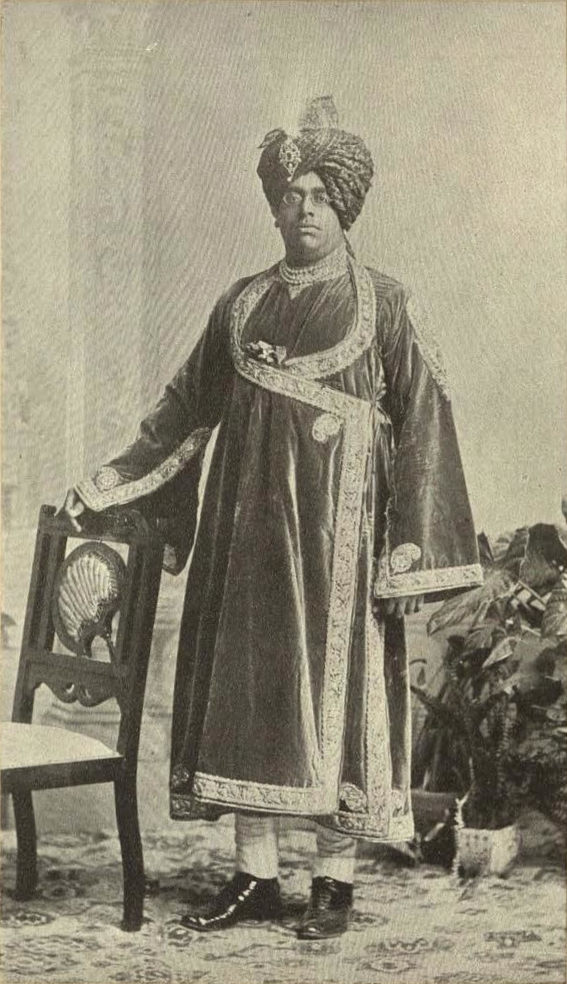
Parshuramrao alias Bhausaheb Patwardhan of Jamkhandi

Jamkhandi was one of the Maratha Princely States of British India and was administered as part of the Bombay Presidency, later by the Deccan States Agency. Jamkhandi was founded by Gopalrao Ramchandrarao Patwardhan (1799–1840) in 1811. He was succeeded by Ramchandrarao Gopalrao Patwardhan (1833–1897), who was a very capable administrator, and moved his capital to Ramtirth, a hill near Jamkhandi, next to an old temple.

==== Rajas ====
Period	Name	Relevance
1811 - 1840	Gopalrao Ramchandrarao Patwardhi	Established the princely state
1840 - 1897	Ramchandrarao Gopalrao Patwardhan (Appa Sahib Patwardhan)	Moved capital to Ramtirth and built the palace.
1897 - 1924	Parshuramrao a.k.a. Bhausaheb Patwardhan	Adopted rajah, took part in Indian Army during World War I. British Empire honored him with Order of the Indian Empire
1924 - 1947	Shankar Rao Parashuram Rao a.k.a. Appa Sahib Patwardhan (b. 1906)	Killed by an elephant. First raja to show willingness to join India.
1947 - signing of Charter of Merger	Parshuramrao Ramchandrarao Patwardhan II	Last rajah who completed Political integration to India

== Famous people ==
- B. D. Jatti
- Ramachandra Dattatrya Ranade

== See also ==
- Maratha
- Maratha Empire
- List of Maratha dynasties and states
- Political integration of India
