= Sumit Bhaduri =

Indian organometallic chemist

- Born: 22 October 1948 (age 77); West Bengal, India
- Education: Presidency College, Kolkata; University of Calcutta; University of Cambridge; University of Milan
- Known for: Studies on metal-carbonyl clusters and to the polymer-supported catalysis
- Awards: 1992 Shanti Swarup Bhatnagar Prize
- Scientific career
- Fields: Inorganic chemistry; Organometallic chemistry
- Workplaces: Alchemie Research Center ACC Research and Consultancy Directorate; Reliance Industries; Northwestern University; University of Bordeaux; Indian Institute of Technology, Mumbai

Sumit Bhaduri (born 1948) is an Indian organometallic chemist and was a senior scientific advisor to Reliance Industries. He is known for his studies on metal-carbonyl clusters and to the polymer-supported catalysis and is credited with the development of technology for the manufacture of Ziegler-Natta polypropylene catalyst which is in use with Reliance Industries.

He has authored a book, Homogeneous Catalysis: Mechanisms and Industrial Applications and is an elected fellow of the Indian National Science Academy and the Indian Academy of Sciences The Council of Scientific and Industrial Research, the apex agency of the Government of India for scientific research, awarded him the Shanti Swarup Bhatnagar Prize for Science and Technology, one of the highest Indian science awards, in 1992, for his contributions to chemical sciences.

== Biography ==
Sumit Bhaduri, born on 22 October 1948, in the Indian state of West Bengal, graduated in chemistry in 1968 from Presidency College, Kolkata when the college was under the University of Calcutta and moved to the UK to do a Tripos at the University of Cambridge in 1971. He stayed at Cambridge to secure a PhD in 1974 and as a Royal Society post-doctoral fellow, he did his post-doctoral studies at the University of Milan in 1975. Subsequently, he went back to Cambridge to complete the studies in 1976. A year later, he returned to India and started his career as a scientist at Alchemie Research Center of the Indian subsidiary of the Imperial Chemical Industries where he continued until 1995 when he resigned from the centre to join ACC Research and Consultancy Directorate. In 1999, he joined Reliance Industries as the head of their R&D Division and resigned as the senior scientific advisor in 2010.

Focusing his researches on homogeneous catalysis, Bhaduri is known to have studied the synthesis of a number of metal-carbonyl clusters and his studies have widened the understanding of polymer-supported catalysis. His researches have been documented in a book, Homogeneous Catalysis: Mechanisms and Industrial Applications, and over 100 research papers published in peer-reviewed national and international journals. He also writes general articles related to science and science education. He holds several patents for the processes he has developed and one of them, on the manufacturing of Ziegler-Natta polypropylene catalyst is in use with his former employers, Reliance Industries.

Bhaduri, a SERC lecturer, has served as a visiting professor at Northwestern University and University of Bordeaux and is adjunct faculty at the Indian Institute of Technology, Mumbai. The Indian Academy of Sciences elected him as their fellow in 1989 and the Council of Scientific and Industrial Research awarded him the Shanti Swarup Bhatnagar Prize, one of the highest Indian science awards, in 1992. He became a fellow of the Indian National Science Academy in 1993.

== See also ==
- Ziegler–Natta catalyst
