= Madhuri Bhaduri =

Indian artist and sportsperson

Madhuri Bhaduri (born 1958) is an Indian artist.

Originally a sportsperson who played badminton and squash at a national level, Bhaduri began painting in 1977. She gave away her early artworks to friends and family, and then began to sell paintings once she realised that people were willing to pay for them. After studying French at the Alliance Française in Pune, Bhaduri graduated with a Master's degree in Art from the University of Mumbai in 1988, but had already begun exhibiting her work two years earlier at the Bal Gandharva Art Gallery.

During her career Bhaduri has created works in a variety of style, including abstract art, landscapes and figurative paintings. Although she primarily works in oils, in 2002 she also experimented with abstract sculpture. Her paintings were purchased by many private collectors, including Gayatri Devi, Ajay Piramal, Aditya Vikram Birla & Jamshed Bhabha (former chairman of Tata Sons). As well as shows in her native India, Bhaduri's work has also been the subject of a solo exhibition in Dubai. Bhaduri is represented by Agora Gallery, New York.

In 2016 Bhaduri received the All Ladies League award for "Iconic leadership in Art, Design & Entrepreneurship", as well as the Sarojini Naidu National Award for Women.

Bhaduri's studio, Studio M, is located in Pune, where she has lived all her life.
