= Warana, Maharashtra =

Village in Maharashtra, India

Coordinates: 19.514°N 76.691°E

Warana is an area in Kolhapur district, Maharashtra, India. It is situated in the Warana River valley.

It is about 400 kilometres (250 mi) southeast of Mumbai (formerly Bombay). Sugarcane is grown in the area.

The community received satellite television in 1997. The internet was installed in Pokhale village, in Warana, circa 1998. The Union government of India established "Wired Village," a $600,000 grant project for information technology in Pokhale and 69 other villages in Warana, simplifying area commerce.
