= Nrisingha Prasad Bhaduri =

Indian historian and writer (born 1950)

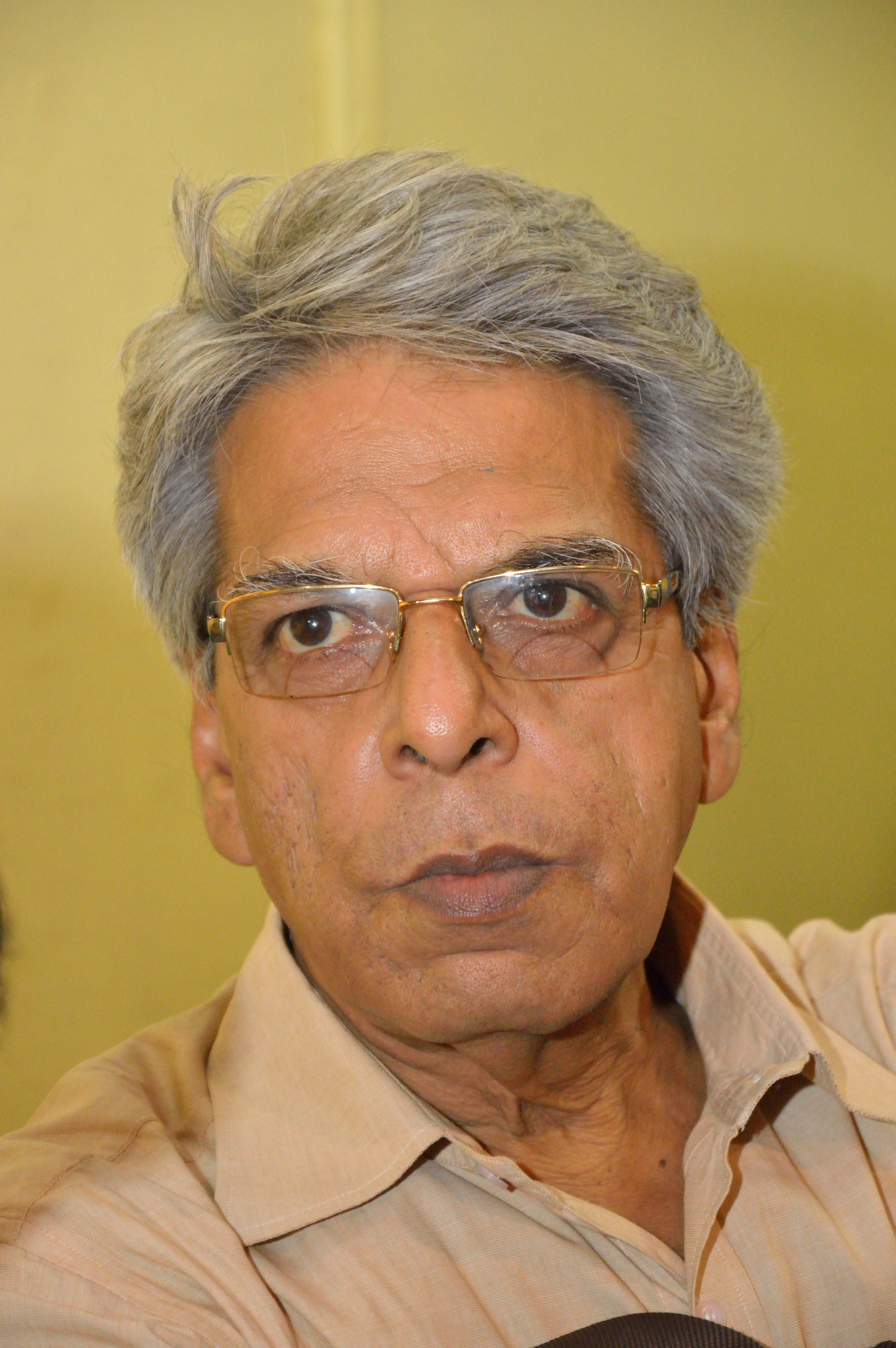
- Bhaduri in 2015
- Born: 23 November 1950 (age 75); Gopalpur, Pabna, East Bengal
- Education: University of Calcutta
- Occupations: Professor (retired), writer
- Known for: Scholar of Indian epics and Puranas
- Awards: Banga Bibhushan (2014)

Nrisingha Prasad Bhaduri (born 23 November 1950) is an Indian writer and Indologist. He is a specialist in Indian epics, Vedas, and Puranas. In 2012, Bhaduri undertook the large-scale project of creating an encyclopedia of the major Indian epics of the Mahabharata and Ramayana. The project is freely available online. Due to the difficulty and complexity of the task, it took Bhaduri a decade to conceptualize the project. During the compendium's creation, several Indian journalists stated that the encyclopaedia was poised to challenge many long-held beliefs about the epics.

== Personal life ==
Nrisingha Prasad Bhaduri was born on 23 November 1950 in the village of Gopalpur in Pabna (now in Bangladesh). He earned a Master of Arts degree in the Sanskrit language from the University of Calcutta. He was a reader of Sanskrit at Gurudas College, Kolkata. He retired from his job on 30 November 2010.

== Literary career ==
Bhaduri is noted for his scholarly but simple interpretations of ancient Indian tales, particularly those appearing in the Indian epics, the Ramayana and the Mahabharata. He generally writes in Bengali and has written books like Balmikir Ram O Ramayan, Arjun o Draupadi, Krishna, Kunti Ebong Kaunteyo, and others. For many years, he has been writing essays on Hindu epic characters in Bengali magazines, including Sarodiya issues in Bartaman, Ananda Publishers, Anandamela, Desh, etc. In his book Dandaniti, Bhaduri deals with politics in ancient and medieval India. Bhaduri writes a regular column, Katha Amrita Saman, which is published in Sangbad Pratidin's Sunday supplement issue Robbar.

The deity Krishna has been a special interest to Bhaduri. He has written multiple books and essays on the character. In the book Mahabharater Bharat Yuddha Ebong Krishna, he discusses the role of Krishna in the Kurukshetra War.

=== Encyclopedia project ===
In March 2012, Bhaduri began directing a major encyclopedia project intended to compile the Indian epics Ramayana, Mahabharata, as well as the Puranas, which is being sponsored by Bengali book publisher Sahitya Samsad and the Netaji Subhas Institute of Asian Studies. Jhimli Mukherjee Pandey of The Times of India has said "The encyclopaedia will challenge claims of certain Indian scholars, who under Western influences have often tried to "sanitise" the character of Krishna. In Bankim Chandra Chattopadhyay's Krishnacharitra, for instance, Krishna is supposed to not have even a single consort." Jaideep Mazumdar of The Times of India said "the encyclopaedia will shatter the colonial hangover that a lot of the research into our ancient scriptures in recent times have suffered from and will present many historical figures in a new light."

Nrisingha Prasad Bhaduri was quoted in an interview as saying:

"I thought it would be a good idea since all the smaller encyclopedias I came across on the Puranas were incomplete and didn't have proper reference labels. I started poring through the Puranas and making card entries. After some time, I thought I should include the Mahabharata also since the stories in the Mahabharata have a parampara (continuity and tradition) with the Puranas. For instance, names of some kings, conventions and rituals for marriages, childbirth and funerals that are found in the Vedas find mention in the Mahabharata as well. And gaps in the Mahabharata's stories, I discovered, can be filled from the Puranas and the Vedas. And since the story of Ramayana is found in a gist in the Mahabharata, I finally decided that a complete encyclopaedia of the epics and the Puranas is necessary since all these texts and scriptures complement each other."

Though the project was planned long ago, it started only in 2010. According to a report published in The Times of India in August 2012, Debojyoti Dutta, chief of the publication, requested Bhaduri to lead the project. Firstly, they planned to make the encyclopedia on the Mahabharata only, but found it was too difficult to cover only one of the epics. For example, the Hindu epic character Krishna is found in a section of the Ramayana as well.

Due to the complexity and difficulty of the project, it took Bhaduri a whole decade to work on the concept alone. Bhaduri received assistance from research scholars at the Netaji Subhas Institute of Asian Studies. The team felt they could finish the project by 2013, but Bhaduri later said – "after going full steam we realised that it is going to be more difficult than we thought. I think we will go well into 2015".

== Books ==
| Title | Year | Language | Publishers | ISBN |
|---|---|---|---|---|
| Balmikir Ram O Ramayan | 1989 | Bengali | Ananda Publishers | ISBN 978-81-7066-226-6 |
| Mahabharater Bharat Juddho O Krishna | 1990 | Bengali | Ananda Publishers | ISBN 978-81-7215-028-0 |
| Mahabharat (Chotoder Jonyo) | 1993 | Bengali | Sishu Sahitya Sansad | |
| Arjun O Draupadi | 1993 | Bengali | Sahitya Sansad | |
| Syama Mayer Charit Katha, Syama Mayer Gaan | 1993 | Bengali | Antaranga Publishers | |
| Debatara manabayana, sastre, sahitye ebam kautuke | 1995 | Bengali | Ananda Publishers | ISBN 978-81-7215-156-0 |
| Krishna, Kunti Ebong Kaunteyo | 1998 | Bengali | Ananda Publishers | ISBN 978-81-72153-85-4 |
| Dandaniti | 1998 | Bengali | Sahitya Sansad | |
| Sukasaptati: Alocana, Samskrta-mula ebam banganubada : dvadasa-trayodasa satakera Samskrta galpa samkalana | 2001 | Bengali | Ananda Publishers | ISBN 978-81-7756-100-5 |
| Mahabharater Chhoy Prabin | 2002 | Bengali | Ananda Publishers | ISBN 978-81-7756-228-6 |
| Mahabharater Pratinayak | 2009 | Bengali | Ananda Publishers | ISBN 978-8-17756-820-2 |
| Mahabharater Loghu Guru | 2012 | Bengali | Patralekha | |
| Bhitor Bahir | 2012 | Bengali | Deep Prakasan | |
| Kaliyug | 2007 and 2013 | Bengali | Gangchil and Deep Publishers | |
| Chaitanyadeb | 2011 and 2013 | Bengali | Deep Publishers and Patralekha | |
| Ramani | 2013 | Bengali | Karigar | |
| Mahabharater Ostadasi | 2013 | Bengali | Ananda Publishers | |
| Achar Bichar Sanskar | 2013 | Bengali | Abhijan Publishers | |
| Mystery Plays in Sanskrit | 2013 | English | Progressive Publishers | |
| Katha Amritosoman | 2014 | Bengali | Deys Publishers | ISBN 978-81-295-1915-3 |
| Mahabharat: Neeti, Aneeti, Durniti | 2014 | Bengali | Patralekha | |
| Nana Charcha | 2014 | Bengali | Abhijan Publishers | |
| Asadukti Halahal | 2014 | Bengali | The See Book Agency | |
| Bromha Janen | 2017 | Bengali | Abhijan Publishers | |

=== Translated books ===
| Title | Year | Language | Publishers | Translator |
|---|---|---|---|---|
| Krishna, Kunti O Kaunteya | 2001 | Oriya | Vidyapati Publishers, Cuttack | Sashibhusan Mishra |
| Krishnadvaipayan Vyas | 2006 | Hindi | Remadhav Publications, Gaziabad | Amar Goswami |
| Gandhari | 2007 | Assamese | Saraighat Publishers, Guwahati | Laxmi Bor Thakur |
| Dronacharya | 2008 | Hindi | Remadhav Publications, Gaziabad | Utpal Banerjee |
| Vyas Dvaipayan | 2010 | English | Oxford University Press | Kalpana Bardhan |
| Dhritarashtra | 2010 | Hindi | Remadhav Publications, Gaziabad | Ram Sankar Dwibedi |
| Kripacharya | 2010 | Hindi | Remadhav Publications, Gaziabad | Ram Sankar Dwibedi |
