= Chintamanrao Dhundirao Patwardhan =

3rd Raja of the princely state of Sangli of British Raj

Raja Sir Chintamanrao Dhundirao Patwardhan
- KCSI, KCIE, PB
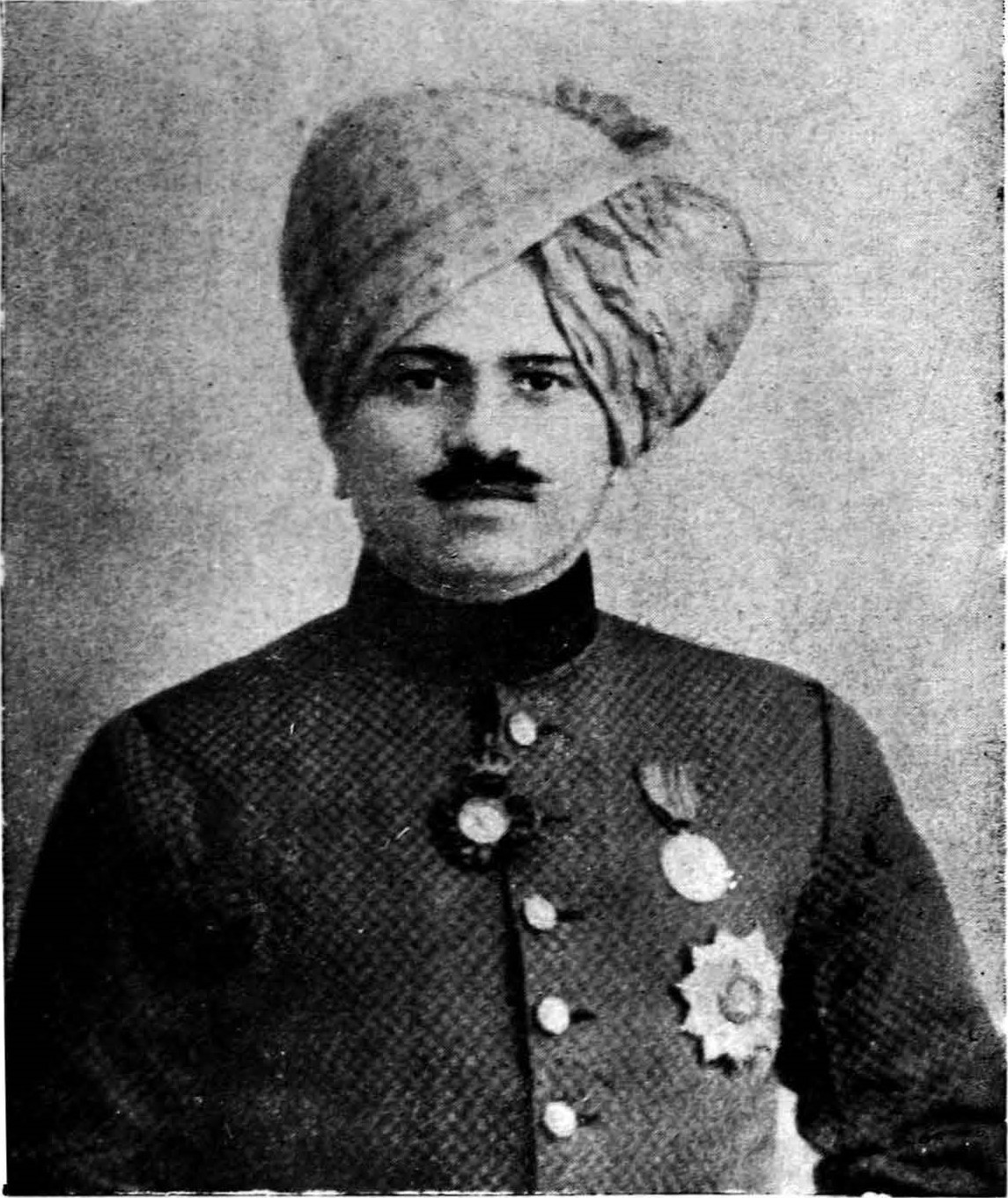

3rd Raja of Sangli State
- Reign: 1903 – 1948
- Predecessor: Dhundirajrao Chintamanrao Patwardhan
- Successor: Vijaysinghrao Madhavrao Patwardhan
- Born: 14 February 1890
- Died: 11 February 1965 (aged 74)
- Religion: Hinduism

Raja, Sir Chintamanrao Dhundirao Patwardhan KCSI, KCIE, PB (14 February 1890 - 11 February 1965) also known as Appasaheb Patwardhan was the 3rd Raja of the princely state of Sangli of British Raj during the reign (15 June 1903 – 19 February 1948 ) (but officially with full power's on 5 June 1910). He signed the accession to the Indian Union on 19 February 1948 which ended the separate existence of Sangli State.

== Early life ==
Chintamanrao Dhundirao was born on 14 February 1890 in a Brahmin family of Sangli State. Shrimant Dhundiraj Chintamanrao alias Tatyasaheb- Patwardhan the 2nd ruler of Sangli State died without male issue on 12 December 1901, and Vinayakrao Bhausaheb, who was the adopted grandson of Shrimant Chintamanrao Appasaheb I (1st ruler of Sangli), was selected by Government as successor. He is named as Chintamanrao Dhundirao and was succeeded as Raja of Sangli on 15 June 1903. During this time he was still studying at Rajkumar College, Rajkot. After his college education and becoming major, he was invested with full ruling powers on 2 June 1910, by Captain Birk (who was appointed by the Sangli Durbaar as the administrator during the ruler's adolescence). On 26 June 1910 he married Saraswatibai, daughter of Moropant Vishvanath Joshi of Amaravati. Saraswatibai was awarded on 3 June 1929 the Kaiser-i-Hind Gold Medal of the First Class in recognition of her public services in the cause of the womanhood of State. Chintamanrao has always taken a keen interest in the administration of his State, and has introduced several reforms.

== Honours ==
- On 14 October 1919, he was conferred with the honorary rank of lieutenant in recognition of his services rendered during World War I.
- On 1 January 1923, he was awarded Knight Commander of the Order of the Indian Empire (KCIE).
- In 1927, he was granted a personal salute of 11 guns.
- In 1938, he was raised to the Honorary rank of captain in the Army.
- In 1946, he was conferred a Knight Commander of the Order of the Star of India (KCSI).
- In 1965, he was awarded a Padma Bhushan by the Government of India.

== Bibliography ==
- Central, Government (1931). List Of Ruling Princes And Chiefs In Political Relations With The Government Of Bombay And Their Leading Officials Nobles And Personages. Calcutta: Government of India Central Publication Branch.
