= Amit Bhaduri =

Professor at JNU

Amit Bhaduri is a former emeritus professor at Jawaharlal Nehru University (JNU).

== Early life and education ==
Bhaduri completed his education at Presidency College, Calcutta, the Massachusetts Institute of Technology, and Cambridge University, earning a Ph.D. in 1967.

== Career ==
Bhaduri has worked as a scholar at Presidency College and the Institute of Management in Calcutta; the Delhi School of Economics and Jawaharlal Nehru University in New Delhi; the Centre for Development Studies in Trivandrum; El Colegio de México; Stanford University; the University of Vienna and University of Linz in Austria; the Norwegian University of Science and Technology; Bremen University in Germany; and the University of Bologna and University of Pavia in Italy.

In the Spring of 1997, Bhaduri was a Fellow at the Swedish Collegium for Advanced Study in Uppsala, Sweden.

Presently, Bhaduri holds the position of selected professor at Pavia University, Italy, while also serving as a visiting professor at the Council for Social Development in Delhi University. He spends part of the year teaching in Italy, with his primary residence in New Delhi.

== Research ==
Bhaduri's has researched multiple subjects, including capital and growth theory, development economics, and Keynesian and Post-Keynesian macroeconomics.

== Awards and recognition ==
- 2016: Leontief Award

== Bibliography ==
- The Economic Structure of Backward Agriculture (1982)
- Macroeconomics: The Dynamics of Commodity Production (1986)
- Unconventional Economic Essays (1992)
- An Intelligent Person's Guide to Liberalisation (1996)
- On the Border of Economic Theory and History (1999)
- Development with Dignity (2006)
