= Amba Ghat =

Mountain pass in India

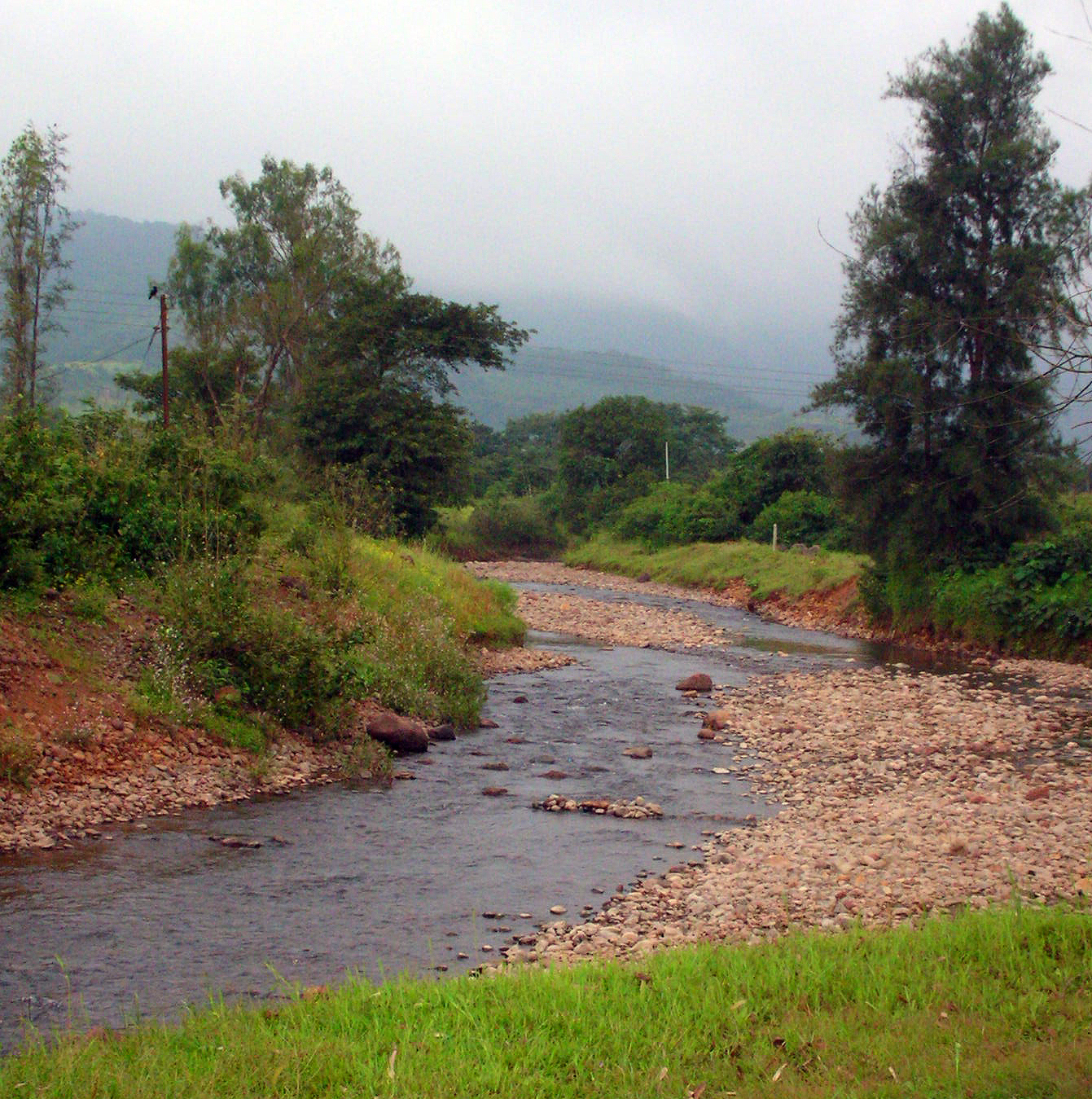
- A stream near Amba hamlet close to the pass.

- Location within Maharashtra

Third Approach
- Location: Maharashtra, India
- Range: Sahyadri
- Coordinates: 17.0006888°N 73.7772247°E

Amba Ghat [ˈɒːmbə gæt] is a mountain pass on Ratnagiri-Kolhapur road (NH 204) in Maharashtra, India, at a height of 2000 ft above sea-level, This ghat lies in the Sahyadri mountain ranges (Western Ghats) and has picturesque mountain-scapes and a pleasant climate. It is situated near Shahuwadi, Kolhapur district, and has nearby interesting places are Pawankhind and Vishalgad fort. It is a convenient weekend destination for Kolhapur tourists.

The area has also become a venue for paragliding sport.
