= Sangli State =

Princely state of India (1782–1948)

Coordinates: 16.867°N 74.567°E

- State Within the Maratha Confederacy (1782 - 1818); Princely State (1819 - 1948) of British India
- 1782–1948
- Flag

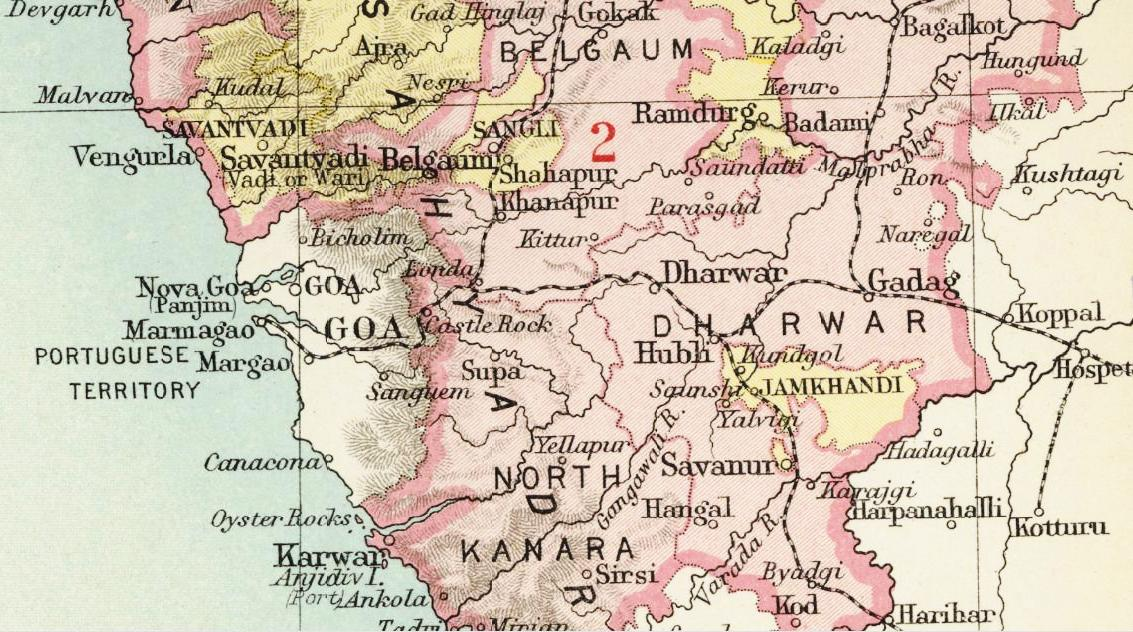
- Sangli State in the Imperial Gazetteer of India
- Area
  - 1901: 2,880 km^{2} (1,110 sq mi)
- Population
  - 1901: 137,268
- History
  - Established: 1782
  - Independence of India: 1948
Preceded by	Succeeded by
Maratha Empire	Dominion of India
- Today part of: Maharashtra, India

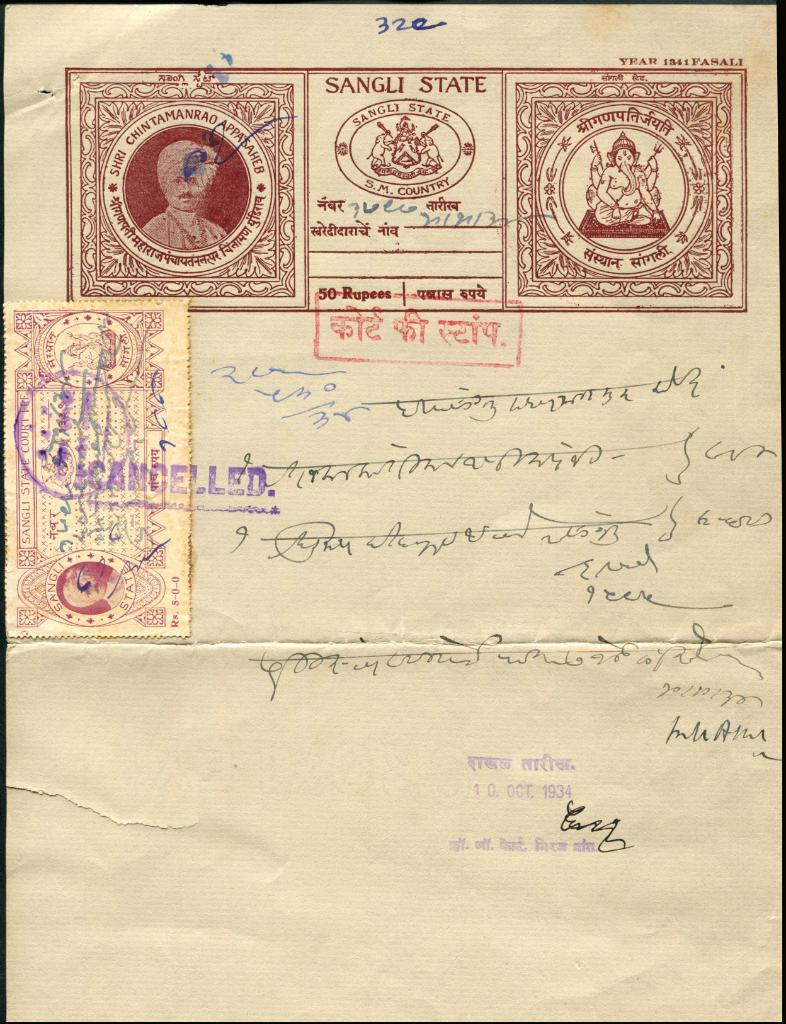
A 1934 stamped paper from Sangli State.

Sangli State was one of the 11-gun salute Maratha princely states of British India. It was under the Kolhapur-Deccan Residency in the Bombay Presidency, and later the Deccan States Agency.

The Principality of Sangli covered an area of 2,880 square kilometers and had a population of 226,128 in 1901, while the population of the town itself was 16,829 in that year.

The capital of the state was Sangli. The city derives its name from "Saha Galli" ("Six Lanes" in Marathi).

== History ==
Sangli was part of the Maratha Empire, for it had been one of the Southern Maratha Jagirs. However, there are no direct references mentioning Sangli before 1801. During the time of Chhatrapati Shivaji, Sangli, Miraj and surrounding areas were captured from the Mughal Empire. Until 1801, Sangli was included in the Miraj Jagir. The first Raja Chintamanrao Appasaheb Patwardhan established a different principality with Sangli as the capital city.

On 5 May 1819, Sangli State became a British protectorate. Its territory was widely scattered among other native states and British districts.

The last ruler of Sangli was Capt. HH Shrimant Raja Saheb Sir Chintamanrao II Dhundirajrao Appasaheb Patwardhan. Sangli joined the Dominion of India on 19 February 1948, and is currently a part of the state of Maharashtra.

== Rulers ==
The rulers of Sangli State were Hindu and belonged to the Patwardhan dynasty. They used the title of 'Rao'. The last ruler adopted the title 'Raja'

The Patwardhan rulers were of the Chitpavan Brahmin caste, originally from the Kotawada in Ratnagiri. Haribhat, who was the family priest of another Chitpavan Brahmin, the chief of Ichalkaranji. Three of Haribhat's sons served Peshwa and distinguished themselves during various conquests. The Peshwa awarded them Jagirs of Jamkhandi State, Miraj, Sangli and Kurundwad, to honour their bravery and courage.

=== Raos ===
- 1782 – 15 Jul 1851 Chintaman Rao I "Appa Sahib" (b. 1776 - d. 1851)
- 1782 - 1801 Gangadharrao - Regent
- 15 Jul 1851 – 12 Dec 1901 Dhundi Rao Chintaman Rao "Tatya Sahib" (b. 1838 - d. 1901)
  - 15 Jul 1851 – 12 Jul 1860 .... -Regent
- 12 Dec 1901 – 1 Jun 1932 Chintamanrao Dhundirao Patwardhan "Appa Sahib" (b. 1890 - d. 1965) (from 1 Jan *1923, Sir Chintamanrao Dhundirao Patwardhan)
- 12 Dec 1901 – 2 Jun 1910 Richard John Charles Burke - Regent (b. 1878 - d. 1960)

=== Raja ===
- 1 Jun 1932 – 8 March 1965 Sir Chintaman Rao Dhundi Rao "Appa Sahib" (s.a.)
- 9 March 1965 - present Raja Vijaysinh Patwardhan

== See also ==
- List of Maratha dynasties and states
- List of Brahmin dynasties and states
- List of Indian princely states
