= Kurundvad Senior =

Maratha princely state (1854–1948)

Coordinates: 16°41′N 74°38′E

Kurundwad State (1733–1854) Kurundvad Senior State (1854–1948)
- State Within the Maratha Confederacy (1733 - 1818); Princely State of British India
- 1733–1948
- Flag

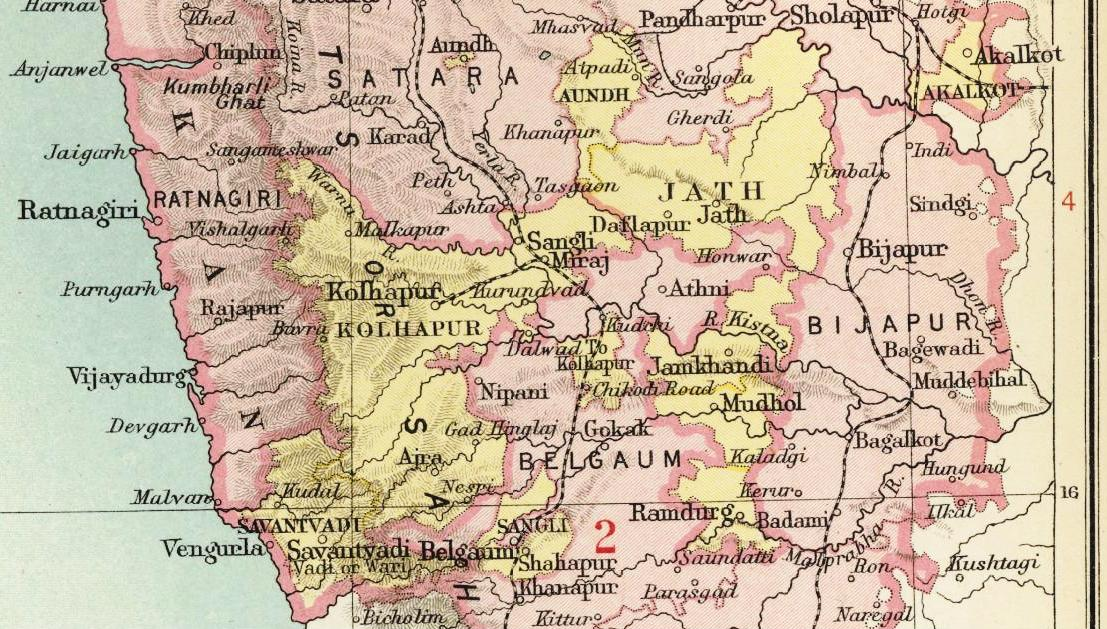
- Kurundvad in the Imperial Gazetteer of India
- Area
  - 1901: 479 km^{2} (185 sq mi)
- Population
  - 1901: 42,474
- History
  - Established: 1733
  - Independence of India: 1948
Preceded by	Succeeded by
Maratha Empire	India
- Today part of: Maharashtra, India

Kurundvad Senior, also spelt as 'Kurundwad', was one of two Maratha princely states during the British Raj: 'Kurundvad Junior' and Kurundvad Senior. The two states separated in 1854 and less than a century later, on 8 March 1948, both states acceded to the Indian Union.

Kurundvad Senior State was administered as part of the Deccan States Agency of the Bombay Presidency. Its capital was at Kurundvad a small town by the Panchganga river in Kolhapur district. The surface of was 479 km^{2}, larger than Kurundvad Junior; its population in 1881 was 35,187 and by 1901 it reached 42,474 inhabitants, of which 34,000 were Hindu, 4,500 Muslim and 3,500 Jain.

== History ==
The predecessor of the two states, Kurundvad State, was founded in 1733 following a grant by the Maratha Peshwa to Trimbakrao Patwardhan. A first division occurred in 1811. In 1819, Kurundvad State became a British protectorate.

On 5 April 1854, Kurundvad State split into a Senior Branch and a Junior Branch. Although they held different territories, the capital, Kurundvad, was shared between the two states. The territory of both was widely scattered, forming enclaves within other native states and British districts. Kurundvad Senior retained 37 villages. The greater part of the state was formed by 25 villages located south of Belgaum. Another 10 villages were located in the valley of the Kistna river, mostly dispersed with swathes of British territory in between, but a few of these villages were also located within the Sangli, Kolhapur and Miraj States. The remaining two villages were particularly isolated from the rest of the princely state. These were the villages of Tikota (an enclave in Bijapur District, now in Karnataka) and Wategaon village (an enclave in Satara District, now in Maharashtra) both separated from the rest of the territory.

== Rulers ==
The rulers of the state belonged to the Patwardhan dynasty and bore the title 'Rao'.

- 1733 – 1771 Trimbakrao I "Appa Sahib" Patwardhan (d. 1771)
- 1771 – 3 March 1771 Nilkanthrao "Dada Sahib" Patwardhan (b. 1726 – d. 1771), son of Trimbakrao I
- 1771 – 1801 Raghunathrao I "Dada Sahib" Patwardhan (b. 1750 – d. 1801), son of Nilkanthrao
- 1801 – 18.. Trimbakrao II "Appa Sahib" Patwardhan, (years of rule unknown), son of Raghunathrao I
- 18.. – 1827 Keshavrao "Baba Sahib" Patwardhan (b. ... – d. 1827), son of Trimbakrao II
- 1827 – 1876 Raghunathrao II "Dada Sahib" Patwardhan (b. 1812 – d. 1876), son of Keshavrao
- 25 Jan 1876 – 16 February 1908 Chintamanrao I "Bala Sahib" Patwardhan (b. 1849 – d. 1908), son of Raghunathrao II
- 16 Feb 1908 – 10 September 1927 Bhalchandrarao "Anna Sahib" Patwardhan (b. 1873 – d. 1927), son of Chintamanrao I
- 1927 – 1937 (regency) Sitabai Bhalchandrarao Patwardhan "Mai Sahib" (b. 1901 – d. 1969), wife of Bhalchandrarao and mother of Chintamanrao II
- 1937-1942 Ramchandra Bhalchandrarao Patwardhan (b.1900-1974)
- 1942 – 8 March 1948 Chintamanrao II "Bala Sahib" Patwardhan (b. 1921 – d. 1980), son of Bhalchandrarao

On 8 March 1948, the state acceded to India. Titular rulers of Kurundwad Senior in independent India have been:

- 8 March 1948 – 15 January 1975 Chintamanrao II "Bala Sahib" Patwardhan (b. 1921 – d. 1980), son of Bhalchandrarao
- 1975-1977 Vasantrao Ramchandra Patwardhan (b.1944-1991), Son of Ramchandra

The heir to the throne is Agastyanand Vasantrao Patwardhan (b.1974), only son of Vasantrao

- 15 Jan 1980 – Present Bhalchandrarao II Chintamanrao Patwardhan (b. 1953)

The heir to the throne is Raghunathrao Bhalchandrarao Patwardhan (b. 1988), only son of the incumbent

== See also ==
- Maratha Empire
- List of Maratha dynasties and states
- Political integration of India
