= Shahuwadi =

- Interactive map of Shahuwadi
- Country: India
- State: Maharashtra
- District: Kolhapur

Area
  - Total: 1,023.33 km^{2} (395.11 sq mi)

Population (2011)
  - Total: 180,322
  - Density: 176.211/km^{2} (456.384/sq mi)

Languages
  - Official: Marathi English language
- Time zone: UTC+5:30 (IST)

Shahuwadi is a tehsil in the Karvir subdivision of the Kolhapur district in the Indian state of Maharashtra.

As India expanded in 1949, Kolhapur was redistricted and expanded to include Shahuwadi.

The Amba Ghat mountain pass on Ratnagiri-Kolhapur road (NH 204) is nearby. Shahuwadi has 145 villages. The distance between Kohalpur and Shahuwadi is 46.5km.

== Historical places ==
- Ganpati Mandhir
- Pawankhind
- Old Palace
- Laxmi Vilas Palace
- Shalini Palace
- Dongrai Buddhist Caves
- Teen Darwaja
- Sandhya Math
- Dutondi Buruj
- Panhala Fort
- Naykinicha Sajja
- Ambarkhana

== Language ==
The official languages are English and Marathi.
