= Kodoli =

- Census town
- Location in Maharashtra, India
- Coordinates: 16.88°N 74.2°E
- Country: India
- State: Maharashtra
- District: Kolhapur
  - Rank: 4th in Kolhapur District
- Elevation: 548 m (1,798 ft)

Population (2011)
  - Total: 70,000

Languages
  - Official: Marathi
- Time zone: UTC+5:30 (IST)
- PIN: 416 114
- Vehicle registration: MH09

Kodoli is a census town in Kolhapur district in the Indian state of Maharashtra. It is situated between the foothills of Panhala fort (Ranges) and Warana River. Kodoli is well developed town as per all point of view. Kodoli is home to many and variety of industries. This is one of the unique towns in the Maharashtra where you can get glimpse of modernity and heritage at one place e.g. town still inherits open air theaters. Kodoli is the biggest city in Panhala tehsil.

== Geography ==
Kodoli is located at 16.88°N 74.2°E. It has an average elevation of 548 metres (1797 feet).

== History ==
A. N. Upadhye identified Kodoli with the khaṃpaṇa (roughly equivalent to a taluka) of Koḍavalli, in the deśa (province) of Miriñji (present-day Miraj), mentioned in a copper plate inscription from Kolhapur dated to 26 June 1126.

== Demographics ==
As of 2011 India census, Kodoli has a population above 85,000. Males constitute 53% of the population and females 47%. Kodoli has an average literacy rate of 88%, higher than the national average of 59.5%: Male literacy is 84%, and female literacy is 76%. In Kodoli, 12% of the population is under 6 years of age. Kodoli is biggest village of Maharashtra state and currently(2014) its population is 85,000; in spite of it, Kodoli is still managed by Grampanchayat. This is one of the villages which converted Grampanchayat to Nagarparishad and after few days Nagarparishad to Grampanchayat. Approximately 80% revenue is generated from Warana Co-operative. Kodoli is divided in 8 Parts-1.Old Village 2.Anand Nagar 3.Vaibhav Nagar 4.Sakharwadi 5.Warana Nagar 6.Tatyasaheb Kore nagar 7. Vinay Kore nagar 8.Amrut nagar. Kodoli created its own identity in India as a Big Co-operative Sector. which includes Banks, mall's, Sugar mill, milk processing plant{namely-Warna Dudh samuha} & other peripheral Agricultural businesses, Kodoli also has a big Bajarpeth for all materials.

== Transportation ==
Kodoli is well connected to its nearby villages, town and cities by road. One can rely upon the State Transport or commonly referred as ST. However Vadaap is the alternative means of transport which is quite reliable and efficient too. Kodoli connected to NH4 through State Highway 126. Nearest railway station is CSMT Kolhapur (33 km) where as Kolhapur Airport is the nearest airport (35 km).

== Industries in Kodoli ==
- Warana Sahkari Sakhar Karkhana
- Warna Paper Mill
- Warana Sahkari Dudh Utpadak Sangh
- Morana Milks
- Manugraph India Ltd
- Chocolate Factory
- Built Tube
- SSBINL KODOLI

== Banks in Kodoli ==
- Bank of India, Kodoli
- Bank of India, Amrutnagar
- State Bank of India, Warananagar
- Union Bank of India, Kodoli
- HDFC Bank, Kodoli
- ICICI Bank, Kodoli
- Bank of Maharashtra, Kodoli
- KDCC Bank, Kodoli
- The Kodoli Urban co-operative Bank, Kodoli

== Educational institutions ==
- Tatyasaheb Kore Institute of Engineering and Technology, Warananagar
- Tatyasaheb Kore College of Pharmacy, Warananagar
- TKIET Polytechnic Warnanagar
- Yashwantrao Chavan Warana Mahavidyalay, Warananagar
- Shree Warana Vidyalay, Warananagar
- Yashwant Ayurvdic College, Kodoli
- Yashwant College of Nursing, Kodoli
- Vasantidevi Patil Institute of Pharmacy, Kodoli
- Kodoli Highschool & Bhai S T Patil (Appa) Junior College, Kodoli
- Yashwant Highschool & Junior College, Kodoli
- Yashwant B.Ed. College, Kodoli
- Yashwant Highschool & Junior College, Kodoli
- Howard Memorial Highschool, Kodoli

== Entertainment ==
In kodoli first open air theater "Sajay" was started in 1965 and name of owner was Mr.Vasantrao Bandopant Kodgule. He was also Director of one Marathi Movie-"Patale Tar Vhay Mahna" in 1970. After that following talkies established in Kodoli

- Shivani Talkies erstwhile Ganesh Talkies
