= Kurundvad Junior =

Maratha princely state (1854–1948)

Coordinates: 16°41′N 74°38′E

Kurundwad State (1733–1854) Kurundvad Junior State (1854–1948)
- State Within the Maratha Confederacy (1733 - 1818); Princely State of British India
- 1733–1948
- Flag

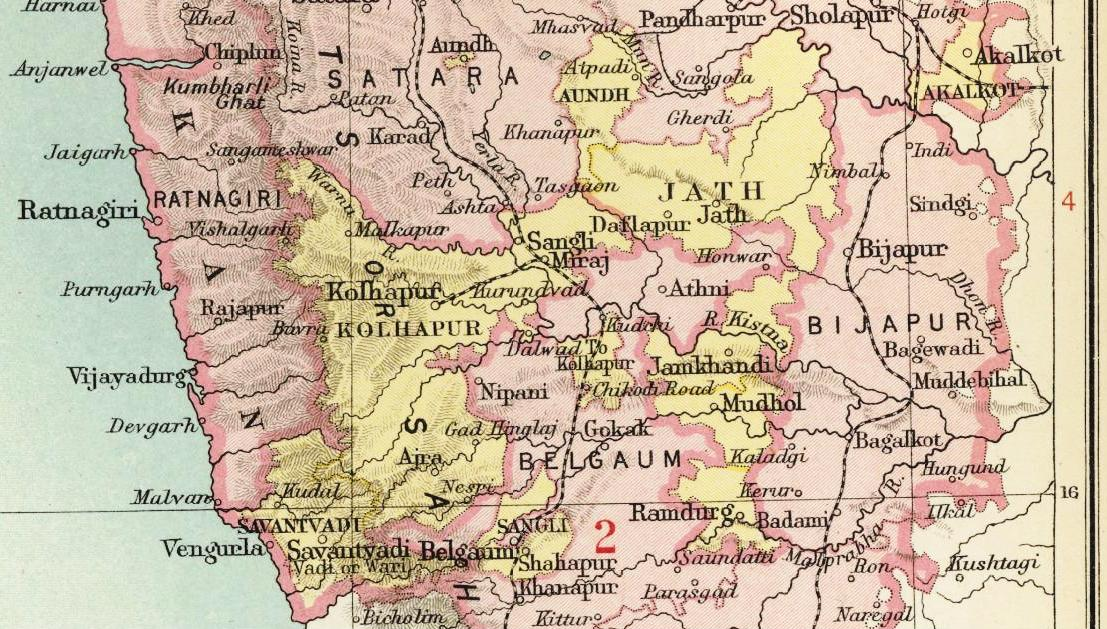
- Kurundvad in the Imperial Gazetteer of India
- Area
  - 1901: 295 km^{2} (114 sq mi)
- Population
  - 1901: 34,003
- History
  - Established: 1733
  - Independence of India: 1948
Preceded by	Succeeded by
Maratha Empire	India
- Today part of: Maharashtra, India

Kurundvad Junior, also spelt as 'Kurundwad', was of two Maratha princely states during the British Raj: 'Kurundvad Senior' and Kurundvad Junior. The two states separated in 1854 and less than a century later, on 8 March 1948, both states acceded to the Indian Union.

With a surface of 295 km^{2}, Kurundvad Junior was smaller than the territory ruled by the senior line. Its population in 1881 was 25,811 and in 1901 it had risen to 34,003.

Like Kurundvad Senior, Kurundvad Junior State was administered as part of the Deccan States Agency of the Bombay Presidency. Its capital was at Kurundvad a small town by the Panchganga river in Kolhapur district. Although they held different territories, the capital, Kurundvad, was shared between the two states. The territory of both was widely scattered, forming enclaves within other native states and British districts.

== History ==
The predecessor of the two states, Kurundvad State, was founded in 1733 following a grant by the Maratha Peshwa to Trimbakrao Patwardhan. A first division occurred in 1811. In 1819 Kurundvad State became a British protectorate.

On 5 April 1854 Kurundvad State split into a Senior Branch and a Junior Branch. While Shrimant Raghunathrao continued the Senior Line, his three younger brothers ruled jointly in Kurundwad Junior. After the youngest brother died without issue the descendants of the two middle brothers continued to rule jointly till 1947, just before acceding to the Indian Union.

Kurundvad Junior State included 34 villages of which 17 were located near Belgaum, mostly on the southern side of the city. Other 15 villages were close to the border of Hyderabad State, of which part of them were in Sholapur District. The remaining two villages were small enclaves within Kolhapur State.

== Rulers ==
The rulers of the state belonged to the Patwardhan lineage and bore the title 'Rao'.

=== Raos ===
- 1733 - 1771 Trimbakrao I "Appa Sahib Patwardhan" (d. 1771)
- 1771 - 3 Mar 1771 Nilkanthrao "Dada Sahib Patwardhan" (b. 1726 - d. 1771)
- 1771 - 1801 Raghunathrao I "Dada Sahib Patwardhan" (b. 1750 - d. 1801)
- 1801 - 18.. Trimbakrao II "Appa Sahib Patwardhan"
- 18.. - 1827 Keshavrao "Baba Sahib Patwardhan"
- 1827-1854 Raghunathrao II "Dada Sahib Patwardhan"

=== After the split ===
(Often ruling jointly)

- 5 Apr 1854 - 1869 Trimbakrao III (d. 1869)
- 5 Apr 1854 - 18.. Vinayakrao I (b. 1823 - d. ....) "Appa Sahib Patwardhan"
- 5 Apr 1854 - 1899 Ganpatrao I Hariharrao (b. 1837 - d. 1899)
- 1876 - 1911 Hariharrao Vinayakrao (b. 1852 - d. 19..) "Daji Sahib Patwardhan"
- 29 Jul 1899 - 1931 Madhavrao Ganpatrao "Bhav Sahib Patwardhan" (b. 1875 - d. 1948)
- 1911 - 1932 Vinayakrao II Hariharrao "Nana Sahib Patwardhan" (b. 1877 - d. 1932)
- 1902 - 1974 Ramchandrapant Appa Patwardhan (b. 1902- d. 1974) "Appa Sahib"
- 1932 - 9 Nov 1942 Ganpatrao II Madhavrao (b. 1900 - d. 1942) "Bapu Sahib Patwardhan"
- 1944 - 1991 Vasantrao Patwardhan (b. 1944 - d. 1991)
- 1942 - 15 Aug 1947 Ganpatrao III Trimbakrao (b. 1924 - d. 2004) "Tatya Sahib Patwardhan"
- 1974 Agastyanand Patwardhan "Naykude" (b. 1974)
- 1988 Yashwant Patwardhan "Naykude" (b. 1988)

== See also ==
- Maratha Empire
- List of Maratha dynasties and states
- Political integration of India
