= Patwardhan =

Patwardhan may refer to the surname used by members of the Marathi Chitpavan Brahmin community, They are often associated with the Shukla Yajurvedi Brahmins and belong to specific gotras like Kaundinya or Kashyapa. The Karhade Patwardhans belong to the Kashyapa and Naidhruva Gotra and their history in the Rajapur region of the Konkan dates back to 1191 A.D. Copper plate grants have been recovered from the region.

== Notable people ==
- Achyut Patwardhan, Indian independence activist and political leader and founder of the Socialist Party of India.
- Aditya J Patwardhan, Indian film director, producer and scriptwriter.
- Anand Patwardhan, Indian documentary filmmaker.
- Anant Sadashiv Patwardhan, Indian politician.
- Appa Patwardhan, Popularly known as Konkan Gandhi. Social reformer. Worked on sanitation, khadi and education issues.
- Avinash Balkrishna Patwardhan, Indian civil engineer and lawyer.
- Bhagyashree Patwardhan, Indian film actress.
- Bhushan Patwardhan, former Vice Chancellor of Symbiosis International University.
- Govindrao Patwardhan, harmonium and organ player.
- Madhav Tryambak Patwardhan, Marathi poet and scholar who wrote under the pen name Madhav Julian.
- Nikhil Patwardhan, Indian former first-class cricketer.
- Nirmala Patwardhan, Indian ceramic artist.
- Padma Gole, Marathi poet.
- Patwardhan dynasty
- Ravi Patwardhan, Indian actor
- Shivajirao Patwardhan (1892–1986), Indian physician and social reformer
- Sudhir Patwardhan, Indian contemporary painter.
- Vinayakrao Patwardhan, Indian vocalist.
- Waman Dattatreya Patwardhan, Indian nuclear chemist.

== Sources ==
- Patwardhan, V. G. (1958). चित्पावन कौण्डिन्य गोत्री पटवर्धन कुलवृत्तांत [Genealogy of the Chitpavan Patwardhan Family belonging to the Kaundinya Gotra] (in Marathi). Sangli: V. G. Patwardhan. LCCN 79912249. OCLC 23868645 – via Google Books.

== See also ==
- Padye
