= Miraj Senior =

Maratha princely state

Coordinates: 16°50′N 74°38′E

Miraj State (ca. 1750 - 1820) Miraj Senior State (1820 - 1948)
- State Within the Maratha Confederacy (1750 - 1818); Princely State of British India
- 1820–1948
- Flag

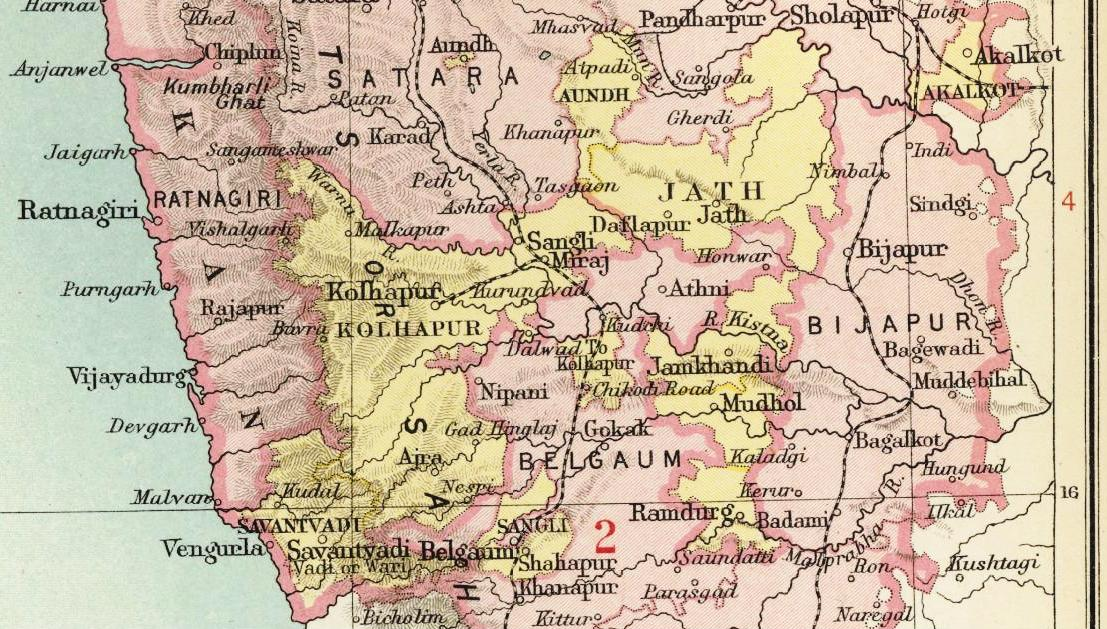
- Miraj in the Imperial Gazetteer of India
- Area
  - 1901: 886 km^{2} (342 sq mi)
- Population
  - 1901: 81,467
- History
  - Established: 1820
  - Independence of India: 1948
Preceded by	Succeeded by
Maratha Empire	India

Miraj Senior was one of two Maratha princely states during the British Raj: 'Miraj Junior' and Miraj Senior. The two states separated in 1820. It was under the southern division of the Bombay Presidency, forming part of the southern Mahratta Jagirs, and later the Deccan States Agency.

Miraj Senior measured 339 square miles (880 km^{2}) in area. According to the 1901 census, the population was 81,467. In 1901, the state enjoyed revenue estimated at £23,000, and paid £800 in tribute to the British Raj. The Raja resided in the town of Miraj (population 18,425 in 1901), which was a junction on the Southern Maratha Railway.

== History ==
The State of Miraj was founded before 1750 and was the former capital of the pre-British State of Sangli. In 1820, the state was divided between a Senior and Junior branch. The territory of both branches was widely scattered among other native states and British districts.

The rulers of the Patwardhan dynasty used the title of Raja, and were of the same clan that ruled nearby Jamkhandi. Raja Govind Rao Patwardhan, 1st Ruler of Miraj, began as a cavalry commander, distinguished himself in several expeditions against the Nizam of Hyderabad and Hyder Ali of Mysore, established the Maratha ascendancy in southern India and pushed the Maratha conquests to the frontier of Mysore.

Miraj Senior acceded to the Dominion of India on 8 March 1948 and is currently a part of Maharashtra state. Miraj is also famous for its musicians, and doctors. In the mid-nineties it had municipal corporation in combination with Sangli and thus lost the edge it had over the neighboring twin city of Sangli for two centuries.

=== Rulers ===
The rulers of Miraj state belonged to the Patwardhan dynasty and bore the title 'Rao'. Sardar Ganpatrao Olekar ( kavthe mahakal) Province

==== Raos ====
- 17.. - 1771 Govindrao Patwardhan (d. 1771)
- 1771 - 1777 Vamanrao Patwardhan (d. 1777)
- 1777 - 1782 Hariharrao Patwardhan (b. c.1765 - d. 1782)
- 1782 - 1801 Chintamanrao Rao I Patwardhan (b. 1776 - d. 1851)
- 1801 - 1820 Gangadharrao I Patwardhan

==== After the split ====
- 1820 - 1833 Ganpatrao I Patwardhan
- 1833 - 1875 Ganpatrao II Patwardhan "Tatyasaheb"
- 6 June 1875 - 1939 Gangadharrao II Patwardhan "Balasaheb" (b. 1866 - d. 1939) (from 1 January 1903, Sir Gangadhar Rao II)
- 11 Dec 1939 – 15 August 1947 Narayanrao II Patwardhan "Tatyasaheb" (b. 1898 - d. 1984)
- Shrimant Madhavrao “Raosaheb” Patwardhan I (b. 1923 - d. 1999)
- Shrimant Gangadharrao III “Balasaheb” Patwardhan (b. 1946 -
- Shrimant Vasant Raje Patwardhan (b. 1944 - d. 1991)
- Rajkumari Yamuna Vasant Naykude (b. 1948 -
- Yuvraj Agastyanand Vasant Raje Patwardhan (b. 1974 -
- Shrimant Keshav Rao/Patwardhan (b. 1985 -
- Shrimant Arjun Rao/Patwardhan (b. 1992 -

== See also ==
- Maratha Empire
- List of Maratha dynasties and states
- Political integration of India
