= Mallikarjuna (Shilahara dynasty) =

Indian ruler from the Shilahara dynasty

Mallikarjuna was an Indian ruler from the Shilahara dynasty. He ruled northern Konkan from 1155–1170 CE.

== Reign ==
Mallikarjuna, who succeeded Haripaladeva, was followed by Aparaditya I, but his relation to his predecessor is not known. Three inscriptions of his reign, dated in Shaka 1106, 1107, and 1108 have been discovered at Lonad, Thane and Parel, respectively. In one of them Aparaditya Is mentioned with the imperial titles Maharajadhiraja and Konkana-Chakravarti, which show that he had thrown off the yoke of the Chaulukyas of Gujarat. He may be referred to the period 1170–1195 CE.

The Prithviraja Vijaya states that the Chahamana king Someshvara beheaded the king of Kunkuna (Konkana) during a campaign of his maternal relative, the Chaulukya king Kumarapala. This king is identified with Mallikarjuna, and his death can be dated to sometime between 1160 and 1162 CE. Kumarapala-Charita gives the credit for killing the Konkana ruler to Amrabhata (alias Ambada), a son of the Chaulukya prime minister Udayana. Historians Dasharatha Sharma and R. B. Singh theorize that Amrabhata was the chief commander of the campaign, while Someshvara was the subordinate general who actually killed Mallikarjuna.
