= Nava-sahasanka-charita =

Sanskrit-language epic poem

Not to be confused with Nava-sahasanka-charita by Shriharsha

Nava-sahasanka-charita (IAST: Nava-sāhasānka-carita, "the biography of the New Sahasanka") is a Sanskrit-language epic poem written by the Paramara court poet Padmagupta, who lived in 10th-11th century. It is fantasy re-telling of the exploits of the Paramara king Sindhuraja, who bore the title Nava-sahasanka, and ruled the Malwa region in central India.

In the epic, Sindhuraja shoots a deer with a golden arrow during a hunting expedition in the Vindhyas. The deer escapes to its owner, the Naga princess Shashiprabha, who sees the hero's title "Nava-Sahasanka" written on the arrow. Meanwhile, in pursuit of the deer, the king comes across a necklace bearing Shashiprabha's name. Sindhuraja and Shashiprabha subsequently meet, and fall in love with each other. Shashiprabha's father has decided to marry her to the man who brings him a golden lotus in the possession of the demon king Vajrankusha. Sindhuraja goes on a campaign against Vajrankusha, guided by the river goddess Narmada and sage Vanku, and supported by the Naga warrior Ratnachuda and the vidyadhara leader Shashikhanda. He defeats the demon king, brings the lotus, and marries Sahshiprabha.

== Authorship ==
The epic was written by Padmgaupta, who was also known as Parimala Kalidasa, and was the son of Mriganka-gupta. He was a Paramara court-poet in the late 10th century and the early 11th century. Padmagupta was a courtier of the epic's subject, the Paramara king Sindhuraja (r. c. 990s), who ruled the Malwa region in central India. In the epic, Padmagupta states that he composed the text at the command of Sindhuraja. Padmagupta's literary career may have spanned the reigns of the Sindhuraja's successors Munja and Bhoja.

The Nava-sahasanka-charita is Padmagupta's only extant work, although he wrote at least one other poem. This can be inferred from the fact that some verses attributed to Padmagupta in the later works are not found in the Nava-sahasanka-charita. These later works include Bhoja's Sarasvati-kantha-bharana, Kshemendra's Auchitya-vichara-charcha, Mammata's Kavya-prakasha, and Vardhamana's Gana-ratna-mahodadhi. The quoted verses suggest that Padmagupta's other poem was about an expedition of King Tailapa's general Basapa against the king Mularaja.

Written in the Vaidarbhi style, Nava-sahasanka-charita does not feature long compounds or heavy alliteration, except in the description of the battle in Canto 12. Padmagupta was an admirer of the ancient poet Kalidasa, and wrote in a highly-embellished language. He often appears to imitate Kalidasa although his expression is original. Some legends associate Bhoja with Kalidasa: this may actually be a reference to Padmagupta alias Parimala Kalidasa.

== Plot ==
Nava-sahasanka-charita is divided into 18 cantos, and centers around Sindhuraja's marriage to princess Shashiprabha. The title of the poem literally means the biography (charita) of the new (nava) Sahasanka. Vikramaditya, a famous legendary king, was also known as Sahasanka ("having the mark of boldness"). His capital Ujjain happened to be located in what had become the Paramara kingdom by Padmgaupta's time.

=== The deer hunt ===
One day, king Sindhuraja (alias Nava-Sahasanka) and his companions go on a hunting expedition in the Vindhya Range. In Canto 2, after shooting various animals with arrows, he tries to hunt a deer. During the chase, he dismounts from his horse, and follows the deer into the forest. He hits the deer with an arrow marked with his own name (Nava-Sahasanka), but the arrow does not cause any serious injury to the deer. The king notices a gold chain around the deer's neck, and suspects that there is something supernatural about it. After the animal disappears into the forest, Sindhuraja's minister Ramangada (alias Yahsobhata) advises the king to avoid the hot sun at the noon, and get some rest. Sindhuraja then bathes in a nearby lake, and takes a short nap. After waking up, he wanders around searching for the deer, but is unable to find the animal. At night, he sleeps on a bed of shoots made by Ramangada.

In Canto 3, the next morning, Sindhuraja goes into the forest searching for the deer, accompanied by Ramangada. The men follow a track marked by blood drops, and see goose flying with a pearl necklace in its beak. Ramangada remarks that the necklace probably belonged to one of the daughters of demons, gods, and Nagas, who amused themselves in the Vindhyas. On Ramangada's advice, Sindhuraja readies to shoot the bird with an arrow, but just then the bird drops the necklace on the shore of a lake, in order to pick up a lotus stalk. Ramangada brings the necklace to the king, who notes the female name "Shashi-prabha" written on it, and wears it.

=== Meeting with Shashiprabha ===
In Canto 4, Sindhuraja feels that he has fallen in love with the unknown woman Shashiprabha. Sometime later, he sees a beautiful woman, who turns out to be Patala, a daughter of the Naga Hema and a companion of Shashi-prabha. In Canto 5, Patala tells him that Shashiprabha is a Nāga princess, who is more beautiful than goddesses and nymphs, and her father Shankha-pala rules from the kingdom's capital Bhogavati. Patala also tells Sindhuraja that the deer shot by him belonged to Shashiprabha, and the princess had fallen in love with him after seeing the name "Nava-Sahasanka" on the arrow. Furthermore, the necklace found by Sindhuraja was taken from the princess by a wild goose. Patala takes the necklace and departs to bring Sindhuraja's golden arrow to him.

In Canto 6, Shashiprabha's companion Malayavati tells her that Nava-Sahasanka is a handsome and skilled king of Avanti, and would make an ideal husband for her. In Canto 7, Shashiprabha and Sindhuraja meet at the banks of the Narmada River, and are evidently in love with each other. Suddenly, a severe thunderstorm emerges, and Shashiprabha clings to Sindhuraja out of fear.

=== Sindhuraja enters the underworld ===
In Canto 8, Sindhuraja's meeting with Shashiprabha ends abruptly, when a voice instructs the princess to return to her home in the underworld (patala). As she departs, Sindhuraja follows her by jumping into the river, looking for an entrance to the underworld, and Ramangada follows him. On the way to the underworld, he overcomes several obstacles: these include a lion and an elephant who vanish when he draws his bow; and a river that turns anyone who touches it into a stone - Sindhuraja jumps over it using a bamboo.

Sindhuraja ultimately reaches a golden palace city, where a caged parrot informs him that the river goddess Naramada will welcome him as a guest. In Canto 9, the goddess informs Sindhuraja that when Shashiprabha was born, the deities told her father - the Naga king - that she would marry the best of men (purushottama), and that she would bring ruin to the Naga enemy Vajrankusha. Consequently, the Naga king had declared that he would marry Shashiprabha to the person who brought him the golden lotus that grew in the pool of the demon (asura) king Vajrankusha. The goddess urges Sindhuraja to do this, telling him that he was a partial incarnation of the god Vishnu, and that the sage Vanku would guide him to Vajrankusha's capital Ratnavati.

In Canto 10, Ramangada urges Sindhuraja to invade Vajrankusha's kingdom, assuring him that the Naga army would support him, just like the Vanara army had supported Rama. As Sindhuraja agrees, the parrot introduces himself as Ratnachuda, a Naga boy who had been transformed into a parrot because of a curse by a pupil of sage Kanva. The sage had told him that the curse will be over when he takes a message from Nava-Sahasanka to Shashiprabha. Accordingly, Sindhuraja told the parrot to inform the queen that he had followed her into the Naga world, and would enter her city after getting the golden lotus.

=== Hermitage of sage Vanku ===
In Canto 11, following Narmada's directions, Sindhuraja comes to the hermitage of sage Vanku. Based on the king's appearance, the sage infers that he was a chakravartin (universal emperor), and welcomes him. When Vanku asks about the king's dynasty, Ramangada narrates the Agnikula legend, according to which the progenitor of the Paramara dynasty originated from a sacrificial fire set up by the sage Vasishtha. Ramangada then names Sindhuraja's predecessors, including Upendra, Vakpati-raja I, Vairisimha, Sindhuraja's father Siyaka, and Sindhuraja's elder brother Vakpati-raja II. The minister then introduces Sindhuraja alias Nava-Sahasanka as the king of Ujjayini, the city of Shiva. He describes the king as a friend of poets, and as someone in whom Sarasvati (the goddess of learning) resided after the legendary kings Vikramaditya and Satavahana had died.

Ramangada then tells Vanku about Sindhuraja's expedition, gifts him a jeweled bracelet, and asks him for guidance. The sage praises the king, predicts success for him in the expedition, and invites him to rest at the hermitage. In Canto 12, Sindhuraja rests at the hermitage, dreaming of Shashiprabha in his sleep. After waking up, as he talks to the sage, a monkey comes to him, and gives him a pomegranate made of jewels. As soon as the king accepts the gift, the monkey turns into a man. The man introduces himself as Shashikhanda, a son of the vidyadhara (wizard) king Sikhandaketu. Shashikhanda explains that a thousand years ago, he tried to abduct a girl from a sage's hermitage, because of which the sage cursed him to become a monkey. The sage had told him that his curse will end when the son of king Siyaka took an ornament from him. Shashikhanda then summons his vidyadhara army to help Sindhuraja.

=== Campaign against Vajrankusha ===
In Canto 13, with the blessings of sage Vanku, Sindhuraja's forces begin the march to Vajrankusha's capital. In Canto 14, with the help of the vidyadhara magical spell, Sindhuraja's chariot flies in air. The vidyadharas vimanas (flying chariots) accompanying him have women who pick up flowers from the trees during the low flight. The army encamps at near the river Ganga to allow the women to take rest. Canto 15 is dedicated to describing the women's bathing in the river, liquor-drinking, and love-making.

On the one hand this large eyed girl,
her body softer than the śirīṣa (flower),
And on the other this fever of love,
rough as a fire of chaff!

— Nava-sahasanka-charita 16.28, Malayavati describes Shashiprabha's state in a letter to Sindhuraja

In Canto 16, Patala arrives with a message from Malayavati, stating that Shashi-prabha loves the king, and wants him to come back soon. Sindhuraja resumes his march, and is joined by Ratnachuda. The brilliant jewel on Ratnachuda's head lights up the army's way in the darkness. As Ratnavati approaches, Sindhuraja attempts to get the golden lotus using peaceful means. He sends Ramangada as an envoy to Vajrankusha, asking the demon king to hand over the golden lotus to enable Sindhuraja to marry Shashiprabha, and offering his friendship in return. Vajrankusha derisively rejects the offer, stating that a beautiful woman like Shashiprabha was not suitable for mere humans. Ramangada then explains that Sindhuraja was not merely a human: he was an incarnation of Vishnu, and will end up taking Vajrankusha's head along with the lotus.

Canto 17 describes Sindhuraja's siege of Ratnavati. Ramangada beheads Vajrankusha's son with a discus (chakra), and Sindhuraja beheads Vajrankusha with an arrow. Sindhuraja is supported by Shashikhanda who fights beside him, and Ratnachuda who lights up the dark underworld with his jewel. After emerging victorious, Sindhuraja grants protection to the residents of Ratnavati, and appoints Ratnachuda as the ruler of Vajrankusha's former kingdom.

=== Wedding of Sindhuraja and Shashiprabha ===
In Canto 18, Sindhuraja enters Bhogavati, as the local women admire him, while Ramangada carries the golden lotus taken from Ratnavati. On the way to Shankhapala's palace, he stops at a temple of the god Hatakeshvara (an aspect of Shiva) to sing a hymn. As he enters the palace, he sees Shashiprabha ready for the wedding ceremony. When he puts the golden lotus on Shashiprabha's ear at Malayavati's request, the deer turns into a man. The man explains that he used to be a commander of the guard (pratihara-pala) of Sindhuraja's father Siyaka alias Harsha, and had turned into a deer because of a curse by the sage Kanva.

Sindhraja and Shashiprabha get married. Shankhapala gives Sindhuraja a crystal linga created by the artisan god Tvastar, and featuring Shiva as Ardhanarishvara. Sindhuraja then visits the Shiva temple at Ujjayini, accompanied by Shashiprabha and Ramangada. He then goes to Dhara, which is described as his "family capital", and installs the linga there. He sends Shashikhanda and Ratnachuda to their respective countries, and himself sits on the imperial throne with Shashiprabha by his side.

== Historicity ==
The epic is a fusion of history with mythology, and narrates historical events transformed into a fanciful romantic legend.

Historian V. S. Pathak theorizes that Shashikhanda represents the Northern Shilahara king Aparajita, while Vajrankusa represents the Southern Shilahara king Rattaraja. Ratnavati may be identified with modern Ratnagiri, which may have been the Southern Shilahara capital. Shashikhanda's "curse" may be a metaphor for his previous defeat and exile.

Pathak also believes that the Nagas of the story represent the Sinda dynasty of Karahata (modern Karad). The Naga princess Shashiprabha thus represents Sindhuraja's consort, whose Sinda family claimed descent from the mythical Nagas. The "underworld" represents the area to the south of the Narmada River.

== Legacy ==
The 11th canto of Nava-sahasanka-charita contains the story of the Agnikula origin of the Paramara family. According to this story, in the Vedic period, Vasishtha - the royal priest of the solar king Ikshvaku - had a wish-granting cow. When the warrior-turned-sage Vishvamitra stole this cow, Vasishtha made a ritual sacrifice on Mount Arbuda, and an armed warrior wearing a royal crown sprang from the sacrificial fire (agni). This warrior recaptured the cow, and was named Paramara ("slayer of the enemies") by Vasishtha. The Paramara kings were his descendants.

The epic is thus the oldest source to mention the Agnikula legend, which subsequently became popular among other dynasties. Padmagupta probably invented the legend to fabricate a mythical genealogy for the Paramara dynasty, as all other neighbouring dynasties claimed origins from mythical heroes or gods by this time: the Pratiharas from Lakshmana, the Chahamanas (Chauhans) from Surya (Sun), the Chaulukyas from Brahma's water pot (chaluka), and the Chandelas from Chandra (Moon).

The Paramaras were later recognized as "Rajputs", and the myth of their origin from fire was adopted by other Rajput families. The medieval text Prithviraj Raso states that apart from Paramara, progenitors of three other dynasties - Pratihara, Chaulukya, and Chahamana - were created from fire by Vasishtha. The earlier records of these other dynasties do not mention this myth of origin.

R.K. Gupta and S.R. Bakshi opine that Paramara legend is based on an earlier legend narrated in the Ramayana. According to it, Vasishtha, in a dispute over Kamadhenu, created the ancient non-Aryan tribes of the Sakas, Pahlavas, and Kambojas to fight Visvamitra.
