= Agnivansha =

People who claim descent from the Hindu god Agni

In Indian culture, the Agnivanshi are people who claim descent from Agni, the Vedic god of fire. The Agnivanshi lineage is one of the lineages among the Rajput clans, the others being the Suryavanshi (descended from Surya, the sun god) and the Chandravanshi (descended from Chandra, the moon god). According to medieval legends, there are four Agnivanshi clans: Chauhans (Chahamanas), Pratihar (Pratiharas), Parmars (Paramaras) and Solankis (Chaulukyas).

Apart from Rajputs, several other Indian communities and dynasties have legends of fire-born ancestry. Alf Hiltebeitel theorises that the fire-lineage legends signify a new class of Kshatriya warriors, as opposed to the earlier warriors who claimed descent from the solar and lunar lineages mentioned in the ancient texts. Among the clans now known as the Rajputs, the legend might have been invented by Padmagupta, a 10th-century court poet of the Paramara dynasty. His Nava-sahasanka-charita is the earliest source claiming an Agnivanshi origin for the Paramaras. He might have been motivated by the fact that the Paramaras were the only royal family in their region without a mythical account of heroic or divine origin. The 16th century Rajput bards might have extended the legend to include other imperial dynasties, in order to foster Rajput unity against Muslims.

== Paramara legends ==
Among the dynasties that are now called Rajputs, the Paramara kings of Malwa were the first to claim an Agnikula ("fire clan") ancestry. Several inscriptions and literary works composed during the Paramara era mention this legend. The earliest known source to mention this story is the Nava-sahasanka-charita of the Paramara court poet Padmagupta Parimala. The Sanskrit-language epic was composed during the reign of Sindhuraja (ca. 997-1010). Its version of the legend is as follows:

The Agnikula legend of Nava-Sahasanka-Charita

On Mount Arbuda (Abu), the priest of Ikshvaku royal house (Vashistha) once made a sacred grove. The son of Gadhi (Vishvamitra) stole the wish-granting cow of Vashistha, just like Kartavirya Arjuna had once stole the cow of Jamadagni. The barkcloth on the bosom of Arundhati (Vashistha's wife) became soaked with tears. The earliest of the knowers of Atharva Veda (Vashistha) then made a fire offering with mantras. A hero with a bow, a crown and golden armour emerged from the fire. He brought back Vashistha's cow. The grateful owner of the cow named this hero "Paramara" ("slayer of the enemy"), and gave him the power to rule the entire earth. From this hero, who resembled Manu, sprang the (Paramara) dynasty.

Padmagupta's Nava-sahasanka-charita is based on the life of Sindhuraja, but is of little historical value. The legend is not mentioned in earlier Paramara inscriptions (such as the Harsola copper plates) or literary works (such as Halayudha's Mritasanjivani). Therefore, it appears that Padmagupta invented the legend in late 10th century. By this time, all of the Paramaras' neighbouring dynasties claimed descent from mythical heroes or gods: the Pratiharas from Lakshmana, the Chahamanas (Chauhans) from Surya (Sun), the Chaulukyas from Brahma's water pot (chaluka), and the Chandelas from Chandra (Moon). The Paramaras were the only ones without a legend of mythical origin. This might have motivated Padmagupta to invent a new legend with Sindhuraja's approval. R.K. Gupta and S.R. Bakshi opine that Parmara legend is based on an earlier legend narrated in the Ramayana. According to it, Vasistha, in a dispute over Kamadhenu, created the ancient non-Aryan tribes of the Sakas, Pahlavas, and Kambojas to fight Visvamitra.

The post-Sindhuraja Paramara inscriptions and literary works widely mention the Agnikula myth. The Paramara inscriptions which mention this legend include the Udaipur Prashasti inscription, the Nagpur stone inscription, the Vasantagarh inscription, the Arthuna inscription of Chamundaraja, the Neminath Jain temple inscription, the Donagaragrama inscription, the Patnarayan inscription and the Jainad inscription. Tilaka-Manjari by Dhanapala, a contemporary of the Paramara king Bhoja, also supports this account. Some of the later inscriptions mention the name the dynasty's progenitor as "Dhumaraja" (smoke-king) instead of "Paramara".

== Chauhan accounts ==
The earliest of the Chauhan inscriptions and literary works do not claim Agnivanshi descent. These sources variously state that the dynasty's legendary founder Chahamana was born from Indra's eye, in the lineage of the sage Vatsa, in the solar dynasty and/or during a ritual sacrifice performed by Brahma.

Some recensions of Prithviraj Raso, an epic poem by Chand Bardai, contain a legend similar to the Paramara legend. However, this version does not present the sages Vashistha and Vishwamitra as rivals. It goes like this:

The Agnikula legend of Prithviraj Raso

One day, Agastya, Gautama, Vashistha, Vishwamitra and other great sages started a major sacrificial ceremony on Arbuda (Mount Abu). Demons interrupted the ceremony by polluting it with flesh, blood, bones and urine. To get rid of these demons, Vashistha performed a homa ritual. This led to the appearance of a hero named Pratihara ("door-keeper"), who Vashistha placed on the road leading to the palace. After this, another hero named Chalukka appeared from the hollowed palm of Brahma. Finally, a third hero appeared, who sage named Pavara (or Para-mara, "slayer of the enemy"). However, these three heroes were not able to stop the demons. Vashistha then dug up a new fire pit, and made yet another offering to the fire, to conjure a new hero. This four-armed hero held a sword, a shield, a bow, and an arrow. Vashistha named him Chahavana, performed his coronation with Vedic hymns, and then ordered him to fight the demons. The sage also asked the goddess Ashapura to help the hero. Chahuhvana killed the demon Yantraketu, while the goddess killed the demon Dhumraketu. On seeing this, the other demons fled. Pleased with Chahuvana's bravery, the goddess agreed to be his family deity. Prithviraj Chauhan, the hero of Prithiviraj Raso, was born in this family.

Prithviraj Raso is the earliest source that includes four different Rajput dynasties (not just the Paramaras) in this legend. Scholars such as Dasharatha Sharma and C. V. Vaidya, who analyzed the earliest available copies of Prithviraj Raso, concluded that its original recension did not contain this legend at all. The earliest extant copy of Prithviraj Raso, dated to 15th century, contains only one sentence regarding the origin of Chauhan dynasty: it states that Manikya Rai was the first valiant Chauhan, and he was born from Brahma's sacrifice. R. B. Singh believes that the 16th century poets came up with the legend to foster Rajput unity against the Mughal emperor Akbar.

Adaptions of the Prithviraj Raso legend occur in later works written under the patronage of the various Chauhan dynasties. One notable adaption is found in Hammira Raso (1728), which describes the life of Hammira-deva, the Chauhan king of Ranthambore. It was composed by Jodharaja, a court poet of prince Chandrabhana of Neemrana. Its version of the legend is as follows:

The Agnikula legend of Hammira Raso

Parashurama slaughtered Kshatriyas (warriors) 21 times. The only escapees were those who disguised themselves as women, those who fled leaving behind their swords and those who fell at his feet. The absence of any warriors led to a dark age, where rakshasas (demons) increased in number, Vedas came to be trampled under feet, and Hinduism was forgotten. The sages then visited Parashurama's cave on Mount Abu. There, all the gods, men and nāgas assembled and came up with a plan to destroy the demons. Vashistha erected a fire altar and worshipped Shiva, who appeared before the sages. But the demons disrupted the ceremony by throwing impurities like blood, flesh and garbage on the altar. Twenty sages, including their leader Vashistha, then invoked Brahma and Shiva. They erected a new altar and conducted a fresh ceremony, singing hymns from the Sama Veda. Following this, four sword-bearing warriors emerged from the fire pit, and defeated the demons. Parashurama and Shakti blessed the newly created heroes. Chohan, one of the heroes, was four-armed. The sage Bhrigu told him that he would be protected by the goddess Shakti in his endeavours to kill the demons. The goddess protected Chohan from all dangers: every time he fell at her feet, his strength doubled and he was able to slay the demons. The goddess came to be known as Ashapuri because she fulfilled the hopes ("asha") of the sages.

A slight variation occurs in the writings of Suryamal Misran, the court poet of Bundi. In this version, the various gods create the four heroes on Vashistha's request. According to the bardic tale of the Khichi clan of Chauhans, the Puwar (Paramara) was born from Shiva's essence; the Solankhi (Solanki) or Chaluk Rao (Chaulukya) was born from Brahma's essence; the Pariyar (Parihar) was born from Devi's essence; and the Chahuvan (Chauhan) was born from the fire. The myth also appears with some variations in the Sisana inscription of the Chauhans of Bedla, and the Nainsi ri Khyat.

== Other accounts ==
Dvyasraya-Mahakavya, an account of the Chaulukya dynasty (Solankis) by Hemachandra (c. 1088–1173), mentions the Agnikula legend while describing the origin of the Paramaras. The Chaulukyas knew about the Agnikula legend, but associated it with the Paramaras, not themselves.

The Bhavishya Purana, some of whose portions date as late as the 19th century, also contains the legend with some variations. In this version, the Kanyakubja Brahmins conducted a sacrifice on Mount Abu to appease Brahma. The recital of the Vedic mantras produced four Kshatriya heroes: Samavedin Paramara, Yajurvedin Chahumana (Chauhan), Trivedin Chalukya and Atharvavedin Parihara (Pratihara).

Abu'l Fazl mentions another variation of the legend in his Ain-i-Akbari: In 761 BCE, a sage called Mahabaha kindled a flame and established a fire temple, which started attracting several devotees. Later, the Buddhists, unhappy with these Brahminical rites, managed to get an order prohibiting this style of worship. The fire temple devotees then prayed to seek a hero who would overthrow Buddhism and restore their traditional faith. The "Supreme Justice" then conjured a hero from the now-cold fire temple. This hero, called Dhananjaya (or Dhanji), attained power in a short time and restored the Brahminical rites. He came to Malwa from Deccan, and established a government there. When his fifth-generation descendant Putaraja died childless, the nobles elected one Aditya Ponwar as his successor. The Paramara dynasty descended from Ponwar.

== Interpretations ==
Padmagupta's legend appears to be based on a similar story mentioned in Balakanda of the Ramayana (1:53:18 — 1:54:3). In this story, Vishvamitra (initially a Kshatriya) snatches Vashistha's Kamadhenu cow (called "Shabala"). With Vashistha's permission, the cow creates the non-Indo-Aryan warriors who defeat Vishvamitra's army. These warriors include the Barbaras, the Kambojas, the Pahlavas, the Shakas, and the Yavanas. The Mahabharata repeats this legend with some variations. In this version, the stolen cow (called "Nandini") retaliates by creating the various mleccha tribes from different parts of her body. Seeing the power of the Brahmin Vashistha, Vishvamitra decides to become a Brahmin as well.

Some colonial-era historians interpreted the Agnikula myth to suggest a foreign origin for the Agnivanshi Rajputs. According to this theory, the foreign ancestors of these Rajputs came to India after the decline of the Gupta Empire around 5th century. They were admitted in the Hindu caste system after performing a fire ritual. James Tod, who relied on bardic legends, was the first to propose this theory. He speculated that the Agnivashi Rajputs, who were of "good-stature and fair", could not have descended from the "dark, diminutive and ill-favoured" aboriginal natives of India. He proposed that their ancestors were Scythians and other groups residing beyond the Hindu Kush mountains. A. M. T. Jackson proposed a similar theory, but argued that the Rajputs had originated from Gurjars, who according to him, came to India as part of invading hordes. The basis for his theory was the Agnivanshi myth, and the prevalence of surnames such as Pavar (Parmar) and Chavan (Chauhan) among Gurjars. The theory was further supported by other British scholars as well as some Indian scholars, such as D. R. Bhandarkar. William Crooke theorised that the demons referred to in the Agnikula legend were Buddhist rivals of the Brahmins. He argued that the Kshatriya descent was based on status rather than descent, and therefore Brahmins conducted a purification or initiation fire ritual to raise the status of foreign warriors who helped them repress the Buddhists.

The foreign-origin theory has been criticised by several later scholars. Alf Hiltebeitel states that the colonial historians saw the foreign-origin theory as a way of justifying their own colonial invasion. R. B. Singh criticises Indian supporters of the theory for having failed to see the "subtle game" of the colonial historians.

Hiltebeitel argues that the Ramayana story cannot be the origin of the Agnikula myth, because it has nothing to do with birth from fire. There are other mythological legends involving sages and birth of warriors, which do not support the foreign-origin theory. For example, the Ramayana also mentions that Vashistha and Rishyasringa performed a ceremony that resulted in the birth of Rama and his three brothers. The Pratisarga-Parvan of Bhavishya Purana mentions a legend according to which the Brahmins destroyed the mlecchas by pulling them into a sacrificial fire pit (rather than creating them from it). Besides, the fire-origin legend is not unique to the Rajputs. There are several south Indian legends of fire-born dynasties and communities:

- The Tamil work Purananuru, which predates the Paramaras, mentions a fire-born chief: the ruler of Tuvarai (identified with Dvārakā). This ruler, who was an ancestor of Pulikatimal Irunkovel of Arayam, came out of "the sacrificial fire-pit of the Rishi".
- An inscription issued during the reign of Kulothunga Chola III (r. c. 1178–1218) also mentions a fire-born legend. According to it, the Surutiman ("left-hand") castes were created from the agni-kunda (fire pit) to protect the sacrificial ceremony of the sage Kashyapa. They migrated from Antarvedi to the Chola country as attendants of migrant Brahmins, during the reign of the emperor Arindama.
- The legends of the Telugu speaking castes Balijas (including their offshoots Kavarais and Janappans / Yaga Kshatriyas) and Togatas claim that their ancestors were born from sacrificial fire-pits.
- The Vanniyar community has historical legends from 17th century copper plates and temple inscriptions that their ancestor Rudra Vanniya Maharaja (or Vira-Vanniyan) was born from the flames of a fire sacrifice, *An inscription issued during the reign of Kulothunga Chola III mentions the Pannattars (Palli-Nattars) of 79 Nadus as those who emerged from the sacrifice of Sambu Maharishi and those who were entrusted to guard the capital of the Cholas. This sacrifice was performed by the sage Sambu to ward off the demons Vatapi and Mahi. Vira-Vanniyan had four sons, and he defeated the demons with the help of the goddess Durga. Certain Merchant and Artisan castes have fire born myths as well. . .
- The 15th century Tamil Mahabharata of Villiputtur Alvar makes three references to Agnivanshi (fire), Suryavanshi (solar) and Chandravanshi (lunar) dynasties. One particular segment describes the Chola king as from the solar dynasty, the Pandyan king as from the lunar dynasty and the Chera king as from the fire dynasty. The more ancient Silappatikaram alludes to the solar ancestry of the Cholas and the lunar ancestry of the Pandyas, but remains silent on the ancestry of the Cheras. The Tiruvilayatar Puranam (or Thiruvilaiyadal Puranam), possibly from the 17th century, repeats the Villiputtur Alvar's account.

Hiltebeitel notes that the common theme among all these "fire-origin" legends is not the theft of a cow: rather, it is the creation of a new order of Kshatriyas (as opposed to the traditional solar and lunar Kshatriyas mentioned in the ancient sources). Hiltebeitel further theorises that the Agnikula myth is of south Indian origin, and may have been transmitted to northern India by the feudatories of the Pallavas and the Chalukyas. He suggests that the Tamil-language Silappatikaram legend is "an Agnikula myth waiting to be realized". It mentions solar and lunar ancestry of the Cholas and Pandyas respectively, but remains silent on the ancestry of the Cheras. According to a legend in this text, after the destruction of the Chola and the Pandya capitals (the latter by agni or fire), it is the Chera king who redeems the royals by establishing the worship of Kannagi. Besides the south Indian legends of fire-origin, Hiltebeitel also connects the Chaulukyas (Solanki Rajputs) to the south Indian Chalukyas of Kalyani in his support. Before the popularisation of the Agnikula myth, both these dynasties claimed origin from Brahma's chaluka (folded palm or water-pot). The Guhilot Rajputs of Mewar as well as the Chaulukyas of Gujarat are known to have employed Brahmins from Deccan for fabricating their myths of origin. D. C. Sircar also suggested that the Paramara court poet Padmagupta might also have been a native of southern India. According to Paramara inscriptions, his patron Vakpati Munja had achieved military successes in southern India.

According to K. N. Seth, the foreign-origin theory is weakened by the fact that the Agnikula legend is not mentioned in the earliest of the Paramara records (such as the Harsola copper plates). Moreover, the earliest Paramara-era accounts do not mention the other Rajput clans as fire-born. The early Chauhan dynasties were centered around Ajmer-Pushkar region, and their association with Mount Abu is a later invention.

R. B. Singh argues that if the ancestors of Rajputs were the Indo-Aryan natives of north-western India, Tod's claim of stark differences between the appearances of the Scythians and the natives is misleading, as both the groups have Indo-European origins.
