= Arikesarin =

Shilahara ruler from 1015 to 1022

11th Shilahara ruler
- Reign: c. 1015 – c. 1022
- Predecessor: Vajjada II
- Successor: Chhittaraja
- Dynasty: Shilahara
- Father: Aparajita

Arikesarin was Shilahara ruler of north Konkan branch from 1015 to 1022.

Vajjada was succeeded by his younger brother Arikesarin alias Keshideva I. While yet a prince, he had taken part in the Paramara king Sindhuraja's campaign in South Kosala (Chhattisgadh) and had also marched with an army to Saurashtra where he worshipped Someshvara (Somanatha) after his conquests.

It was during the reign of Arikesarin that Konkan was invaded by the Paramara king Bhoja. Two of his grants made in celebration of the victory are dated in A. D. 1020, one in January and the other in September of the year. (Dept. Gazetteer: 2002)

== See also ==
- Shilahara
