= Sindhuraja =

10th Century Paramaran King

- Kumara-Narayana, Nava-Sahasanka

King of Malwa
- Reign: c. 990s
- Predecessor: Vakpati Munja
- Successor: Bhoja
- Spouse: Queen Savitri (According to Bhoja-Prabandha), Queen Shashiprabha(According to Nava-Sahasanka-Charita)
- Issue: Bhoja Udayaditya
Regnal name
- Sindhu-raja-deva
- Dynasty: Paramara
- Father: Siyaka
- Mother: Queen Vadaja
- Religion: Hinduism

Sindhuraja (IAST: Sindhurāja) was an Indian king from the Paramara dynasty, who ruled the Kingdom of Malwa in the late 10th century. He was the younger brother of Munja, and the father of Bhoja.

== Background ==
No inscriptions issued by Sindhuraja have been discovered, although he is mentioned in several later Paramara inscriptions, including inscriptions of Bhoja. Much of the information about his life comes from Nava-sahasanka-charita, an eulogistic composition by his court poet Padmagupta. The work is a fusion of history and mythology.

Sindhuraja succeeded his brother Munja as the Paramara king. According to the 14th-century poet Merutunga's Prabandha-Chintamani, Sindhuraja was the biological son of Simhadantabhatta (Siyaka), while Munja was an adopted child. However, historians doubt the authenticity of this claim. Merutunga also states that Munja was succeeded by Sindhuraja's son Bhoja. However, according to Nava-Sahasanka-Charita and epigraphic evidence, Sindhuraja was the successor of Munja.

Sindhuraja adopted the titles "Kumara-Narayana" and "Nava-Sahasanka". Padmagupta also uses the titles Avantishvara (lord of Avanti), Malava-raja (king of Malava), and Paramamahibhrta for him. His other names include Sindhula and Sindhala. In the inscriptions of his successor Bhoja, he has been called "Sindhu-raja-deva".

== Period of reign ==
The exact period of Sindhuraja's reign is not certain. His predecessor Munja died some time between 994 CE and 998 CE.

The Modasa copper plates (1010 CE) are the earliest historical record of his successor Bhoja's reign. The Chintamani-Sarnika (1055 CE) was composed by Bhoja's court poet Dasabala. Based on this, scholars such as Pratipal Bhatia assign Bhoja's reign to 1010-1055 CE, and therefore Sindhuraja's reign to 997-1010 CE. However, Merutunga's Prabandha-Chintamani states that Bhoja ruled for 55 years. Assuming this information to be correct, scholars such as Kailash Chandra Jain assume Bhoja's reign as 1000-1055 CE, and Sindhuraja's reign as 995-1000 CE.

== Military career ==
Tilaka-Manjari, a work composed by the Paramara court poet Dhanapala eulogizes Sindhuraja as a great hero and "a lion for the line of rutting elephants of Indra". The Nava-sahasanka-charita as well as the Udaipur prashasti inscription of a later Paramara king state that Sindhuraja defeated the king of Kuntala. This suggests that he recovered the territories on the Paramara kingdom's southern frontier, that his predecessor Munja had lost to the Kalyani Chalukya king Tailapa II. However, it is not clear if Sindhuraja fought against Tailapa's successor Satyashraya.

The Nava-sahasanka-charita narrates a partly-mythological story about Sindhuraja defeating the demon king Vajrankusha to win over the Naga princess Shashiprabha; in this campaign he is supported by the vidyadhara leader Shashikhanda. Historian V. S. Pathak theorizes that Shashikhanda represents the Northern Shilahara king Aparajita, while Vajrankusa represents the Southern Shilahara king Rattaraja. Pathak also believes that the Nagas of the story represent the Sinda dynasty of Karahata (modern Karad), which claimed descent from the mythical Nagas.

The text credits Sindhuraja with several other victories, including those over the countries of Hunas, Vagada, Murala, Lata, Aparanta, and Kosala:

- The claim of victory over the Hunas may be based on his participation in an anti-Huna campaign of his predecessor Munja, who is also credited with subjugating the Hunas in the Paramara sources.
- The victory over Vagada may be a reference to his subjugation of Chandapa, whose predecessor Kanka ruled the Vagada region as a Paramara subordinate, and who may have tried to assert independence.
- Muralas is generally identified as present-day Kerala, and it is unlikely that Sindhuraja advanced that far in the south. It is possible that a ruler from this region fought against Sindhuraja as a subordinate or an ally of the Chalukyas or the Shilaharas.
- The ruler of Lata appears to have been the Lata Chalukya ruler Gongiraja.
- Aparanta or northern Konkan was ruled by the Shilaharas. The claim of Sindhuraja's conquest of this region seems to be conventional exaggeration, as the Shilahara prince Aparajita is believed to have participated in one of his campaigns as an ally (see Nava-sahasanka-charita story above). Aparajita, in his 997 CE Bhadan copper-plate inscription, regrets the overthrow of the Rashtrakutas by the Chalukyas, and may have formed an alliance with the Paramaras to defend himself against the Chalukyas.
- If the claim of victory against Kosala is true, it may be a reference to Sindhuraja's victory over the Ratnapura Kalachuri ruler Kalingaraja or the Somavamshi ruler Yayati Mahashivagupta.

The 1151 CE Vadnagar prashasti inscription of the Chaulukya dynasty of Gujarat states that their king Chamundaraja led an army against Sindhuraja. According to the inscription, when Sindhuraja saw Chamundaraja's army from a distance, he fled with his elephant forces, and lost his well-established fame. It appears that the ruler of Lata was a vassal of Chamundaraja, and Sindhuraja's invasion of Lata prompted Chamundraja to come to his rescue. The 14th-century text Kumarapala-Charita states that Chamundaraja killed Sindhuraja in a battle. The text was written by the Jain writer Jayasimha Suri, who was patronized by the Chaulukyas of Gujarat. However, the historicity of this claim is doubtful, since it does not appear in the earlier sources.

The 1092 CE Sasbahu Temple inscription of the Kachchhapaghata ruler Mahipala states that his ancestor Kirtiraja defeated the prince of Malava, whose soldiers fled the battlefield, leaving behind their spears. Earlier scholars identified the defeated king as Sindhuraja's son and successor Bhoja, but it is more likely that this king was Sindhuraja.
