= Marsimha =

- Dynasty: Shilahara

Marasimha (1050 CE - 1075 CE) succeeded Gonka. He was not very ambitious. In a copper plate grant describes the fort of Kilagila as his capital. Guvala II succeeded his father in 1057 CE. However, till 1110 CE the history of the Shilahara family becomes complicated as all princes are mentioned as kings.

== See also ==
- Shilahara
