= Goggiraja =

6th Shilahara Ruler
- Reign: c. 930 – c. 945 CE
- Predecessor: Jhanjha
- Successor: Vajjada I
- House: Shilahara
- Father: Vappuvanna

Goggiraja was Shilahara ruler of north Konkan branch from 930 CE – 945 CE.

Jhanjha was succeeded by his younger brother Goggiraja, but about him and his successor Vajjada I, Vajjada was followed by his brother Chhadvaideva, who is omitted in all later records, probably because he was an usurper. (Dept. Gazetteer: 2002)

== References and bibliography ==
- Bhandarkar R.G. (1957): Early History of Deccan, Sushil Gupta (I) Pvt Ltd, Calcutta.
- Fleet J.F (1896) :The Dynasties of the Kanarese District of The Bombay Presidency, Written for the Bombay Gazetteer .
- Department of Gazetteer, Govt of Maharashtra (2002) : Itihaas : Prachin Kal, Khand -1 (Marathi)
- Department of Gazetteer, Govt of Maharashtra (1960) : Kolhapur District Gazetteer
- Department of Gazetteer, Govt of Maharashtra (1964) : Kolaba District Gazetteer
- Department of Gazetteer, Govt of Maharashtra (1982) : Thane District Gazetteer
- A.S.Altekar (1936) : The Silaharas of Western India

== See also ==
- Shilahara
