= Jhanjha =

5th Shilahara Ruler
- Reign: c. 910 – c. 930 CE
- Predecessor: Vappuvanna
- Successor: Goggiraja
- House: Shilahara
- Father: Vappuvanna

Jhanjha was Shilahara ruler of north Konkan branch from 910 CE – 930 CE.

Vappuvanna was followed by Jhanjha . He is mentioned by Al-Masudi as ruling over Samur (i.e., Chaul in the Kolaba district) in 916 CE. He was a very devout Shaiva. He is said to have built twelve temples of Shiva and named them after himself. According to an unpublished copper-plate in the possession of Pandit Bhagwanlal, Jhanjha had a daughter named Lasthiyavva who was married to Bhillam, the fourth king of the Chandor .(Dept. Gazetteer: 2002)

== See also ==
- Shilahara
