= Aparajita =

9th Shilahara Ruler
- Reign: c. 975 – c. 1010 CE
- Predecessor: Chhadvaideva
- Successor: Vajjada II
- Issue: Vajjada II; Arikesarin
- Dynasty: Shilahara
- Father: Vajjada I
- Religion: Jainism

Aparajita was an able Shilahara ruler of north Konkan branch from 975 CE – 1010 CE.

Chhadvaideva was followed by his nephew Aparajita, the son of Vajjada. Aparajita was an ambitious king. He sought to extend his sphere of influence by alliance with the mighty kings of other countries. He probably represents the Vidyadhara king Shikhandaketu, mentioned in the Nava-sahasanka-charita of Padmagupta; this king sent his son Shashikhanda to render help to the Paramara king Sindhuraja (993 CE 1010 CE) in his invasion of South Kosala at the request of the Naga king of Bastar.

Aparajita's extensive conquests, his alliance with the Paramaras, his assumption of grandiloquent titles and his subsequent refusal to recognise the Later Chalukya suzerainty led to a Chalukya invasion of his kingdom. Gadayuddha, composed by the Chalukya court poet Ranna, by order of the Chalukya king Taila II, prince Satyashraya chased the Konkaneshvara (the ruler of Konkan i.e. Aparajita) to the sea. Satyashraya pressed as far as the Shilahara capital Puri. Aparajita ultimately acknowledged the Chalukya suzerainty, as attested by a 997 Bhadana inscription which gives his title as Mahamandaleshvara.

== See also ==
- Shilahara
