= Keshideva II =

Keshideva II was Shilahara ruler of north Konkan branch from 1200 CE – 1245 CE.

Aparaditya's successor Keshideva II is known from two stone inscriptions. The earlier of them is dated in Shaka 1125 CE and was found at Mandavi in the Vasai Taluka. (Dept. Gazetteer: 2002)

== References & Bibliography ==
- Bhandarkar R.G. (1957): Early History of Deccan, Sushil Gupta (I) Pvt Ltd, Calcutta.
- Fleet J.F (1896) :The Dynasties of the Kanarese District of The Bombay Presidency, Written for the Bombay Gazetteer .
- Department of Gazetteer, Govt of Maharashtra (2002) : Itihaas : Prachin Kal, Khand -1 (Marathi)
- Department of Gazetteer, Govt of Maharashtra (1960) : Kolhapur District Gazetteer
- Department of Gazetteer, Govt of Maharashtra (1964) : Kolaba District Gazetteer
- Department of Gazetteer, Govt of Maharashtra (1982) : Thane District Gazetteer
- A.S.Altekar (1936) : The Silaharas of Western India

== See also ==
- Shilahara
