= Vijayaditya I =

Vijayaditya I (died 1175) was a king of the Shilahara dynasty. He joined in a conspiracy which was being formed by Bijjala, a minister of his feudal Lord Taila III, and in the revolution that ensued the Chalukya supremacy came to an end circa 1153ad. The Satara plates of his son claim that Vijayaditya I reinstated the fallen lords of Sthanaka and Goa. He was the senior contemporary of Basava and other Shivasharanas. Vijayaditya I had to fight hard to wrest independence from Kalachuri Bijjala, the new sovereign but it was only after the death of Bijjala after the Kalyana revolution in 1168ad, that Vijayaditya I could assume full sovereignty.

== See also ==
- Shilahara
