= Bhoja I (Shilahara dynasty) =

Shilahara king

Bhoja I was a medieval Shilahara king of Southern Maharashtra (Kolhapur) on the west coast of India.

On the death of Guhala 11 in 1055 CE, Bhallala and Bhoja I must have ruled the kingdom. Achugi II, the Sinda ruler of Yelburga, is said to have repulsed a certain Bhoja I who can be only the Shilahara Bhoja I.
