= Pullashakti =

2nd Shilahara Ruler
- Reign: c. 825 – c. 850 CE
- Predecessor: Kapardin I
- Successor: Kapardin II
- Issue: Kapardin II
- House: Shilahara
- Father: Kapardin I

Pullashakti was Shilahara ruler of north Konkan branch from 825 CE – 850 CE.

Kapardin I was succeeded by his son Pullashakti who has left a much-abraded inscription in Kanheri cave No. 73. In the Kanheri cave inscription Pullashakti is called Mahasamanta and is described as the lord of Puri-Konkan a, which he had obtained by the favour of the Rashtrakuta king Amoghavarsha I. The inscription records the endowment of 24 dramas made by one Vishnugupta for the repairs of the cave as well as for the raiment and books of the monks dwelling in Krishnagiri (Kanheri).(Dept. Gazetteer: 2002)

== See also ==
- Shilahara
