= Harsola copper plates =

949 CE copper-plate inscriptions from Gujarat, India

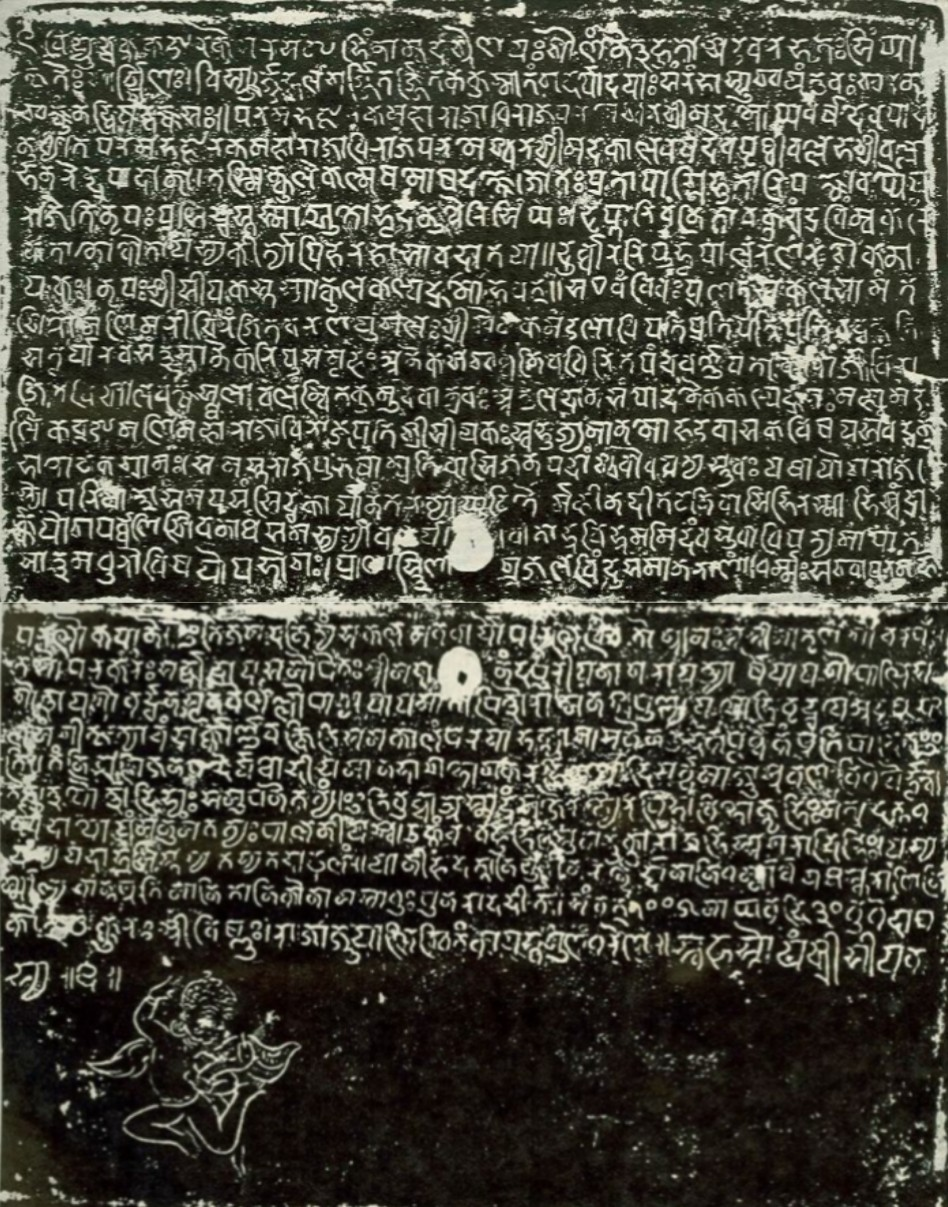
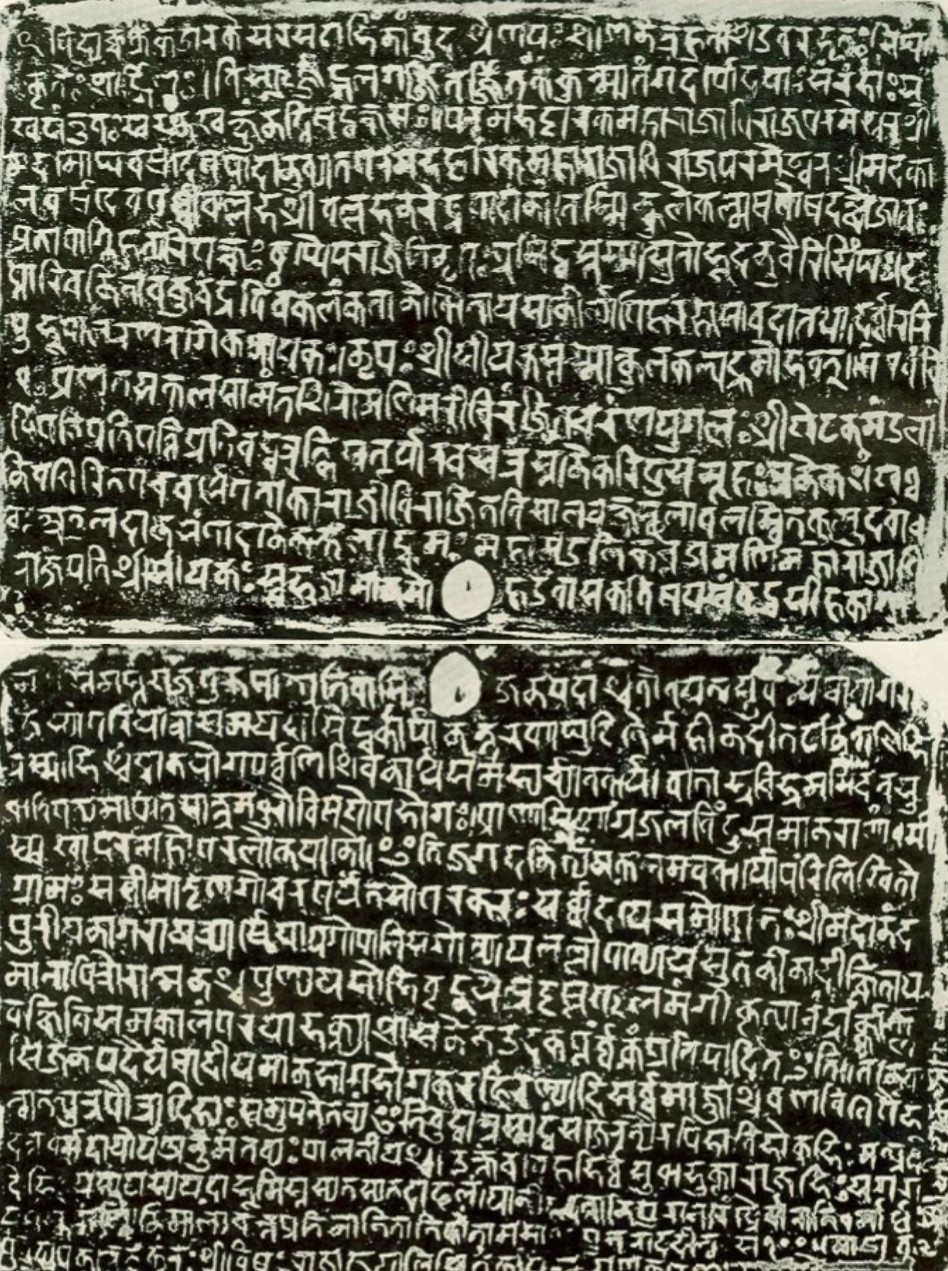
- Grant A and Grant B (top to bottom)

General Information
- Dynasty: Paramara
- Material: Copper
- Inscription type: Land grant
- Script: Nagari
- Language: Sanskrit
- Dimensions: 21.5 x 13 cm (Grant A Plate 1); 21 x 8.5 cm (Grant A Plate 2); 20 x 13 cm (Grant B Plates 1 and 2)

Discovery
- Place found: Harsol
- Date discovered: 1922–1923
- Date created: 31 January 949 (30 Magha 1005 VS)

Contents of the Inscription
- Author: Gunadhana
- King mentioned: Siyaka
- Names of people mentioned: Lallopadhyaya; Nina Dikshita

Location and Status

The Harsola copper plates are a set of two 949 CE Indian inscriptions that record the grants of two villages to a Nagar Brahmin father-son duo. The grants were issued by the Paramara king Siyaka II. The copper plates were discovered in Harsol (or Harsola) in present-day Gujarat state.

Besides the Paramara ancestors of Siyaka, the inscription mentions men with Rashtrakuta titles. Based on their identification as Rashtrakuta kings, some historians have theorized that Paramaras descended from the Rashtrakutas. However, others have argued that these men were Paramara rulers who had adopted Rashtrakuta titles to portray themselves as successors of the Rashtrakutas in Malwa.

== History ==
In the early 20th century, the plates were in the possession of a Visnagar Brahmin named Bhatta Magan Motiram, who was a resident of Harsol. It is not known when and how the plates came to be in his possession. According to Keshavlal Dhruv, the first two plates ("Grant A") were found joined together by a ring, and the other two plates ("Grant B") were found loose. There is a Garuda symbol (the Paramara royal emblem) on only one of the plates, and the two grants were issued to a father-son duo by the same king on the same day. Therefore, it can be inferred that originally, all the plates must have been joined together.

D. B. Diskalkar noticed these plates in 1922-23, and published a transcript in a Gujarati journal Puratattva. Later, he and K. N. Dikshit published a revised transcript with translation in Epigraphia Indica Volume XIX (1927).

== Content ==
The copper plates are rectangular in shape, and are inscribed only one side. The first copper plate of Grant A is 21.5 cm x 13 cm in size, and includes 16 lines. The second plate is of 21 cm x 8.5 cm in size, and contains 11 lines. Both the Grant B copper plates measure about 20 cm x 13 cm, and contain 16 and 13 lines respectively.

Both the grants are written in Sanskrit language and Nagari script. The text is a mix of prose and poetry.

=== Introduction ===
Minus the formal portion about the actual grant and the Garuda emblem, the contents of the two grants is exactly same. Both the grants open with a customary symbol, and a verse invoking blessings of the Varaha avatar of Vishnu.

The first plate depicts a flying Garuda holding a snake in its right arm; the left hand is raised to strike the snake. The beautifully incised Garuda image in human form with wings on the grants, is considered to be the earlier form of drawing which came to be known as the Jain style as used in Jain manuscripts.

=== List of kings ===
Next, the inscriptions mention Amoghavarsha-deva, whose titles are Paramabhattakara, Maharajadhiraja and Parmaveshvara. This is followed by the name of his successor Akalavarsha-deva, whose titles are Prithvi-vallabha and Sri-vallabha.

The mention of these kings is followed by the expression tasmin kule ("in that family"), although the name of the family is not mentioned. According to scholars such as K. N. Dikshit, DB Diskalkar and H V Trivedi, the name of the family appears to have been omitted because of an oversight.

Next, the inscription lists three kings with conventional descriptions:

- Bappairaja or Vappairaja
- Vairisimha, son of Bappairaja
- Siyaka, son of Vairisimha

=== The grants ===
This part of the inscription records the grants of two villages in Mohadavasaka vishaya (district) to a father-son duo. The donees were Nagar Brahmins of Anandapura, who belonged to the Gopali gotra.

- Grant A: Kumbharotaka village to Lallopadhyaya, son of Govardhana
- Grant B: Sihaka village to Nina Dikshita, son of Lallopadhyaya

Both the grants were issued by Siyaka, who is described as Maharajadhiraja and sāmanta-cūḍa-maṇi ("the crest jewel among the feudatories"). The grants were issued on the banks of the Mahi River, on 31 January 949 CE (30 Magha 1005 VS).

The inscription mentions that Siyaka assembled the residents of the Kumbharotaka, Sihaka and other neighbouring villages. In their presence, he made perpetual grants of the villages for religious merit and for his family's fame. The inscription lists the instructions for the villagers to offer the donees and their descendants the shares of the produce, royalties, taxes and gold. This is followed by imprecatory verses to curse anyone who revokes the grants. The inscription states that the grants were made at the request of the ruler of Khetaka mandala, after Siyaka's return from a successful campaign against Yogaraja.

The dapaka or the officer-in-charge of registering the grants was a Thakkura named Vishnu. Both the grants were written by a Kayastha named Gunadhara. Each grant ends with a sign manual of Siyaka.

== Identification of people ==
"Amoghavarsha" and "Akalavarsha" were titles used by the rulers of the Rashtrakuta dynasty. Therefore, some historians, such as D. C. Ganguly have identified these terms used in the inscriptions as the names of Rashtrakuta kings, most probably Amoghavarsha I (800–878 CE) and his son Krishna II (878–914 CE). Ganguly further theorizes that Siyaka's grandfather Vakpati I was a patrilinear descendant of the Rashtrakutas. However, there is a lacuna before the words tasmin kule ("in that family") in the inscription, and therefore, Ganguly's suggestion is a pure guess in absence of any concrete evidence. Critics of this theory also argue that the Rashtrakuta titles in these inscriptions refer to Paramara rulers, who had assumed these titles to portray themselves as the legitimate successors of the Rashtrakutas in the Malwa region. The Rashtrakutas had similarly adopted the titles such as Prithvi-vallabha, which had been used by the preceding Chalukya rulers. Historian Dasharatha Sharma points out that the Paramaras claimed the mythical Agnikula origin by the tenth century: had they really been descendants of the Rashtrakutas, they would not have forgotten their prestigious royal origin within a generation. K. N. Dikshit and D. B. Diskalkar, who edited the Harsola inscription, alternatively suggested that the Paramaras may have descended from a Rashtrakuta princess. However, this cannot be said with certainty, because a portion of the original grant is missing.

The next three kings mentioned in the inscription are the Paramara kings, who may have been Rashtrakuta vassals in Malwa:

- Bappairaja or Vappairaja is the Prakrit form of Vakpatiraja, identified with Vakpati I
- Vairisimha is Vairisimha I, the father of the issuer
- Siyaka is Siyaka II, the issuer of the inscription

The last names of the donees indicate that these were not hereditary surnames in the 10th century. The donees had two different last names - "Upadhyaya" and "Dikshita" - although both were Nagar Brahmins from same locality and gotra, being a father-son duo.

== Identification of places ==
Khetaka is identified as the area around the present-day Kheda. The identity of its ruler is not certain, but he could be the successor of Prachanda of Brahmavak family. According to the 910 CE Kapadvanj grant, the Rashtrakuta king Akalavarsha made Prachanda the in-charge of the Khetaka mandala.

The identity of Yogaraja is also uncertain: he may be a Chavda chief or the Chaulukya chief Avantivarman Yogaraja II. Both Chavdas and Chalukyas of Gujarat were vassals of the Pratiharas, and Siyaka may have led an expedition against either of them as a feudatory of the Rashtrakutas.

Mohadavasaka (the district in which the donated villages were located) is identified with present-day Modasa. The villages - Kumbharotaka and Sihaka - are identified with the modern villages of Kamrod and Sika. Anandapura, the native place of the donees, is identified with Vadnagar. Shivanatha, the place where the king encamped, may be same as Sarnal.
