= Harsol =

Town in Gujarat, India

Coordinates: 23.36°N 73.02°E

Harsol (also spelled Harsola, ancient Harshapura) is a small town in the Talod taluka of the Sabarkantha district of Gujarat, India. This town has its importance for Harsol inscription, which is related with the Paramara King Siyaka II (also called Harsha).
