= Kapardin I =

1st Shilahara Ruler
- Reign: c. 800 – c. 825 CE
- Successor: Pullashakti
- Issue: Pullashakti
- House: Shilahara
- Father: Sangmewara
- Mother: Rukmina

Kapardin I was Shilahara ruler of North Konkan branch from c. 800 CE – 825 CE.

He was the first known Shilahara king of North Konkan, was placed in charge of the country by the Rashtrakuta king Govinda III. Since then North Konkan came to be known as Kapardi-dvipa or Kavadi-dvipa. The capital of this branch was Puri, after which the country was called Puri-Konkan . Their capital seems to have been Puri and their places of note were Hamjaman probably Sanjan in Dahanu, Thane (Shristhanak), Sopara (Shurparak), Chaul (Chemuli), Lonad (Lavanatata) and than. As the Yadavas call themselves lords of the excellent city of Dvaravatipura or Dwarka and the Kadambas call themselves lords of the excellent city of Banavasipura or Banavasi, so the Shilaharas call themselves lords of the excellent city of Tagarapura or Tagar. This title would furnish a clue to the origin of the Shilaharas it unfortunately, the site of Tagar was not uncertain. From numerous references and grants the Thane Shilaharas seem to have been worshippers of Shiva. (Dept. Gazetteer: 2002)

== See also ==
- Shilahara
