= Vajjada II =

10th Shilahara Ruler
- Reign: c. 1010 – c. 1015 CE
- Predecessor: Aparajita
- Successor: Arikesarin
- House: Shilahara
- Father: Aparajita

Vajjada II was Shilahara ruler of north Konkan branch from 1010 CE – 1015 CE.

Aparajita was succeeded by his son Vajjada II, about whom only conventional praise is given in the records of his successors. An inscription from Hangal, however, tells us that Kundaladevi, the queen of the Kadamba king Chhattadeva (Shashthadeva II) (1005 CE - 1055 CE) was the daughter of the king Vachavya of Thani, i.e., Thane. As Dr. Altekar conjectured this king of Thane was probably the Shilahara king Vajjada II.(Dept. Gazetteer: 2002)

== See also ==
- Shilahara
