= Jatiga II =

First ruling king of the Shilahara dynasty

Jatiga II (1000 CE - 1020 CE) was the first ruling king of the Shilahara dynasty. His reign can be placed between 1000 and 1020 CE as his grandson King Marasimha is known to be ruling in 1058 CE The records of King Marasimha mention him as Tagranagara Bhopalaka and Pamaladurgadrisinha which indicate that he had defeated the Chalukyas who were formerly ruling over portions of Kolhapur State, and held the fort of Panhala, thus establishing his rule over the area.

== References & Bibliography ==
- Bhandarkar R.G. (1957): Early History of Deccan, Sushil Gupta (I) Pvt Ltd, Calcutta.
- Fleet J.F (1896) :The Dynasties of the Kanarese District of The Bombay Presidency, Written for the Bombay Gazetteer .
- Department of Gazetteer, Govt of Maharashtra (2002) : Itihaas : Prachin Kal, Khand -1 (Marathi)
- Department of Gazetteer, Govt of Maharashtra (1960) : Kolhapur District Gazetteer
- Department of Gazetteer, Govt of Maharashtra (1964) : Kolaba District Gazetteer
- Department of Gazetteer, Govt of Maharashtra (1982) : Thane District Gazetteer
- A.S.Altekar (1936) : The Silaharas of Western India

== See also ==
- Shilahara
