= Siyaka =

King of Malwa from 948 to 972

- Maharajadhirajapati

King of Malwa
- Reign: 948–972
- Predecessor: Position established
- Successor: Vakpati II (Munja)

Vassal of the Rashtrakutas
- Reign: 940–948
- Predecessor: Vairisimha II
- Successor: Position abolished
- Monarch: Krishna III
- Spouse: Queen Vadaja
- Issue: Vakpati II (Munja) Sindhuraja
Regnal name
- Harsha-Simha
- Dynasty: Paramara
- Father: Vairisimha II
- Religion: Hinduism

Siyaka (IAST: Sīyaka; reigned c. 949–972), also known as Harsha (IAST: Harṣa), was the king of Malwa, who ruled in west-central India. He appears to have been the first independent ruler of the Paramara dynasty.

Siyaka is the earliest Paramara ruler known from his own inscriptions, which have been discovered in present-day Gujarat, and suggest that he was once a feudatory of the Rashtrakutas of Manyakheta. After the death of the Rashtrakuta emperor Krishna III, he fought against the new king Khottiga, and sacked the Rashtrakuta capital Manyakheta in c. 972 CE. This ultimately led to the decline of the Rashtrakutas, and established the Paramaras as a sovereign power.

== Background ==
Harsola copper plates of Siyaka
Harsola Grant A	Harsola Grant B

Siyaka was the son of Vairisimha II. The Harsola copper-plate inscriptions issued by Siyaka are dated 31 January 949. Based on this, it can be inferred that Siyaka must have ascended the Paramara throne sometime before January 949 CE.

== Names and titles ==
In his own inscriptions, as well as the inscriptions of his successors Munja and Bhoja, he is called "Siyaka". In Udaipur prashasti inscription (which mentions an earlier king called Siyaka), as well as the Arthuna inscription, the predecessor of Munja has been called Harsha (or Shri Harsha-deva). Therefore, modern historians also refer to him as Siyaka II to distinguish him from Siyaka I mentioned in the Udaipur inscription; some scholars believe that Siyaka I is a fictional person.

Merutunga, in his Prabandha-Chintamani, names the king as Simha-danta-bhata (alternatively Simha-bhata). According to one theory, "Siyaka" is the Prakrit corruption of the Sanskrit "Simhaka". Georg Bühler suggested that the full name of the king was Harsha-simha, and both parts of this name were used to refer to him.

== Military career ==
By the time of Siyaka's ascention to the Paramara throne, the once-powerful Gurjara-Pratiharas had declined in power, because of attacks from the Rashtrakutas and the Chandelas. Siyaka's 949 CE Harsola inscriptions suggests that he was a feudatory of the Rashtrakuta ruler Krishna III. However, the same inscription also mentions the high-sounding Maharajadhirajapati as one of Siyaka's titles. Based on this, K. N. Seth believes that Siyaka's acceptance of the Rashtrakuta lordship was nominal. Seth also theorizes that Siyaka was originally a Pratihara vassal, but shifted his allegiance to the Rashtrakutas as the Pratihara power declined.

=== Yogaraja ===
The inscriptions of Siyaka are the earliest known Paramara inscriptions: they have been discovered in present-day Gujarat, and therefore, it appears that the Paramaras were connected with Gujarat in their early years. The Harsola inscriptions record Siyaka's village grants to two Nagar Brahmins, after a victorious campaign against one Yogaraja. The identity of Yogaraja is uncertain: he may have been a Chavda chief or the Chalukya chief Avantivarman Yogaraja II. Both these rulers were vassals of the Pratiharas, and Siyaka may have led an expedition against either of them as a Rashtrakuta subordinate. Siyaka issued the grants at the request of the ruler of Khetaka-mandala (Kheda), who might have been a Rashtrakuta feudatory as well.

=== Hunas ===
Nava-sahasanka-charita, an epic poem by the Paramara court poet Padmagupta, states that Siyaka defeated Huna princes, and turned their harems into a residence of widows. The fragmentary Modi inscription also corroborates this victory of Siyaka, stating that he ruled the land "sprinkled over by the blood of the Hunas". This Huna territory was probably located in the north-western part of Malwa. Siyaka might have defeated a successor of the Huna chief Jajjapa, who had been killed by the Chalukya feudatory Balavarman in 9th century.

=== Chandelas ===
Nava-Sahasanka-Charita also mentions that Siyaka defeated the lord of Rudapati. This territory appears to be same as "Rodapadi" mentioned in a fragmentary inscription found at Vidisha; it appears that Rudapati lay on the eastern frontier of the Paramara kingdom. The conquest of Rudapati would have brought Siyaka in conflict with the Chandela king Yashovarman. A 956 CE Chandela inscription in Khajuraho states that Yashovarman was the God of death for the Malavas (that is Paramaras, the rulers of Malwa region). Yashovarman extended the Chandela kingdom up to Bhasvat (Vidisha) and Malava river (possibly Betwa) in the west. Based on these facts, it appears that Siyaka had to face a defeat against the Chandelas.

=== Sack of Manyakheta ===
In 963 CE, the Rashtrakuta king Krishna III led a second expedition of northern India. The 965 CE and 968 CE inscriptions of his Western Ganga feudatory Marasimha state that their forces destroyed Ujjayani, a major city of the Malwa region. Based on this, historians such as A. S. Altekar theorize that Siyaka had rebelled against the Rashtrakutas, resulting in a military campaign against him. However, K. N. Seth believes that Ujjain was under Gurjara-Pratihara rule at this time, and Krishna III's campaign was directed against them: there is no evidence to show that Siyaka rebelled against Krishna III or faced a battle against his forces.

After the death of Krishna III in c. 967 CE, the Rashtrakuta power started declining. His successor Khottiga, probably wary of the growing Paramara power, fought a battle against Siyaka. The battle was fought at Khalighatta on the banks of the Narmada River. Khottiga appears to have been the aggressor in this battle, as it was fought closer to the traditional Paramara territory. Siyaka was victorious, although he lost his Vagada feudatory Kanka (or Chachha) in the battle.

After the battle, Siyaka pursued Khottiga's retreating forces to the Rashtrakuta capital Manyakheta, and sacked that city. The Udaipur prashasti states that Siyaka was as fierce as garuda when he took the wealth of Khottiga in battle. This event happened in 972-973 CE, as suggested by the poet Dhanapala, who states that he wrote Paiyalacchi-namamala when the lord of Malava was looting Manyakheta. Siyaka's victory led to the decline of the Rashtrakutas, and the establishment of the Paramaras as a sovereign power in Malwa.

== Last years ==
At its zenith, Siyaka's kingdom extended from Banswara in north to the Narmada River in south, and from Khetaka-mandala (present-day Kheda / Mahi River) in the west to Vidisha area (Betwa River) in the east.

According to the Paramara court poet Padmagupta, Siyaka was a Rajarshi ("king-sage"): he retired as an ascetic, after which he wore clothes made of grass. Tilaka-Manjari, a work composed by Dhanapala (the court poet of Siyaka's son Munja), suggests that Siyaka was a devotee of the goddess Lakshmi (Sri).

Siyaka and his queen Vadaja had two sons: Munja-raja (alias Vakpati) and Sindhu-raja. Siyaka sacked Manyakheta in c. 972 CE, and his successor Munja's earliest inscription is dated 974 CE, so Siyaka must have retired or died somewhere between 972 and 974 CE.

== Inscriptions ==
Find spots of the inscriptions from Siyaka's reign

Following inscriptions of Siyaka have been discovered. All of these record grants, and are written in Sanskrit language and Nagari script.

=== 949 Harsola copper plates ===
This inscription, issued on 31 January 949 CE, was discovered in the possession of a Visnagar Brahmin of Harsol in the 20th century. It suggests that Siyaka was a Rashtrakuta feudatory in his early years. It records the grants of two villages to a Nagar Brahmin father-son duo of Anandpura (identified with Vadnagar). The villages - Kumbharotaka and Sihaka - are identified with the modern villages of Kamrod and Sika.The dapaka or the officer-in-charge of registering the grants was a Thakkura named Vishnu.

=== 969 Ahmedabad copper plate ===
This fragmentary inscription, issued on 14 October 969 CE, was in the possession of a resident of Kheda in the early 20th century. He presented it to Muni Jinavijaya of Ahmedabad's Gujarat Puratatva Mandir in 1920.

The inscription originally comprised two copper plates, of which only the second one is now available. The inscription records a grant, but the exact nature of this grant cannot be determined from the 10-line second plate. The plate depicts a Garuda (the Paramara royal emblem) in human form, about to strike a snake held in its left arm. Below the Garuda is the sign manual of the king. The name of the dapaka (the officer-in-charge of registering the grants) is mentioned as Kaṇhapaika. The same name appears in the 974 CE Dharmapuri grant of Siyaka's son Munja.
