= Chhittaraja =

12th Shilahara Ruler
- Reign: c. 1022 – c. 1035 CE
- Predecessor: Arikesarin
- Successor: Nagarjuna
- Dynasty: Shilahara

Chhittaraja was a Shilahara ruler of the north Konkan branch of Silahara dynasty and he ruled from 1022 CE to 1035 CE.

Chhittaraja succeeded his uncle Arikesarin some time before 1026 CE, when he issued his Bhandup plates. Chhittaraja was a patron of art and literature. He built the magnificent temple of Shiva at Ambarnath near Kalyan. He patronised Soddhala, the author of the Udayasundarikatha.

== See also ==
- Shilahara
