= Haripaladeva =

Haripaladeva was the Shilahara ruler of the north Konkan branch from 1148 CE – 1155 CE.

Aparaditya was followed by Haripaladeva, several of whose inscriptions ranging in dates from Shaka 1070 to Shaka 1076 have been discovered in Thane district. (Dept. Gazetteer: 2002)

== See also ==
- Shilahara
