= Gonka =

Fifth Shilahara king
- Reign: c. 1175 – c. 1212 CE

Gonka was the 5th ruler of Kolhapur branch of the Silahara dynasty. During the reign of Gonka (1020 CE - 1050 CE), the Chalukyas conquered Kolhapur, under their king Jayasinha (before 1024 CE).

The Shilaharas had to submit to the Chalukyas in order to retain their kingdom. In the records, Gonka is described as conqueror of Kahada (Karad), Mairiage (Miraj) and Konkan. It is probable that Gonka might have extended his rule over these territories as an agent for or with the consent of his overlords.

== See also ==
- Shilahara
