= Vappuvanna =

4th Shilahara Ruler
- Reign: c. 880 – c. 910 CE
- Predecessor: Kapardin II
- Successor: Jhanjha
- Issue: Jhanjha
- House: Shilahara
- Father: Kapardin II

Vappuvanna was a Shilahara ruler of north Konkan branch, or modern-day western India, from 880 CE – 910 CE.

Kapardin II was followed by his son Vappuvanna, about whom his successors' records give only conventional praise.(Dept. Gazetteer: 2002)

== See also ==
- Shilahara
