= Aparaditya I =

Aparaditya I was Shilahara ruler of north Konkan branch from 1170 CE – 1197 CE.

Aparaditya I was a versatile man. He took keen interest in music and was also proficient in Dharmashastra. His commentary Apararka on the Yajnyavalkya-smriti is still regarded as the standard work on Dharmashastra in Kashmir. It seems to have been introduced there by the aforementioned ambassador Tejahkantha.(Dept. Gazetteer: 2002)

== See also ==
- Shilahara
