= Indian copper plate inscriptions =

Historical legal records of the Indian subcontinent

Indian copper plate inscriptions are legal records engraved on copper plates. The practice was widespread and long-running in the Indian subcontinent; it may date back to as early as the 3rd century BCE, however the vast majority of recovered plates were produced in the 1st millennium CE. The plates were legal documents which registered and recorded an act of endowment, i.e. a grant or donation, typically of land or concessions. The plate contained bureaucratic information on land tenure and taxation essential to the operation of the state.

The copper plates can survive intact indefinitely: copper, being a non-ferrous metal, does not rust or otherwise deteriorate when exposed to oxygen the way iron does, but rather develops a protective patina.

== Historical significance ==
As primary historical documents and archaeological artifacts, the copper plates are invaluable tools for scholarly research in the general history and society of the Indian subcontinent in the 1st millennium CE, and in particular to the early history of Christianity in Asia and the subcontinent. For instance, between the 8th and 10th centuries CE, authorities on the Malabar Coast granted special rights and concessions to the community known as Nasrani (Saint Thomas Christians) which were recorded on copper plates referred to as Cheppeds or Sasanam ("Royal Grants").

== Legal value ==
As legal documents, historians liken Indian copper plate engravings to a modern-day license or property deed, and suggest that the party claiming ownership of or rights to donated resources would be obligated to show their plates to the state authorities if challenged. As an additional indicator of the legitimacy of the endowment, it was not uncommon for donors to clasp the plates together with a ring bearing the donor's personal seal. As instruments of state expansion, the durability and easy retrievability of the copper plates was crucial to consolidating newly settled lands.

== History ==
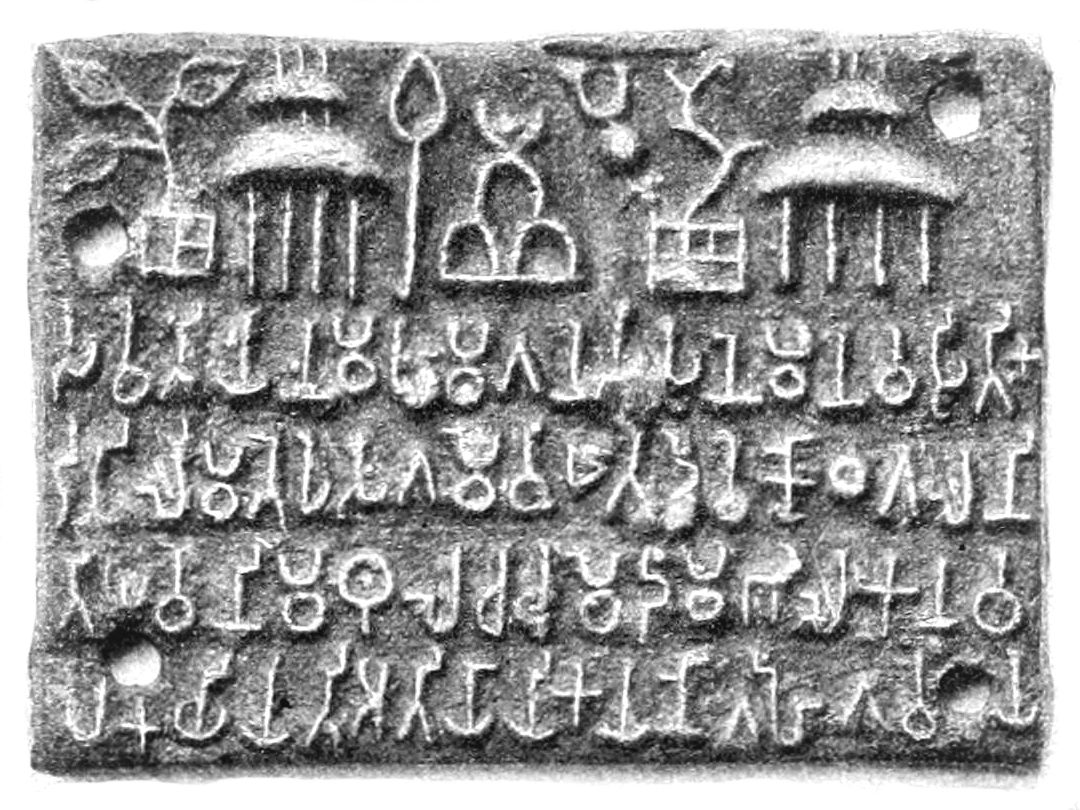
The Sohgaura copper plate inscription, the earliest known of its kind, 3rd century BCE

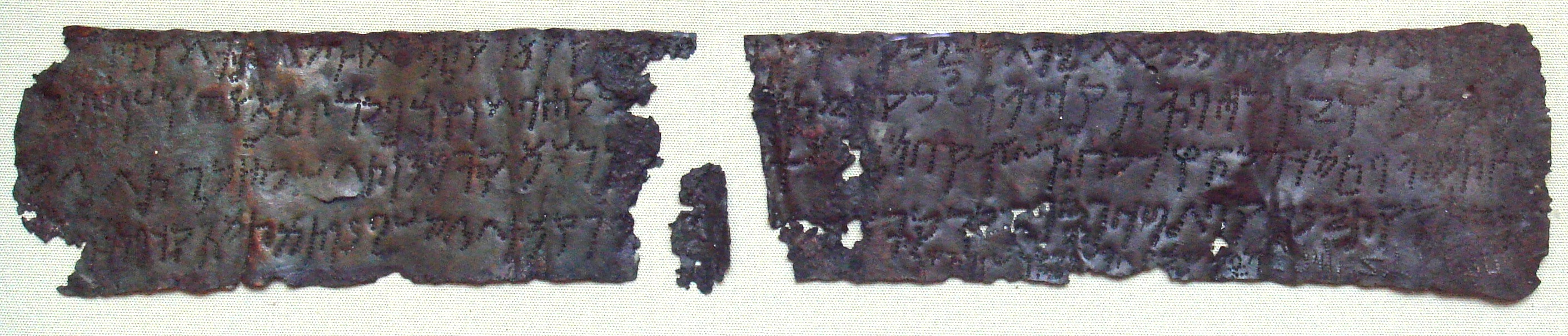
The Taxila copper plate, 1st century BCE (British Museum).

Indian copper plate inscriptions (tamarashasana), usually record grants of land or lists of royal lineages carrying the royal seal, a profusion of which have been found in South India. Originally, texts were recorded on palm leaves, but when the records were legal documents such as title-deeds they were etched on a cave or temple wall, or more commonly, on copper plates which were then secreted in a safe place such as within the walls or foundation of a temple, or hidden in stone caches in fields. Plates could be used more than once, as when a canceled grant was overstruck with a new inscription. These records were probably in use from the first millennium.

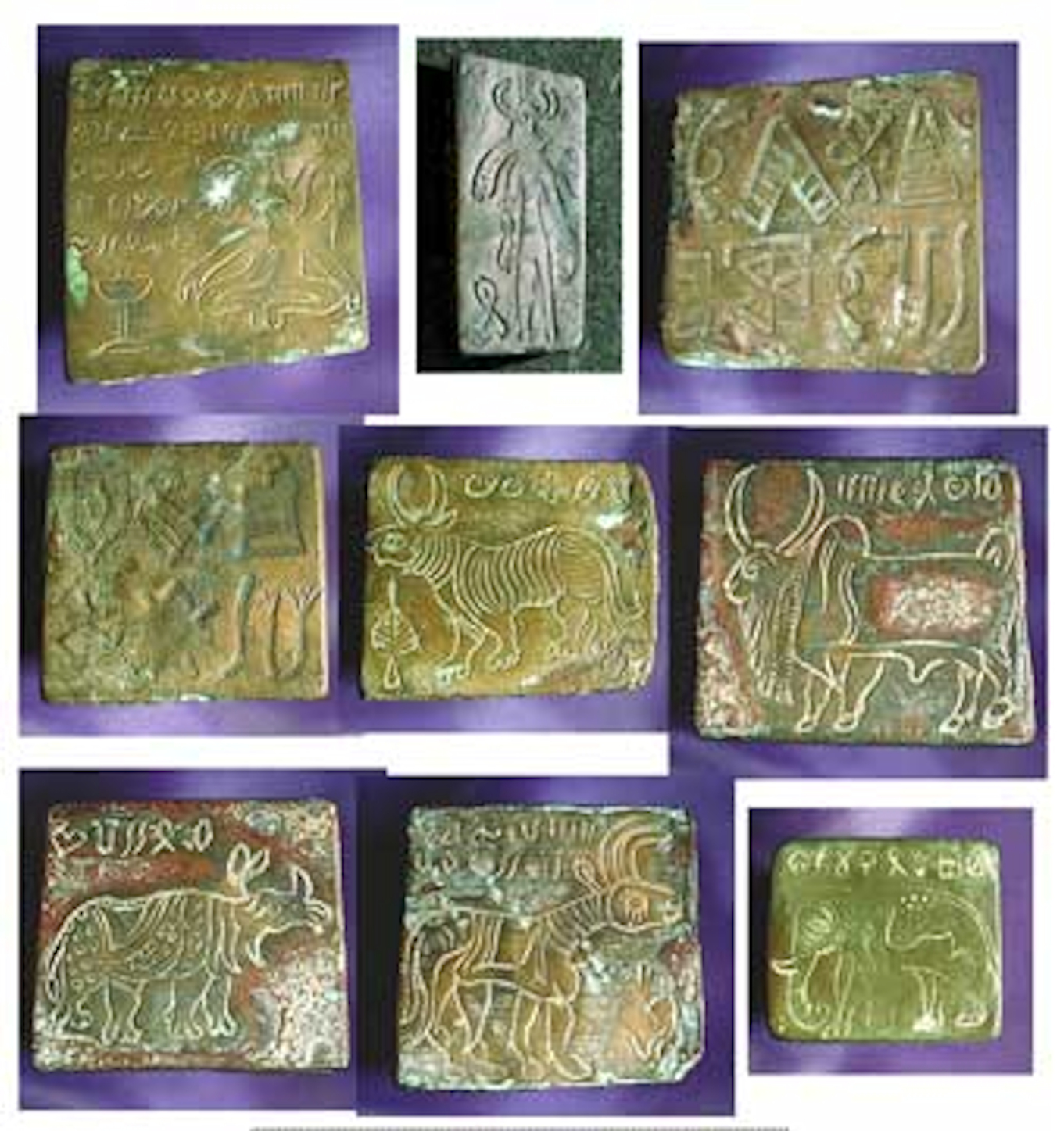
Copper plates. Mature Harappan period, 2600–1900 BC (Shinde, 2014)

A group of nine inscribed copper plates has been identified by Shinde in 2014 as the oldest such objects in the Indian subcontinent. They date to the Mature Harappan era, and contain inscriptions up to 34 characters long. Their place of origin unknown. They are thought to have been used for copper plate printing.

The Sohgaura copper-plate inscription, inscribed in the Brahmi script, may date to the 3rd century BCE Maurya Empire and is likely a precursor to the later copper-plate inscriptions. It is written on a small plaque of bronze (a copper alloy).

The Taxila and the Kalawan copper-plate inscriptions (c. 1st century CE or earlier) are among the earliest known instances of true copper plates being used for writing in the Indian subcontinent. These plates are not proper charters, unlike later copper-plate inscriptions.

The oldest known copper-plate charter from the Indian subcontinent is the Patagandigudem inscription of the 3rd century CE Andhra Ikshvaku king Ehuvala Chamtamula. The oldest known copper-plate charter from northern India is probably the Kalachala grant of Ishvararata, dated to the late fourth century on palaeographic basis.

Some of the earliest authenticated copper plates were issued by the Pallava dynasty kings in the 4th century, and are in Prakrit and Sanskrit. An example of early Sanskrit inscription in which Kannada words are used to describe land boundaries, are the Tumbula inscriptions of Western Ganga Dynasty, which have been dated to 444 according to a 2004 Indian newspaper report. Rare copper plates from the Gupta period have been found in North India. The use of copper plate inscriptions increased and for several centuries they remained the primary source of legal records.

Most copper plate inscriptions record title-deeds of land-grants made to Charanas and Brahmanas, individually or collectively. The inscriptions followed a standard formula of identifying the royal donor and his lineage, followed by lengthy honorifics of his history, heroic deeds, and his extraordinary personal traits. After this would follow the details of the grant, including the occasion, the recipient, and the penalties involved if the provisions were disregarded or violated. Although the profusion of complimentary language can be misleading, the discovery of copper plate inscriptions have provided a wealth of material for historians.

Tirumala Venkateswara Temple have a unique collection of about 3000 copper plates on which the Telugu Sankirtans of Tallapaka Annamacharya and his descendants are inscribed.

== Tamil copper-plate inscriptions ==
Tamil copper-plate inscriptions are engraved copper-plate records of grants of villages, plots of cultivable lands or other privileges to private individuals or public institutions by the members of the various South Indian royal dynasties. The study of these inscriptions has been especially important in reconstructing the history of Tamil Nadu. The grants range in date from the 10th century C.E. to the mid 19th century C.E. A large number of them belong to the Chalukyas, the Cholas and the Vijayanagar kings. These plates are valuable epigraphically as they give us an insight into the social conditions of medieval South India; they also help us fill chronological gaps in the connected history of the ruling dynasties. For example, the Leyden grant (so called as they are preserved in the Museum of Leyden in Holland) of Parantaka Chola and those of Parakesari Uttama Chola are among the most important, although the most useful part, i.e., the genealogical section, of the latter's plates seems to have been lost.

Vijaynagar Tamil Copper Plate Inscriptions at the Dharmeshwara Temple, Kondarahalli, Hoskote

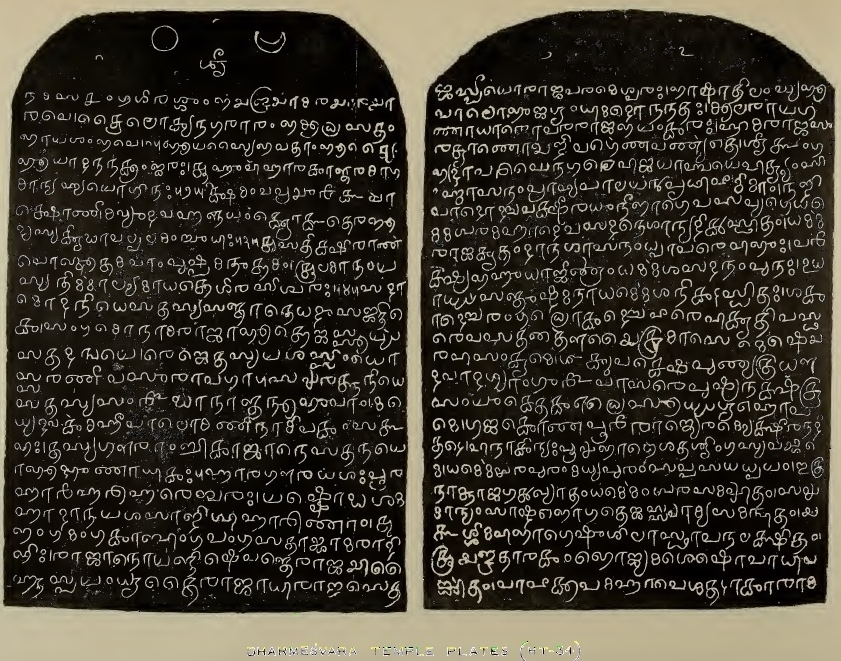
Plate 1 and Back

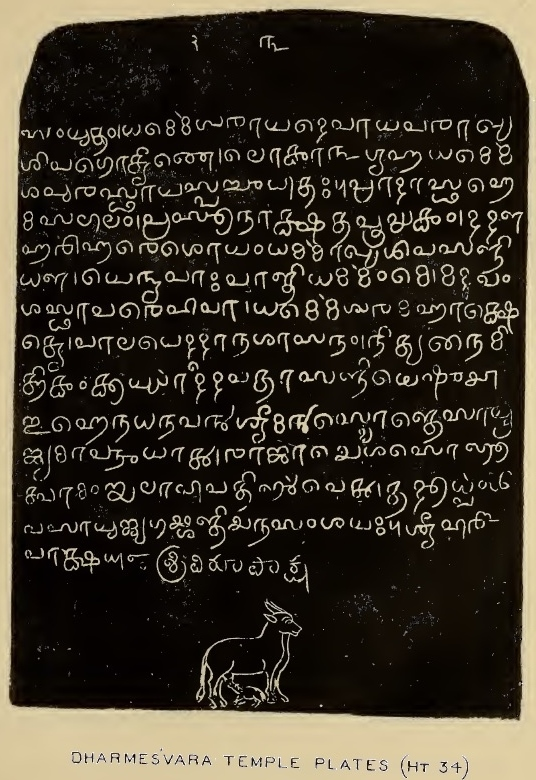
Plate 2

Unlike the neighbouring states where early inscriptions were written in Sanskrit and Prakrit, the early inscriptions in Tamil Nadu used Tamil along with some Prakrit. Tamil has the extant literature amongst the Dravidian languages, but dating the language and the literature precisely is difficult. Literary works in India were preserved either in palm leaf manuscripts (implying repeated copying and recopying) or through oral transmission, making direct dating impossible. External chronological records and internal linguistic evidence, however, indicate that extant works were probably compiled sometime between the 4th century BCE and the 3rd century CE. Epigraphic attestation of Tamil begins with rock inscriptions from the 3rd century BCE, written in Tamil-Brahmi, an adapted form of the Brahmi script. The earliest extant literary text is the Tolkāppiyam, a work on poetics and grammar which describes the language of the classical period, dated variously between the 5th century BCE and the 2nd century CE.

== Copper plates of Kerala ==
Between the eighth and tenth centuries, rulers on the Malabar Coast awarded various rights and privileges to Nazranies (Saint Thomas Christians) on copper plates, known as Cheppeds, or Royal Grants or Sasanam.

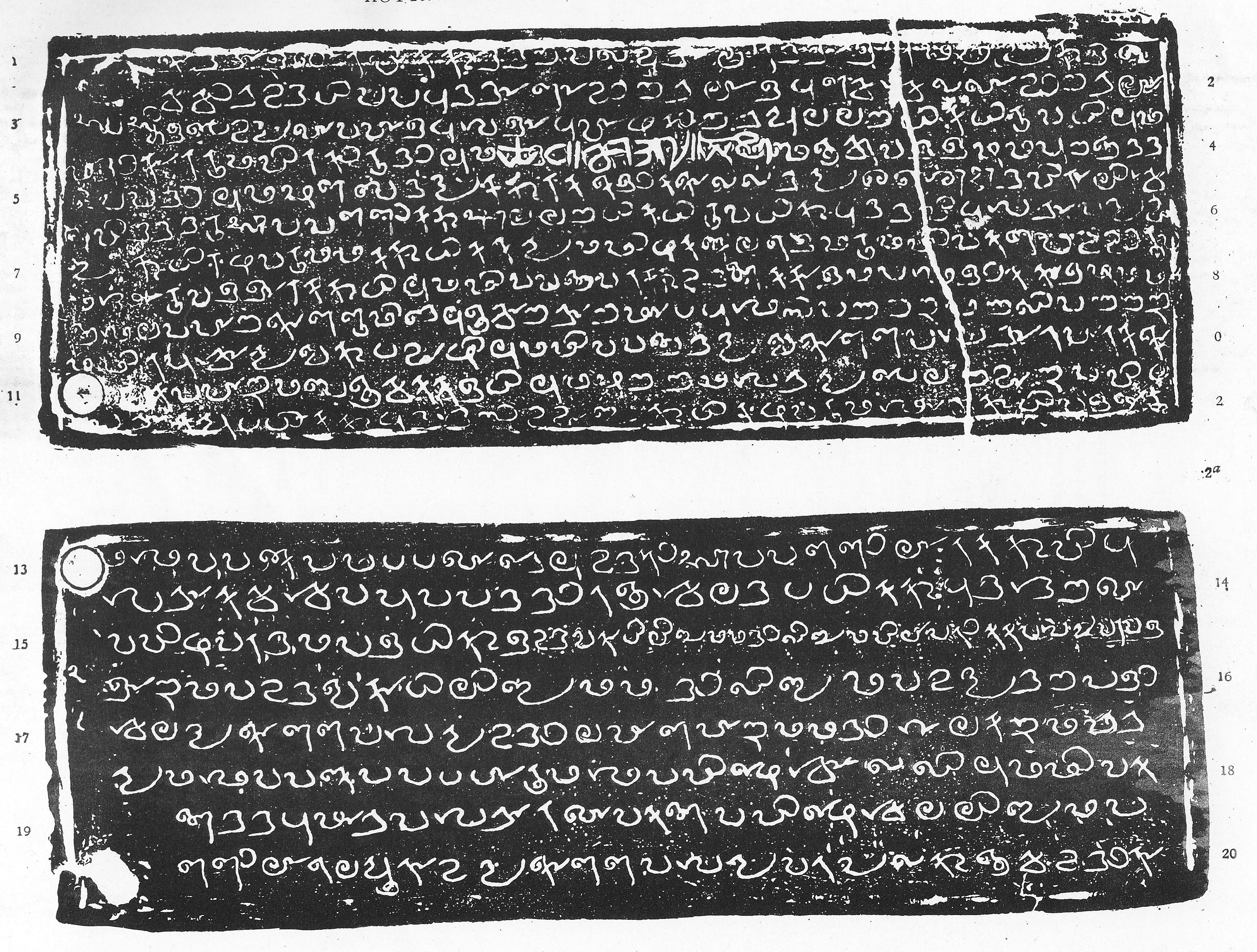
Tharisapalli plates of 849 CE

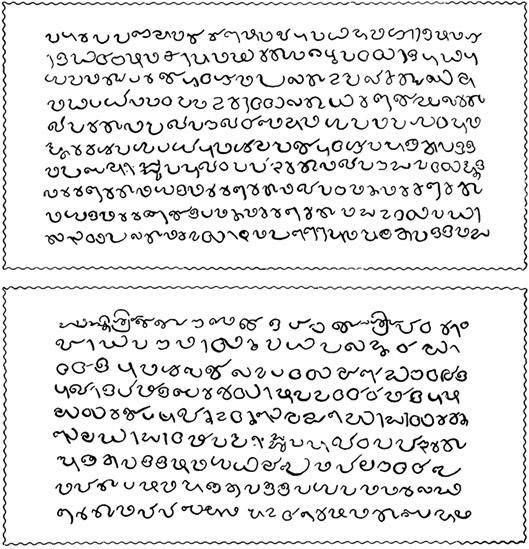
The inscription from the Sasanam
- Iravikorthan Sassanam, awarded by Shri Veera Raghava Perumal (in c. 774 CE)
- Thomas of Cana copper plates, a lost set of copper plates awarded to Knai Thoma and his followers (Knanaya) sometime between the 4th and 9th century.
- Tharissapalli Chepped, awarded in 849 CE by the King of Venadu (Quilon), Ayyan Atikal Tiruvatikal, to Sapir Isho, the leader of Syrian Christians in Malabar Coast in the 5th regnal year of the Chera ruler Sthanu Ravi Varma. It is the first important inscription of Kerala, the date of which has been determined with accuracy. It is engraved on copper plates in vatteluttu and signed by 25 witnesses. Names of fifteen of them are in Kufic, ten in Pahlavi, and four in Hebrew.
- Jewish Copper Plate, awarded by Bhaskara Ravi Varman I Perumal (962-1019 A.D.), is a Sasanam outlining the grant of rights of the Anjuvannam and 72 other properietary rights to local Jewish Chief Ousepp Irabban

== Grants ==
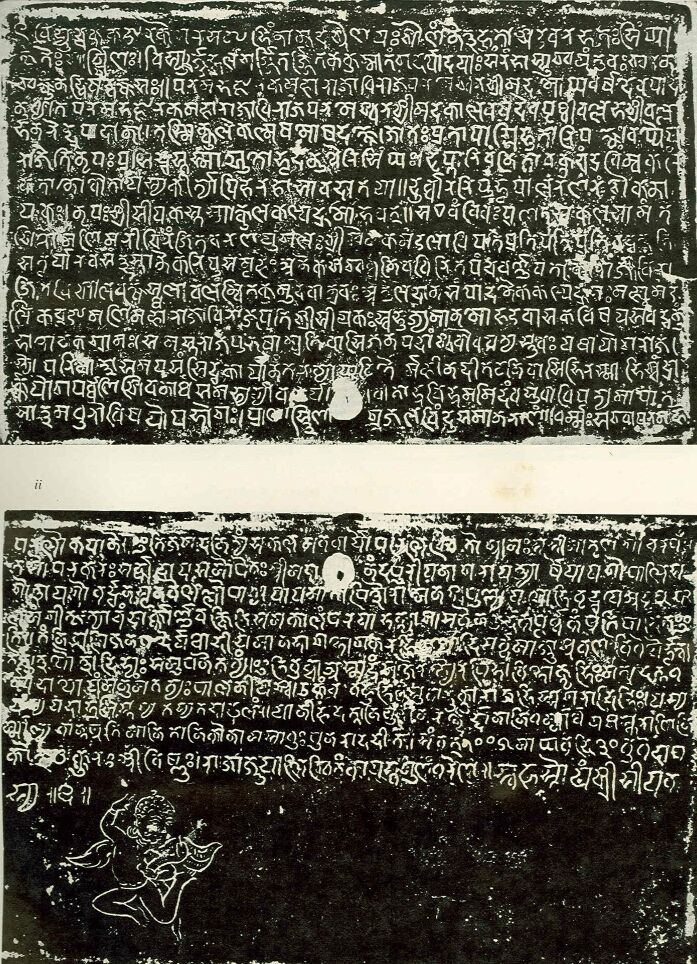
Paramara ruler Siyaka's Harsola copperplate copper plate of 949 CE

One of the most important sources of history in the Indian subcontinent are the royal records of grants engraved on copper-plates (tamra-shasan or tamra-patra; tamra means copper in Sanskrit and several other Indian languages). Because copper does not rust or decay, they can survive virtually indefinitely.

Collections of archaeological texts from the copper-plates and rock-inscriptions have been compiled and published by the Archaeological Survey of India during the past century.

The copper plate is approximately 9 3/4 inches long × 3 1/4 inches high × 1/10 (to 1/16) inches thick.

The Sohgaura copper-plate is a Maurya (322–185 BCE) record which refers to a famine. It is one of the very few pre-Ashoka Brahmi inscriptions in India.

== See also ==
- Early Indian epigraphy
- Laguna Copperplate Inscription
- Jewish copper plates of Cochin
- King Rajendra I Chola Charter
- Quilon Syrian copper plates
- Thiruvalla copper plates
- History of metallurgy in the Indian subcontinent
- South Indian Inscriptions
- Stambha
- Lōmāfānu
