= Barbaras =

Group of mythological characters

Barbaras were barbarians who were mentioned in the Indian epic Mahabharata, along with the Yavanas, Sakas and Kambojas.
