= V. S. Pathak =

Vishwambhar Sharan Pathak (1926–2003) was an Indian historian, Sanskrit scholar and an Indologist who authored several books.

Pathak was born at Narmadapuram in 1926. He completed his first PhD from Banaras Hindu University (BHU) in the mid fifties. In 1957–58 he served as co-editor (with Prof RB Pandey) of the bulletin Bharati of the Department of Ancient Indian History Culture and Archaeology of BHU.

In the late fifties he moved to Sagar University in Madhya Pradesh as a member of faculty at the Department of Ancient Indian History, Culture and Archaeology. Pathak completed his second PhD in the early sixties under the Indologist A. L. Basham at SOAS at London University.

V.S. Pathak served as Head of the Department of History, Archaeology and Culture and also as Vice Chancellor of Gorakhpur University. He was invited to deliver the Professor Jagannath Agrawal memorial lecture (started in 1994) at the Punjab University, Chandigarh.

Pathak died on 19 December 2003. During his last days, he was annotating Bhoja's Tattva-Prakasha and two commentaries on it.

== Selected works ==
- Pathak, V.S. (1960), History of Saiva Cults in Northern India from Inscriptions (700 AD to 1200 AD), Published by Ram Naresh Varma, Printed at The Tara Printing Works, Varanasi, Uttar Pradesh, India.
- Pathak, V.S. (1966), Ancient Historians of India; a study in historical biographies, Asia Publishing House, Bombay, India.
- Pathak, V.S. (1987), Smarta religious tradition: Being a study of the epigraphic data on Smarta religious tradition of northern India c.600 AD to c.1200 AD, Kusumanjali Prakashan, Meerut, Uttar Pradesh, India.
- Pathak, V.S. (1992), Desh ke Abhidhan (in Hindi), Lucknow, Uttar Pradesh, India.

== Reviewed work ==
- V.S.Pathak (1968), Review: Ancient Historians of India. A Study in Historical Biographies, Journal of the American Oriental Society, Vol 88, No 2, page 374.
