= Shilahara dynasty =

8th-13th century Indian dynasty

Shilahara Kannada Dynasty
- 800–1212
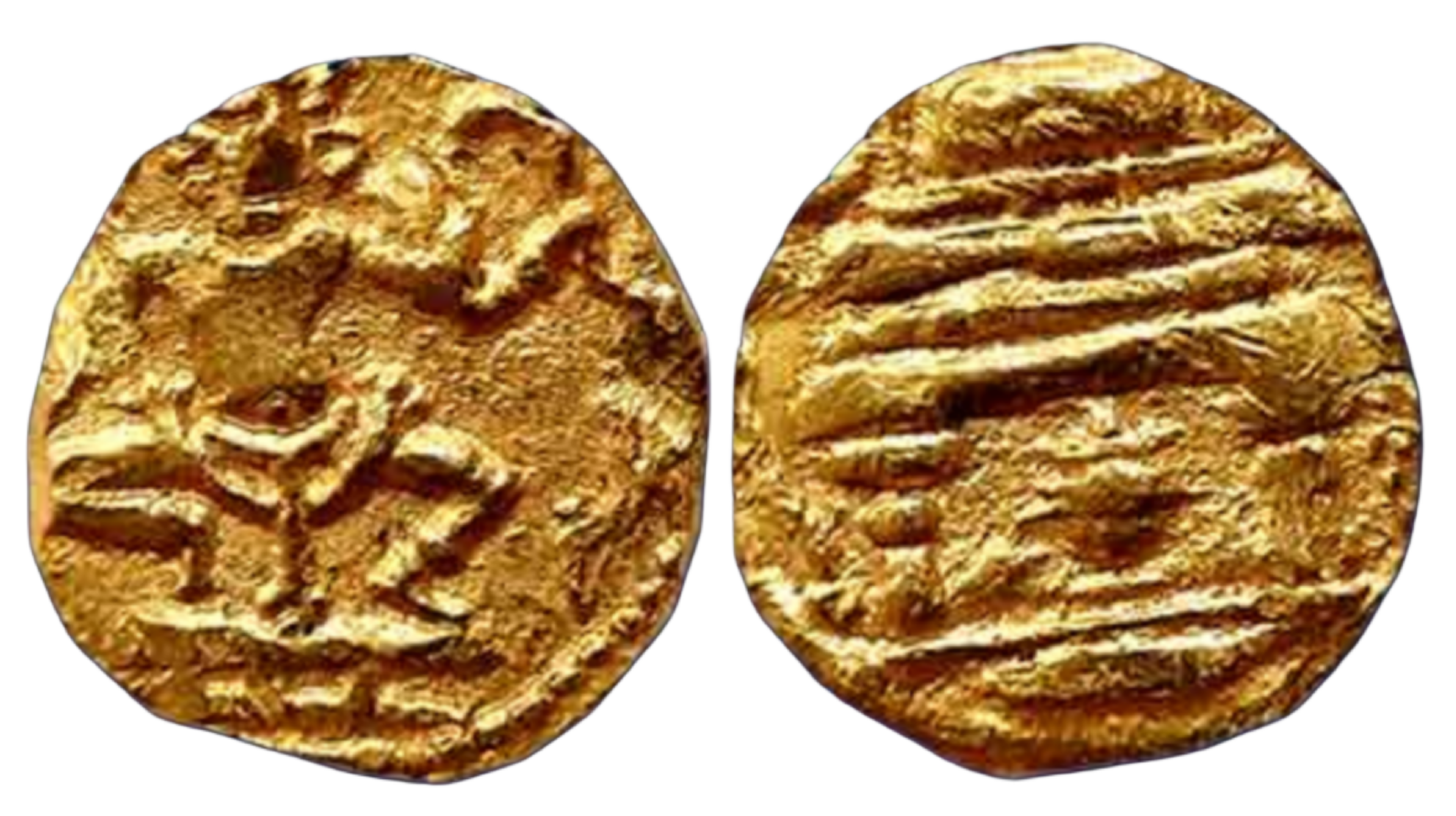
- Anonymous Gold Coins (perhaps from Kolhapur Shilaharas) dating from the 10th–11th centuries.

- Main South Asian polities in 1000, on the eve of the Ghaznavid invasions of the subcontinent.
- Capital: Kolhapur; Thane
- Common languages: Kannada; Sanskrit; Marathi
- Religion: Jainism
- Government: Monarchy
- History
  - Established: 800
  - Disestablished: 1212
Preceded by	Succeeded by
Rashtrakuta dynasty	Seuna (Yadava) dynasty
- Today part of: India

The flag of the Shilahara Maratha Dynasty features a golden Garuda clutching a serpent against a saffron background with black detailing, inspired by the dynasty’s traditional golden Garuda emblem and its royal heritage.

Billon Drachm coins of the Shilahara dynasty, c. 1210–1302. Obv: Head of a king. Rev: A horseman fighting two foot-soldiers with a third behind him and a fourth dead at his horse's feet.

The Shilahara dynasty (IAST: Śilāhāra) was a royal house that ruled parts of western India between the 8th and 13th centuries CE. Originally vassals of the powerful Rashtrakuta Empire, the Shilaharas rose to prominence and established three semi-independent branches that governed over North Konkan, South Konkan, and the Kolhapur region of present-day Maharashtra. Their rule was marked by regional consolidation, temple patronage, and the promotion of religious pluralism—especially Jainism.

The dynasty is believed to have been of maratha origin, with deep cultural and administrative ties to the Deccan. Their early records, composed in Sanskrit and Kannada, point to close associations with Jain Acharyas and they were instrumental in the spread of Jainism in western Maharashtra.

Shilahara rulers were known for building and endowing Jain temples (basadis) and Hindu shrines, issuing copperplate grants, and commissioning inscriptions in Kannada, Sanskrit, and early Marathi. Their courts supported Kannada, Sanskrit, and Marathi literature, and they maintained a legacy of decentralized yet stable governance.

== History ==
=== Origins and branches ===
The dynasty was founded under the suzerainty of the Rashtrakuta king Govinda III. Kapardin I was placed in charge of Northern Konkan, while Sanaphulla established the Southern Konkan branch. The powerful Kolhapur branch emerged later under Jatiga II, eventually ruling independent of direct Rashtrakuta genealogy.

The dynasty's origin myth traced their family's ancestry to a vidyadhara prince named Jimutavahana and a warrior named Silara who defended Konkan against Parashurama's arrows.

=== Territory ===
The Shilahara dynasty ruled different parts of western India between the 8th and 13th centuries. The kingdom was divided into three major branches:

• North Konkan Branch: Centered around modern-day Mumbai and Thane districts, with key ports and trade centers.

• South Konkan Branch: Controlled areas along the southern coastal belt, including present-day Ratnagiri and Sindhudurg.

• Kolhapur Branch: The most powerful and enduring branch, it governed much of present-day southern Maharashtra and northern Karnataka.

Each branch functioned semi-independently under the nominal suzerainty of larger empires like the Rashtrakutas and later the Chalukyas. Kolhapur brant eventually became the most dominant, with rulers like Jatiga II asserting near-complete independence.

== Religion ==
The Shilaharas were Kannada speaking Jains, though early rulers of the Kolhapur and Southern Konkan branches were especially devoted to Jainism. Several rulers and queens funded Jain Basadi's, honored Digambara monks, and issued land grants to Jain basadis. King Gonka built a Jain Basadi at Kolhapur after being cured of snakebite by a Jain monk. Under Bhoja I, the Jain Acharya Maghanandi established a Jain religious center at Rupanarayana Basadi, and royal patronage included kings and queens becoming his disciples.

kings like Gandaraditya I and Bhoja II, also supported Hinduism But Jain influences remained strong in court circles and temple building. Many Jain temples from this era, such as in Kolhapur and Kharepatan, exhibit Chalukyan architectural features fused with Jain iconography.

Several Jain basadis (temples) were constructed during the Shilahara period, especially in regions such as Kolhapur, Miraj, and North Karnataka.

== Architecture and legacy ==
Parshwanath Jain twin temples of Kolhapur Shilaharas at Ibrahimpur and Bhogoli in Chandgad.

King Chhittaraja (North Konkan branch, ruled 1022–1035 CE) commissioned the famous Shiv Mandir Ambarnath near Kalyan.

The Mahalakshmi Temple, Kolhapur received royal patronage under the Shilahara dynasty, as well as earlier regional rulers including the Chalukyas and Rashtrakutas, though it functioned as a Jain shrine during that period. Scholar Paul Dundas notes that the site was originally dedicated to Chandraprabha (the eighth Tirthankara) and his yakshi through the Shilahara era, before transitioning into a Vedic Hindu temple complex during the Peshwa period.

The Walkeshwar Temple and the Banganga Tank were built during the reign of Chittaraja, a king of this dynasty. and Kopineshwar Mandir, a Shiva temple in Thane.

22nd Jain tirthnakar Neminath temple at Khidrapur of king Gandaraditya era of Kolhapur shilaharas, Rishabhnath Jain temple at Pattankodoli in Hatkanangale taluka of Kolhapur Shilaharas has Kannada inscription stating the reign of king Gandaraditya. Temple dedicated to The First tirthankar Of Jainism (11th century A.D), Parshwanath Jain temple of Kolhapur Shilaharas at Ainapur in Gadhinglaj taluka, Chandraprabhu 8th Jain tirthankar temple at Herle, near Kolhapur with Kannada inscriptions of Shilaharas. Parshwanath Jain temple of Kolhapur Shilaharas at Baamni and Sangaon in Kagal taluka. Idol of Parshwanath Jain tirthankar found in excavation of Hupari in Hatkanangale Taluka has Kannada inscriptions Kolhapur Shilaharas.

The Shilahara rulers were known for constructing both Jain and Hindu temples across parts of present-day Karnataka and Maharashtra.

== Three main branches ==
• North Konkan(c. 800–1265 CE), with its capital at Thane

• South Konkan (c. 765–1029 CE), centered in Kharepatan–Goa region

• Kolhapur branch (c. 940–1212 CE), covering present-day southern Maharashtra and northern Karnataka

These branches ruled semi-independently but shared a common heritage of Rashtrakuta allegiance, Kannada influence, and Jain patronage.

=== North Konkan (Thane) branch (c. 800–1265 CE) ===
Find spots of inscriptions issued during the reign of the Shilaharas of North Konkan

After Rashtrakuta power became weak, the last known ruler of this family, Rattaraja, declared his independence. But Chalukya Jayasimha, the younger brother of Vikramaditya, overthrew him and appropriated his possessions. The second northern Shilahara king, Pullashakti, acknowledged the overlordship of the Rashtrakuta ruler Amoghavarsha (r. 815–877) and was the governor of Mangalpuri under him. The northern Shilaharas continued to be vassals under the Rashtrakutas until the ninth king Aparajit assumed independent rule in 997.

==== Rulers ====
1. Kapardin I (800–825 CE)
2. Pullashakti (825–850 CE)
3. Kapardin II (850–880 CE)
4. Vappuvanna (880–910 CE)
5. Jhanjha (910–930 CE)
6. Goggiraja (930–945 CE)
7. Vajjada I (945–965 CE)
8. Chhadvaideva (965–975 CE)
9. Aparajita (975–1010 CE)
10. Vajjada II (1010–1015 CE)
11. Arikesarin (1015–1022 CE)
12. Chhittaraja (1022–1035 CE)
13. Nagarjuna (1035–1045 CE)
14. Mummuniraja (1045–1070 CE)
15. Ananta Deva I (1070–1127 CE)
16. Aparaditya I (1127–1148 CE)
17. Haripaladeva (1148–1155 CE)
18. Mallikarjuna (1155–1170 CE)
19. Aparaditya II ( 1170–1197 CE)
20. Ananta Deva II (1198–1200 CE)
21. Keshideva II (1200–1245 CE)
22. Ananta Deva III (1245–1255 CE)
23. Someshvara (1255–1265 CE)

=== South Konkan branch (c. 765–1020 CE) ===
Find spots of inscriptions issued during the reign of the Shilaharas of South Konkan

This house's history is known through one record, the Kharepatan plates of Rattaraja issued in 1008. Rattaraja was the last ruler of this dynasty. The document is extremely important as it not only gives the genealogy of the ten ancestors of Rattaraja but also mentions their exploits. The founder, Sanaphulla, was vassal of the Rastrakuta emperor Krisna I who had established his power over Konkan by 765 and probably handed it to Sanaphulla. The Kharepatan plates declare that Sanaphulla obtained lordship over the territory between Sahya mountain and the sea through the favour of Krisnaraja.

Sana-phulla's son Dhammayira is known to have built a fort at Vallipattana on the Western Coast. Aiyaparaja secured victory at Chandrapuri (Chandor) in Goa. The reign of Avasara I proved to be uneventful. His son Adityavarman, who is described as brilliant as the Sun in valour, offered help to the kings of Chandrapuri and Chemulya (modern Chaul), 30 miles to the south of Bombay, so the influence of the Shilaharas had spread over the whole of Konkan. At this time Laghu Kapardi, the ruler of the Thane branch, was just a boy and the help given to the ruler of Chaul must have been at his expense. Avasara II continued the policy of his father. Indraraja's son Bhima is styled as 'Rahuvadgrasta Chandramandala' because he overthrew the petty ruler of Chandor. At this time the Kadamba ruler Sasthadeva and his son Chaturbhuja were trying to overthrow the Rastrakuta rule. This explains Bhima's opposition to Chandrapuri or Chandor. Avasara III, no doubt, ruled in troubled times, but had no contribution of his to make. Finally, Rattaraja, loyal to the Rastrakutas, was compelled to transfer his allegiance to Taila II.

Soon after the issue of the plates in 1008, the rule of Konkan passed over to the later Chalukyas. (Dept. Gazetteer: Kolaba, 1964, Dept. Gazetteer: 2002)

==== Rulers ====
1. Sanaphulla (765–795 CE)
2. Dhammayira (795–820 CE)
3. Aiyaparaja (820–845 CE)
4. Avasara I (845–870 CE)
5. Adityavarma (870–895 CE)
6. Avasara II (895–920 CE)
7. Indraraja (920–945 CE)
8. Bhima (945–970 CE)
9. Avasara III (970–995 CE)
10. Rattaraja (995–1020 CE)

=== Kolhapur branch (c. 940–1212 CE) ===
Find spots of inscriptions issued during the reign of the Shilaharas of Kolhapur

The Shilahara family at Kolhapur was the latest of the three and was founded about the time of the downfall of the Rashtrakuta Empire. They ruled over southern Maharashtra and Northern Karnataka, the modern districts of Satara, Kolhapur and Belagavi. Their family deity was the goddess Mahalakshmi, whose blessing they claimed to have secured in their copperplate grants (Mahalakshmi-labdha-vara-prasada). Like their relatives of the northern branch of Konkan, the Shilaharas of Kolhapur claimed to be of the lineage of the Vidyadhara Jimutavahana. They carried the banner of golden Garuda. One of the many titles used by the Shilaharas was Tagarapuravaradhisvara, or supreme sovereign ruler of Tagara.

The first capital of the Shilaharas was probably at Karad during the reign of Jatiga-II as known from their copper plate grant of Miraj and 'Vikramankadevacharita' of Bilhana. Hence sometimes they are referred as 'Shilaharas of Karad'. Later on although the capital was shifted to Kolhapur, some of their grants mention Valavada, and the hill fort of Pranalaka or Padmanala (Panhala) as the places of royal residence. Even though the capital was shifted to Kolhapur, Karhad retained its significance during the Shilahara period. This branch rose to power during the latter part of the Rashtrakuta rule and so, unlike the kings of the other two branches, those of this branch do not mention the genealogy of the Rashtrakutas even in their early grants. Later on they acknowledged the suzerainty of the later Chalukya for some time. This branch continued to hold the Southern Maharashtra from circa 940 to 1220.

It seems that Bhoja II, the last ruler of this family, was overthrown and dispossessed by Singhana in or soon after 1219-20 (Saka 1131) as is borne out by one of Singhana's inscriptions dated Saka 1160.

==== Rulers ====
1. Jatiga I (940–960 CE)
2. Naivarman (960–980 CE)
3. Chandra (980–1000 CE)
4. Jatiga II (1000–1020 CE)
5. Gonka (1020–1050 CE)
6. Guhala I (1050 CE)
7. Kirtiraja (1050 CE)
8. Chandraditya (1050 CE)
9. Marsimha (1050–1075 CE)
10. Guhala II (1075–1085 CE)
11. Bhoja I (1085–1100 CE)
12. Ballala (1100–1108 CE)
13. Gonka II (1108 CE)
14. Gandaraditya I (1108–1138 CE)
15. Vijayaditya I (1138–1175 CE)
16. Bhoja II (1175–1212 CE), last ruler of dynasty

== Decline and aftermath ==
The decline of the Shilahara dynasty began in the late 12th century as larger powers in the Deccan, such as the Yadavas of Devagiri started expanding their influence. The northern branch of the Shilaharas in Konkan was subdued by the Yadava ruler Singhana II around the beginning of the 13th century. Similarly, in southern regions like Kolhapur, Shilahara rulers eventually lost control to the expanding Seuna (Yadava) power.

After their decline, many of the temples, inscriptions, and water tanks built during the Shilahara period continued to be used and maintained by successor dynasties. Some of their temples were modified or expanded by later rulers, but inscriptions bearing Shilahara grants remain important sources of regional history and temple patronage.

The legacy of the Shilaharas survives through their architectural contributions, particularly their support to religious institutions, which shaped the cultural landscape of parts of Maharashtra and Karnataka.

== See also ==
- Konkan
- History of India
- History of Maharashtra
- History of Karnataka
